= List of Ramularia species =

This is a list of species in the plant pathogen fungus genus Ramularia . Species Fungorum accepts nearly 900 species in the genus Ramularia.

== A ==
- Ramularia abscondita (Fautrey & Lambotte) U. Braun (1988)
- Ramularia absinthii Laubert (1920)
- Ramularia acervulata Golovin (1950)
- Ramularia achilleae-millefolii U. Braun & Rogerson (1993)
- Ramularia achyrophori-uniflori Baudyš & Picb. (1926)
- Ramularia aconiti (Petr.) Penz. (1927)
- Ramularia acris Lindr. (1902)
- Ramularia acroptili Bremer (1948)
- Ramularia actaeae Ellis & Holw. (1885)
- Ramularia actaeina U. Braun (1993)
- Ramularia actinidiae Ablak. (1960)
- Ramularia acutae P. Karst. (1884)
- Ramularia acutata (Bonord.) Lind (1913)
- Ramularia adenophorae Moesz (1938)
- Ramularia adesmiae (Henn.) Wollenw. (1916)
- Ramularia adoxae P. Karst. (1884)
- Ramularia aegopodii Savinceva (1972)
- Ramularia aequivoca (Ces.) Sacc. (1881)
- Ramularia agastaches Sawada (1958)
- Ramularia agerati Sawada (1959)
- Ramularia agoseridis Ellis & Everh. (1900)
- Ramularia agrestis Sacc. (1882)
- Ramularia agrimoniae Sacc. (1896)
- Ramularia agropyri Schulzer (1874)
- Ramularia aguirrei Speg. (1882)
- Ramularia ajugae (Niessl) Sacc. (1882)
- Ramularia alangii Hasija (1962)
- Ramularia alangiicola Videira, H.D. Shin & Crous (2016)
- Ramularia alaterni Thüm. (1881)
- Ramularia albomaculans Sawada (1958)
- Ramularia albomaculata Peck (1880)
- Ramularia alborosella (Desm.) Gjaerum (1968)
- Ramularia albowiana Siemaszko (1919)
- Ramularia alchemillae Voglino (1913)
- Ramularia alismatis Fautrey (1890)
- Ramularia alkannae Osipian (1975)
- Ramularia allii Byzova (1964)
- Ramularia alnicola Cooke (1885)
- Ramularia alpina (C. Massal.) Nannf. (1950)
- Ramularia alternantherae Z.Y. Zhang & Ying Xing Wang (2002)
- Ramularia amorphae Ying X. Wang & Z.Y. Zhang (1996)
- Ramularia anagallidis Lindr. (1902)
- Ramularia anaphalidicola U. Braun & Rogerson (1994)
- Ramularia anaphalidis (Golovin) U. Braun (1988)
- Ramularia anatolica Bremer & Petr. (1947)
- Ramularia anchusae C. Massal. (1894)
- Ramularia anchusae-officinalis A.G. Eliasson (1897)
- Ramularia andromedae Ellis & G. Martin (1884)
- Ramularia andropogonis Cooke ex Wollenw. (1916)
- Ramularia angelicae Höhn. (1903)
- Ramularia angustata Peck (1887)
- Ramularia angustissima Sacc. (1882)
- Ramularia anomala Peck (1913)
- Ramularia anserina Allesch. (1896)
- Ramularia antennariicola U. Braun (1994)
- Ramularia anthemidis Hollós (1907)
- Ramularia anthrisci Höhn. (1903)
- Ramularia aplospora Speg. (1880)
- Ramularia arabidicola Annal. (1981)
- Ramularia arachidis Bond.-Mont. (1934)
- Ramularia archangelicae Lindr. (1902)
- Ramularia aremoniae Bubák (1915)
- Ramularia arenariae A.L. Sm. & Ramsb. (1914)
- Ramularia argentinensis Deighton (1972)
- Ramularia ari Fautrey (1892)
- Ramularia arisaematis Ellis & Dearn. (1897)
- Ramularia aristolochiae U. Braun (1994)
- Ramularia armoraciae Fuckel (1870)
- Ramularia arnicalis Ellis & Everh. (1891)
- Ramularia arnicalis-montanae U. Braun (1994)
- Ramularia aromatica (Sacc.) Höhn. (1905)
- Ramularia aronici (Sacc.) Arx (1950)
- Ramularia artemisiae Davis (1926)
- Ramularia arvensis Sacc. (1882)
- Ramularia asparagi Z.Y. Zhang & W.Q. Chen (2003)
- Ramularia asperifolii Sacc. (1876)
- Ramularia asplenii Jaap (1915)
- Ramularia astaci H. Mann & Pieplow (1938)
- Ramularia astericola (Sacc.) Cif. (1962)
- Ramularia asteris (W. Phillips & Plowr.) Bubák (1908)
- Ramularia asteris-tripolii Jaap (1908)
- Ramularia atraphaxis (Golovin) U. Braun (1988)
- Ramularia atropae Allesch. (1892)
- Ramularia aucubae C. Massal. (1900)
- Ramularia australis Sacc. (1911)

== B ==
- Ramularia babajaniae (Osipian) U. Braun (1988)
- Ramularia baccharidis (Ellis & Everh.) U. Braun (1990)
- Ramularia baeumieriana Moesz (1926)
- Ramularia baeumleriana Moesz (1926)
- Ramularia balcanica Bubák & Ranoj. (1910)
- Ramularia ballotae C. Massal. (1890)
- Ramularia banksiana (Pass.) Sacc. (1886)
- Ramularia barbareae Peck (1887)
- Ramularia bartsiae Johanson (1884)
- Ramularia basarabica Săvul. & Sandu (1933)
- Ramularia batatas Racib. (1900)
- Ramularia bataticola Khokhr. & Dyur. (1934)
- Ramularia beccabungae Fautrey (1892)
- Ramularia beckeropsidis (Hansf.) Deighton (1973)
- Ramularia bellidis Sacc. (1882)
- Ramularia bellunensis Speg. (1879)
- Ramularia berberidis (Cooke) U. Braun (1988)
- Ramularia bergeniae Vasyag. (1973)
- Ramularia betae Rostr. (1899)
- Ramularia beticola Fautrey & Lambotte (1897)
- Ramularia betonicae Khokhr. (1951)
- Ramularia biflorae Magnus (1905)
- Ramularia biscutellae Vanev & Negrean (1993)
- Ramularia bistortae Fuckel (1870)
- Ramularia bonaerensis Speg. (1882)
- Ramularia borghettiana C. Massal. (1912)
- Ramularia bornmuelleriana (Magnus) U. Braun (1988)
- Ramularia bosniaca Bubák (1903)
- Ramularia botrychii Lindr. (1902)
- Ramularia branchialis Sordi (1958)
- Ramularia brassicae Vasyag. (1973)
- Ramularia bresadolae U. Braun (1991)
- Ramularia brevipes Ellis & Everh. (1900)
- Ramularia brunnea Peck (1878)
- Ramularia brunneopunctata U. Braun (1993)
- Ramularia bryoniae Fautrey & Roum. (1891)
- Ramularia bubakiana Picb. (1937)
- Ramularia bulgarica Bubák & Picb. (1937)
- Ramularia bullata (Ellis & Everh.) U. Braun (1992)
- Ramularia buniadis Vestergr. (1897)
- Ramularia buphthalmi Allesch. (1897)
- Ramularia butomi Lind (1905)
- Ramularia buxi Fuckel (1870)

== C ==
- Ramularia cacaliae Murashk. (1926)
- Ramularia caduca (W. Voss) U. Braun (1992)
- Ramularia calaminthae U. Braun, Chevassut & Pellic. (1998)
- Ramularia calcea (Desm.) Ces. (1852)
- Ramularia callistephi Vimba (1968)
- Ramularia calthae Gonz. Frag. (1916)
- Ramularia calthicola Gonz. Frag. (1927)
- Ramularia camelinae Osipian (1975)
- Ramularia campanulae-barbatae Jaap & Lindau (1907)
- Ramularia campanulae-latifoliae Allesch. (1895)
- Ramularia campanulae-persicifoliae A.G. Eliasson (1915)
- Ramularia campanulae-rotundifoliae Lindr. (1904)
- Ramularia campanulae-sarmaticae Lobik (1928)
- Ramularia campanulae-trachelii Sacc. ex Mussat (1901)
- Ramularia campanularum Karak. (1937)
- Ramularia caprifoliacearum U. Braun (1993)
- Ramularia cardamines Syd. & P. Syd. (1903)
- Ramularia cardui P. Karst. ex Sacc. (1892)
- Ramularia cardui-personatae Höhn. (1902)
- Ramularia caricis U. Braun (1994)
- Ramularia carletonii (Ellis & Kellerm.) U. Braun (1988)
- Ramularia carneola (Sacc.) Nannf. (1950)
- Ramularia carniformis Ellis & Tracy ex Sherb. (1928)
- Ramularia carthami Zaprom. (1926)
- Ramularia carthamicola Darpoux (1946)
- Ramularia caruaniana Sacc. (1913)
- Ramularia cassiae T. Zhang & Z.Y. Zhang (2002)
- Ramularia castaneae (Sawada) U. Braun (1988)
- Ramularia castillejae Ellis & Everh. (1894)
- Ramularia catappae Racib. (1900)
- Ramularia celastri Ellis & G. Martin (1882)
- Ramularia centaureae Lindr. (1902)
- Ramularia centaureae-atropurpureae Bubák (1907)
- Ramularia centaureae-jaceae U. Braun (1993)
- Ramularia centaureae-scabiosae U. Braun (1988)
- Ramularia centranthi Brunaud (1887)
- Ramularia cerasorum Marchal & É.J. Marchal (1921)
- Ramularia cerastii I.E. Brezhnev (1939)
- Ramularia cerastiicola (Crous) Videira & Crous (2016)
- Ramularia ceratocarpi Golovin (1950)
- Ramularia cercidis H. Zhang & Z.Y. Zhang (2003)
- Ramularia cercosporelloides U. Braun & Crous (1998)
- Ramularia cercosporoides Ellis & Everh. (1895)
- Ramularia cerinthes Hollós (1909)
- Ramularia cervina Speg. (1879)
- Ramularia chaerophylli Ferraris (1902)
- Ramularia chalcedonica Allesch. (1894)
- Ramularia chamaedryos (Lindr.) Gunnerb. (1967)
- Ramularia chamaepeucis Ranoj. (1914)
- Ramularia chamerionis Rostr. (1885)
- Ramularia chelidonii (Jacz.) Karak. (1937)
- Ramularia chesneyae (W.P. Golovina) U. Braun (1988)
- Ramularia chimaphilae H.C. Greene (1949)
- Ramularia chlorina Bres. (1900)
- Ramularia chorisiae Viégas (1946)
- Ramularia chorisporae Lobik (1928)
- Ramularia chrysopsidis Dearn. (1929)
- Ramularia cichorii Dearn. & House (1916)
- Ramularia cicutae P. Karst. (1884)
- Ramularia cilinodis Davis (1922)
- Ramularia circumfusa Ellis & Everh. (1895)
- Ramularia cirsii Allesch. (1892)
- Ramularia cirsii-eriophori U. Braun (1988)
- Ramularia cissampeloides N. Srivast. & Kamal (1995)
- Ramularia citri Penz. (1882)
- Ramularia citricola Crous & Guarnaccia (2016)
- Ramularia claytoniae W.B. Cooke (1950)
- Ramularia clematidis Dearn. & Barthol. (1917)
- Ramularia clerodendri Sawada (1944)
- Ramularia coccinea (Fuckel) Vestergr. (1900)
- Ramularia cochleariae Cooke (1883)
- Ramularia codonocephali Annal. (1978)
- Ramularia codonopsidis (Golovin) U. Braun (1998)
- Ramularia coicis S.K. Singh, P.N. Singh & Waing. (2005)
- Ramularia coleosporii Sacc. (1880)
- Ramularia coleosporium Sacc. (1886)
- Ramularia collo-cygni B. Sutton & J.M. Waller (1988)
- Ramularia compacta (Ellis & Everh.) U. Braun (1990)
- Ramularia concomitans Ellis & Holw. (1888)
- Ramularia conferta (Syd. & P. Syd.) U. Braun (1988)
- Ramularia conspicua Syd. & P. Syd. (1903)
- Ramularia constricta (Penz.) Wollenw. (1935)
- Ramularia contexta Ellis & Everh. (1894)
- Ramularia convolvuli Zaprom. (1928)
- Ramularia coprosmae U. Braun & C.F. Hill (2003)
- Ramularia corcontica Bubák & Kabát (1903)
- Ramularia coriandri Moesz & Smarods (1930)
- Ramularia coronillae Bres. (1900)
- Ramularia corthusae Săvul. & Sandu (1933)
- Ramularia cortusae Petr. (1925)
- Ramularia corydalina U. Braun, Chevassut & Pellic. (1998)
- Ramularia corydalis Osipian (1975)
- Ramularia coryli Chevassut (1998)
- Ramularia cousiniae Vasyag. (1973)
- Ramularia crambicola Annal. (1978)
- Ramularia craspediicola U. Braun & Priest (2005)
- Ramularia crassiuscula (Unger) U. Braun (1988)
- Ramularia crepidis Ellis & Everh. (1888)
- Ramularia crupinae Dianese, Hasan & Sobhian (1996)
- Ramularia crypta Cooke (1883)
- Ramularia cryptostegiae Pim (1881)
- Ramularia cucurbitae (Sacc.) U. Braun (1988)
- Ramularia cupulariae Pass. (1876)
- Ramularia curvula Fautrey (1895)
- Ramularia cyclaminicola Trel. (1916)
- Ramularia cylindriopsis Peck (1898)
- Ramularia cylindroides Sacc. (1882)
- Ramularia cylindrosporoides J.A. Stev. (1918)
- Ramularia cynarae Sacc. (1879)
- Ramularia cynoglossi Lindr. (1902)

== D ==
- Ramularia dacica Săvul. & Hulea (1940)
- Ramularia daniloi Bubák (1906)
- Ramularia davisiana U. Braun (1994)
- Ramularia decipiens Ellis & Everh. (1885)
- Ramularia delphinii Jaap (1913)
- Ramularia delphiniicola U. Braun (1991)
- Ramularia dentariae Poetsch & Schied. (1894)
- Ramularia desmodii Cooke (1878)
- Ramularia despermae Arch. Singh, Sh. Kumar, Raghv. Singh & D.K. Agarwal (2008)
- Ramularia destruens Peck (1891)
- Ramularia deusta (Fuckel) Karak. (1937)
- Ramularia dianthi Lindau (1906)
- Ramularia dichosciadii Petr. (1955)
- Ramularia didyma Unger (1832)
- Ramularia didymarioides Briard & Har. (1891)
- Ramularia diervillae Peck (1885)
- Ramularia digitalis (Fuckel) U. Braun (2020)
- Ramularia digitalis-ambiguae Arx (1949)
- Ramularia dioscoreae Ellis & Everh. (1891)
- Ramularia dipsaci Allesch. (1887)
- Ramularia dispar Davis (1919)
- Ramularia dispersa Davis (1929)
- Ramularia doliariae Viégas (1946)
- Ramularia dolomitica Kabát & Bubák (1904)
- Ramularia doronicella Ferraris (1910)
- Ramularia doronici Pass. & Thüm. (1881)
- Ramularia dracocephali Vasyag. (1973)
- Ramularia dryopteridacearum U. Braun (1998)

== E ==
- Ramularia eamesii Dearn. & House (1921)
- Ramularia echii Bondartsev (1921)
- Ramularia effusa Peck (1880)
- Ramularia enecans Magnus (1895)
- Ramularia epilobiana (Sacc. & Fautrey) B. Sutton & Piroz. (1963)
- Ramularia epilobii (Schnabl) W.G. Schneid. ex Trail (1889)
- Ramularia epilobii-palustris Allesch. (1893)
- Ramularia epilobii-parviflori Lindr. (1902)
- Ramularia epilobii-rosei Lindau (1906)
- Ramularia epipactidis U. Braun & Rogerson (1993)
- Ramularia episphaeria (Desm.) Gunnerb. (1967)
- Ramularia epistroma Moesz & Smarods (1938)
- Ramularia equinosa Unger (1832)
- Ramularia eremostachydis Zaprom. (1928)
- Ramularia erigerontis Gonz. Frag. (1917)
- Ramularia erigerontis-annui Sawada (1958)
- Ramularia eriodendri Racib. (1900)
- Ramularia eriogoni U. Braun (1994)
- Ramularia eriophylli U. Braun (1994)
- Ramularia erodii Bres. (1897)
- Ramularia eryngii Jacz. (1917)
- Ramularia eucalypti Crous (2007)
- Ramularia eudidyma Wollenw. (1913)
- Ramularia euonymi Ellis & Kellerm. (1885)
- Ramularia euonymicola Videira, H.D. Shin, U. Braun & Crous (2016)
- Ramularia euphorbiacearum Arch. Singh, Sh. Kumar, Raghv. Singh & D.K. Agarwal (2008)
- Ramularia eurotiae Kalymb. (1962)
- Ramularia evanida (J.G. Kühn) Sacc. (1886)
- Ramularia exilis Syd. & P. Syd. (1905)
- Ramularia eximia Bubák (1903)

== F ==
- Ramularia fagarae Sawada (1944)
- Ramularia fagopyri Abramov ex U. Braun (1991)
- Ramularia falcariae Savinceva (1972)
- Ramularia farinosa (Bonord.) Sacc. (1886)
- Ramularia filaris Fresen. (1863)
- Ramularia filarszkyana Moesz (1924)
- Ramularia flammulae Roiv. (1953)
- Ramularia foeniculi Sibilia (1932)
- Ramularia formosana Sawada (1943)
- Ramularia fragariae Peck (1880)
- Ramularia fraxinea Davis (1915)
- Ramularia frutescens Kabát & Bubák (1905)
- Ramularia fumariae Speg. (1910)
- Ramularia fuscosora Muhr & Tønsberg (1989)

== G ==
- Ramularia galegae Sacc. (1882)
- Ramularia galeopsidis Bubák (1913)
- Ramularia galii Chevassut (1992)
- Ramularia gardeniae C. Massal. (1909)
- Ramularia gaultheriae Videira & Crous (2016)
- Ramularia gei (Fuckel) Lindau (1910)
- Ramularia gei-aleppici Săvul. & Sandu (1933)
- Ramularia geranii Fuckel (1870)
- Ramularia geraniicola Videira & Crous (2016)
- Ramularia geranii-sanguinei C. Massal. (1900)
- Ramularia geranii-silvatici Vestergr. (1900)
- Ramularia giliae R. Sprague (1937)
- Ramularia glauca Ellis & Everh. (1903)
- Ramularia glechomatis U. Braun (1993)
- Ramularia glehniae Savile (1965)
- Ramularia glennii Videira & Crous (2014)
- Ramularia glycinicola U. Braun & Bagyan. (1998)
- Ramularia glycyrrhizae Vasyag. (1957)
- Ramularia gnaphalii (P. Syd.) Karak. (1937)
- Ramularia golovinii U. Braun (1998)
- Ramularia gossypii (Speg.) Cif. (1962)
- Ramularia gracilipes Davis (1926)
- Ramularia gracilispora U. Braun (1993)
- Ramularia grantii Dearn. (1929)
- Ramularia gratiolae U. Braun & Scheuer (2008)
- Ramularia grevilleana (Tul. & C. Tul. ex Oudem.) Jørst. (1945)
- Ramularia grewiae Lacy & Thirum. (1951)
- Ramularia grewiae-occidentalis Crous & U. Braun (1995)
- Ramularia grindeliae Ellis & Kellerm. (1884)
- Ramularia gunnerae (Speg.) U. Braun (1994)
- Ramularia gymnematis T.S. Ramakr. & Sundaram (1954)

== H ==
- Ramularia hamamelidis Peck (1884)
- Ramularia hamburgensis Lindau (1906)
- Ramularia harae Henn. (1905)
- Ramularia haroldporteri Videira & Crous (2014)
- Ramularia hayachinensis (Togashi & Onuma) U. Braun (1998)
- Ramularia heimerliana Magnus (1909)
- Ramularia helianthi Ellis & Everh. (1897)
- Ramularia hellebori Fuckel (1870)
- Ramularia helminthiae Bremer & Petr. (1947)
- Ramularia helvetica Jaap & Lindau (1907)
- Ramularia heraclei (Oudem.) Sacc. (1886)
- Ramularia hesperidis Săvul. & Sandu (1940)
- Ramularia heteropappi Annal. (1981)
- Ramularia heucherae (Dearn.) U. Braun (1993)
- Ramularia hieracii Ranoj. (1918)
- Ramularia hieracii-umbellati A.G. Eliasson (1915)
- Ramularia holci-lanati (Cavara) Deighton (1972)
- Ramularia hornemannii Lindr. (1902)
- Ramularia hughesiana (Sacc.) U. Braun (1988)
- Ramularia hydrangeae Y.L. Guo & U. Braun (1998)
- Ramularia hydrangeae-macrophyllae U. Braun & C.F. Hill (2008)
- Ramularia hydrangeicola J.H. Park & H.D. Shin (2016)
- Ramularia hylomeconis Naumov (1914)
- Ramularia hyperici U. Braun & Scheuer (1995)
- Ramularia hypericicola U. Braun (1998)
- Ramularia hypochaeridis Magnus (1896)

== I ==
- Ramularia impatientis Peck (1883)
- Ramularia imperatoriae Lindau (1907)
- Ramularia inae Vanev & Negrean (1992)
- Ramularia inaequalis (Preuss) U. Braun (1998)
- Ramularia incarvilleae Golovin (1950)
- Ramularia indica K.L. Kothari, M.K. Bhatn. & N.S. Bhatt (1967)
- Ramularia interstitialis (Berk. & Broome) Gunnerb. & Constant. (1991)
- Ramularia inulae (Sacc.) Höhn. (1906)
- Ramularia ionophila Davis (1915)
- Ramularia ipomoeae F. Stevens (1925)
- Ramularia iranica Petr. (1949)
- Ramularia iridis (Ellis & Halst.) U. Braun (1994)
- Ramularia isarioides (Sacc.) Ellis & Everh. (1885)
- Ramularia islandica Jørst. (1963)
- Ramularia ivae Dearn. (1929)
- Ramularia iwateyamensis Togashi (1936)

== J ==
- Ramularia jaapii Trotter (1931)
- Ramularia jacobeae Ranoj. (1918)
- Ramularia jaczevskii (Negru & Vlad) U. Braun (1988)
- Ramularia jordanovii Vanev & Bakalova (1983)
- Ramularia jubatskana (Sacc.) U. Braun (1993)
- Ramularia jurineae Hollós (1907)

== K ==
- Ramularia kabatiana Bubák (1902)
- Ramularia karakulinii N.P. Golovina (1964)
- Ramularia karelii (Petr.) U. Braun (1988)
- Ramularia karstenii Sacc. (1895)
- Ramularia keithii Massee (1893)
- Ramularia khandalensis Patw. & A.K. Pande (1970)
- Ramularia kiggelariae Sacc. (1881)

== L ==
- Ramularia lactea (Desm.) Sacc. (1882)
- Ramularia lactucae Jaap (1905)
- Ramularia lactucosa Lambotte & Fautrey (1898)
- Ramularia lamii Fuckel (1870)
- Ramularia lamiicola C. Massal. (1890)
- Ramularia lamiigena M. Bakhshi, Zare & Jafary (2021)
- Ramularia lanceolata Dearn. & House (1918)
- Ramularia lanosa (Jacz.) U. Braun (1998)
- Ramularia lapponica Lindr. (1902)
- Ramularia lappulae (Davis) Davis (1926)
- Ramularia lapsanae (Desm.) Sacc. (1881)
- Ramularia lata Sacc. (1879)
- Ramularia lathyri W.B. Cooke & C.G. Shaw (1952)
- Ramularia leeae S.K. Singh, P.N. Singh & Waing. (2005)
- Ramularia leontodontis Moesz (1926)
- Ramularia leonuri Sorokīn (1872)
- Ramularia leptospora Speg. (1910)
- Ramularia lethalis Ellis & Everh. (1891)
- Ramularia levistici Oudem. (1886)
- Ramularia libanotidis Bubák (1907)
- Ramularia ligusticicola U. Braun (1994)
- Ramularia ligustrina Maubl. (1906)
- Ramularia liliicola Alé-Agha, U. Braun & Feige (2005)
- Ramularia linariae Baudyš & Picb. (1924)
- Ramularia lineola Peck (1880)
- Ramularia lini Lebedeva (1921)
- Ramularia liriodendri Ellis & Everh. (1888)
- Ramularia lithospermi Lebedeva (1921)
- Ramularia lobeliae Sawada ex X.X. Zeng & Z.Y. Zhang (2006)
- Ramularia lolii (Volkart) U. Braun (1988)
- Ramularia lomatiicola U. Braun (1994)
- Ramularia lonicerae Voglino (1904)
- Ramularia lophanthi Ellis & Everh. (1897)
- Ramularia loticola C. Massal. (1906)
- Ramularia ludoviciana Minter, B.L. Brady & R.A. Hall (1983)
- Ramularia lupinicola (Pollack) U. Braun (1988)
- Ramularia lychnidicola Cooke (1885)
- Ramularia lycopodis Hollós (1907)
- Ramularia lysimachiae Thüm. (1874)
- Ramularia lysimachiarum Lindr. (1902)

== M ==
- Ramularia maclurae (Ellis & Langl.) U. Braun (1988)
- Ramularia macrospora Fresen. (1863)
- Ramularia macularis (J. Schröt.) Sacc. & P. Syd. (1899)
- Ramularia maculicola U. Braun & Rogerson (1993)
- Ramularia maculiformis Unger (1832)
- Ramularia magnusiana (Sacc.) Lindau (1906)
- Ramularia major (Unger) U. Braun (1988)
- Ramularia malachii Ying X. Wang & Xue Y. Wang (1997)
- Ramularia mali Videira & Crous (2014)
- Ramularia malicola Videira & Crous (2016)
- Ramularia malvae Fuckel (1870)
- Ramularia marrubii C. Massal.( 1889)
- Ramularia martianoffiana Thüm. (1878)
- Ramularia matricariae Antok. ex Vassiljevsky & Karak. (1937)
- Ramularia matronalis Sacc. (1880)
- Ramularia medicaginis Bondartsev & Lebedeva (1914)
- Ramularia melampyri Ellis & Dearn. (1893)
- Ramularia melampyrina C. Massal. (1900)
- Ramularia meliloti Ellis & Everh. (1894)
- Ramularia melittis (Unamuno) U. Braun (1988)
- Ramularia menthae Thüm. (1880)
- Ramularia menthicola Sacc. (1886)
- Ramularia menyanthis Magnus ex Sacc. (1913)
- Ramularia mercurialis-perennis Roum. (1891)
- Ramularia miae Crous (2006)
- Ramularia michauxioidis Magnus (1903)
- Ramularia microlepiae F. Stevens (1925)
- Ramularia microlepis F. Stevens (1925)
- Ramularia micromeriae Gonz. Frag. (1927)
- Ramularia microspora Thüm. (1877)
- Ramularia millettiae Z.Y. Zhang & Yong H. He (2003)
- Ramularia mimuli Ellis & Kellerm. (1883)
- Ramularia minax Davis (1922)
- Ramularia minutissima (P. Syd.) U. Braun (1988)
- Ramularia mirim Viégas (1946)
- Ramularia modesta Sacc. (1882)
- Ramularia moehringiae Lindr. (1902)
- Ramularia momordicae Heald & F.A. Wolf (1911)
- Ramularia monachorum Bubák (1915)
- Ramularia monilioides (Ellis & G. Martin) Ellis & Everh. (1885)
- Ramularia montenegrina Bubák (1906)
- Ramularia monticola Speg. (1881)
- Ramularia muehlenbeckiae U. Braun & Priest (2005)
- Ramularia mulgedii (Bubák) Bubák (1916)
- Ramularia multiplex Peck (1885)
- Ramularia myosotidis Vassiljevsky (1937)
- Ramularia myxophaga Javoron. (1914)

== N ==
- Ramularia nagornyi Karak. (1937)
- Ramularia nambuana Henn. (1904)
- Ramularia narcissi Chittend. (1906)
- Ramularia narkandensis Deighton (1973)
- Ramularia nasturtii (Pospelov) U. Braun (1988)
- Ramularia necator Massee (1907)
- Ramularia nemopanthi Clinton & Peck (1878)
- Ramularia neodeusta Videira & Crous (2016)
- Ramularia nephrolepidis F. Stevens (1925)
- Ramularia nerii-indici T. Zhang & Gui (2003)
- Ramularia nevodovskii Vasyag. (1973)
- Ramularia nicolai Bubák (1903)
- Ramularia nigricans (C. Massal.) Ferraris (1921)
- Ramularia nigromaculans Shear (1931)
- Ramularia nikitinii Annal. (1981))
- Ramularia nivea Kabát & Bubák (1904)
- Ramularia nivosa (Ellis & Everh.) W.B. Cooke & C.G. Shaw (1952)
- Ramularia nodosa Tho (1972)
- Ramularia noneae Lobik (1928)
- Ramularia norvegicae Peck (1880)
- Ramularia nymphaeae Bres. (1894)
- Ramularia nymphaearum (Allesch.) Ramsb. (1931)
- Ramularia nyssicola (Cooke) Videira & Crous (2014)

== O ==
- Ramularia obducens Thüm. (1881)
- Ramularia obliqua (Cooke) Oudem. (1873)
- Ramularia oblongispora Casp. (1907)
- Ramularia occidentalis Ellis & Kellerm. (1887)
- Ramularia occulta (Sacc.) U. Braun (1988)
- Ramularia ochracea (Fuckel) U. Braun (1991)
- Ramularia onobrychidis Allesch. (1892)
- Ramularia onopordi C. Massal. (1899)
- Ramularia onosmatis Byzova (1973)
- Ramularia ontariensis Sacc. (1914)
- Ramularia oplopanacis U. Braun & Crous (2003)
- Ramularia oreophila Sacc. (1881)
- Ramularia organi N.P. Golovina (1960)
- Ramularia origani N.P. Golovina (1960)
- Ramularia origanicola Chevassut (1992)
- Ramularia orontii Ellis & G. Martin (1884)
- Ramularia osmorhizae U. Braun (1994)
- Ramularia osterici Videira, H.D. Shin & Crous (2016)
- Ramularia ovata Fuckel (1870)
- Ramularia ovularioides H.C. Greene (1947)
- Ramularia oxalidis Farl. (1884)
- Ramularia oxyriae-digynae Gjaerum (1971)

== P ==
- Ramularia pachysandrae U. Braun (1993)
- Ramularia paeoniae Voglino (1905)
- Ramularia pakistanica S.A. Khan & M. Kamal (1969)
- Ramularia paludosa Fr. (1849)
- Ramularia panacicola Zinssm. (1918)
- Ramularia pararhabdospora Crous (2021)
- Ramularia parietariae Pass. (1876)
- Ramularia paspali (Deighton) U. Braun (1990)
- Ramularia pastinacae-sativae U. Braun (1988)
- Ramularia paulula Davis (1909)
- Ramularia peckii Sacc. & P. Syd. (1899)
- Ramularia penstemonis W.B. Cooke & C.G. Shaw (1950)
- Ramularia periplocae Vanev (1992)
- Ramularia persicariicola U. Braun & C.F. Hill (2004)
- Ramularia petasitis (Bäumler) Jaap (1916)
- Ramularia petasitis-tomentosae Săvul. & Sandu (1933)
- Ramularia petrakiana Moesz (1926)
- Ramularia petuniae Cooke (1891)
- Ramularia peucedani Hollós (1909)
- Ramularia phacae-frigidae (E. Müll. & Wehm.) Videira & Crous (2016)
- Ramularia phaceliae Bonar (1946)
- Ramularia phaseoli Klotzsch (1882)
- Ramularia phaseolina Petr. (1950)
- Ramularia phellodendri Y.X. Wang (1996)
- Ramularia philadelphi Sacc. (1877)
- Ramularia phlogis U. Braun (1994)
- Ramularia phlomidicola Lobik (1928)
- Ramularia phlomidis Bondartsev & Lebedeva (1914)
- Ramularia phormii Cockayne (1921)
- Ramularia phyllostictae-michauxoidis Magnus (1903)
- Ramularia phyteumatis Sacc. & G. Winter (1882)
- Ramularia picridicola Lindr. (1902)
- Ramularia picridis Fautrey & Roum. (1892)
- Ramularia pimpinellae Jaap (1908)
- Ramularia pistaciae Crous (2019)
- Ramularia pistiae R.C. Fern. & R.W. Barreto (2005)
- Ramularia pivensis Bubák (1915)
- Ramularia pleuropteri U. Braun (1991)
- Ramularia plurivora Videira & Crous (2014)
- Ramularia poagena U. Braun (1994)
- Ramularia polemonii W.B. Cooke & C.G. Shaw (1952)
- Ramularia polygalae (J. Schröt.) Sacc. & P. Syd. (1899)
- Ramularia polygoni Pandotra & Ganguly (1964)
- Ramularia pratensis Sacc. (1882)
- Ramularia prenanthis Jaap (1906)
- Ramularia primulae Thüm. (1878)
- Ramularia primulana (P. Karst.) P. Karst. (1884)
- Ramularia prini Peck (1885)
- Ramularia prismatocarpi Oudem. (1877)
- Ramularia proteae Crous & Summerell (2000)
- Ramularia pruinosa Speg. (1879)
- Ramularia prunellae Ellis & Everh. (1889)
- Ramularia pseudococcinea Lindr. (1902)
- Ramularia pseudodecipiens U. Braun (1992)
- Ramularia pseudogeranii U. Braun (1988)
- Ramularia pseudoglobosa U. Braun (1990)
- Ramularia pseudolotophaga U. Braun (1990)
- Ramularia pseudomaculiformis (Desm.) Rossman & W.C. Allen (2016)
- Ramularia pseudorubella U. Braun (1994)
- Ramularia psoraleae Ellis & Everh. (1894)
- Ramularia pteridicola Petr. (1927)
- Ramularia puccinioides Sorokīn (1871)
- Ramularia puerariae Sawada (1943)
- Ramularia pulchella Ces. (1853)
- Ramularia punctiformis Sacc. (1904)
- Ramularia purpurascens G. Winter (1884)
- Ramularia pusilla Unger (1832)

== R ==
- Ramularia rabdosiae Z.Y. Zhang & W.Q. Chen (2003)
- Ramularia ramosa Golovin (1952)
- Ramularia ranoievichii Karak. (1937)
- Ramularia ranunculi-carpa Săvul. & Sandu (1931)
- Ramularia ranunculi-carpatici Săvul. & Sandu (1931)
- Ramularia ranunculicola Pirnia & U. Braun (2018)
- Ramularia ranunculi-lyallii Dearn. & Barthol. (1917)
- Ramularia ranunculi-montani (C. Massal.) U. Braun (1993)
- Ramularia ranunculi-muricati Jørst. (1962)
- Ramularia ranunculi-oxyspermi Lobik (1928)
- Ramularia rapunculoides Nannf. (1950)
- Ramularia recognita C. Massal. (1894)
- Ramularia repens Ellis & Everh. (1891)
- Ramularia repentis Oudem. (1902)
- Ramularia reticulata Ellis & Everh. (1894)
- Ramularia rhabdospora (Berk. & Broome) Nannf. (1950)
- Ramularia rhaetica (Sacc. & G. Winter) Jaap (1917)
- Ramularia rhamnigena (Ellis & Everh.) U. Braun (1988)
- Ramularia rhei Allesch. (1896)
- Ramularia rhombica Matsush. (1975)
- Ramularia rhopalostylidis U. Braun (2013)
- Ramularia richardiae Kalchbr. & Cooke (1880)
- Ramularia rigidula (Delacr.) Nannf. (1950)
- Ramularia robiciana (W. Voss) U. Braun (1988)
- Ramularia rollandii Fautrey (1897)
- Ramularia rosea Sacc. (1882)
- Ramularia rubella (Bonord.) Nannf. (1950)
- Ramularia rubicola Ershad (2000)
- Ramularia rubicunda Bres. (1896)
- Ramularia rudbeckiae Peck (1883)
- Ramularia rufibasis (Berk. & Broome) Gunnerb. & Constant. (1991)
- Ramularia rufomaculans Peck (1883)
- Ramularia rumicicola Videira, H.D. Shin & Crous (2016)
- Ramularia rumicis Kalchbr. & Cooke (1880)
- Ramularia rumicis-crispi Sawada (1943)
- Ramularia rumicis-scutati Allesch. (1900)
- Ramularia rutae-murariae Trotter (1931)

== S ==
- Ramularia sabaudica F. Mangenot (1958)
- Ramularia salviae Bondartsev (1921)
- Ramularia salviae-pratensis Pellic. & U. Braun (1998)
- Ramularia salviicola Tharp (1917)
- Ramularia sambucina Sacc. (1882)
- Ramularia sanguisorbicola U. Braun (1994)
- Ramularia saniculae Linh. (1883)
- Ramularia saprophytica Bubák (1906)
- Ramularia saxifragae (J. Schröt.) Sacc. & P. Syd. (1899)
- Ramularia saximontanensis Solheim (1943)
- Ramularia scabiosae Lind (1913)
- Ramularia scelerata Cooke (1885)
- Ramularia schisandrae Ablak. & Koval (1961)
- Ramularia schroeteri J.G. Kühn (1881)
- Ramularia schulzeri Bäumler (1888)
- Ramularia schwarziana (Magnus) Gunnerb. (1967)
- Ramularia scirpi Deeva (1973)
- Ramularia scolopendrii Fautrey (1892)
- Ramularia scopoliae W. Voss (1883)
- Ramularia scorzonerae Jaap (1908)
- Ramularia scrophulariae Fautrey & Roum. (1891)
- Ramularia scutellariae Woron. (1927)
- Ramularia senecionis (Berk. & Broome) Sacc. (1886)
- Ramularia senecionis-platyphylli Siemaszko (1919)
- Ramularia sennenii Gonz. Frag. (1916)
- Ramularia sepium Dearn. & Bisby (1929)
- Ramularia septata (Bonord.) Bubák (1916)
- Ramularia serbica Ranoj. (1910)
- Ramularia serotina Ellis & Everh. (1889)
- Ramularia serratulae (Sacc.) Maia (1960)
- Ramularia serratulina Chevassut (1992)
- Ramularia sheldonii Trotter (1931)
- Ramularia sidalceae Ellis & Everh. (1888)
- Ramularia sideritidis Hollós (1907)
- Ramularia silenes P. Karst. (1891)
- Ramularia silenes-procumbentis Karak. (1915)
- Ramularia silenicola C. Massal. (1889)
- Ramularia simplex Pass. (1882)
- Ramularia smilacinae Davis (1907)
- Ramularia smyrnii-olusatri Unamuno (1942)
- Ramularia solani Sherb. (1915)
- Ramularia solenanthi N.P. Golovina (1960)
- Ramularia solheimii U. Braun (1988)
- Ramularia sonchi Dominik (1936)
- Ramularia sorbi Karak. (1937)
- Ramularia sorokinii Sacc. & P. Syd. (1899)
- Ramularia sparganii Rostr. (1883)
- Ramularia spegazzinii Sacc. (1886)
- Ramularia sphaeroidea Sacc. (1878)
- Ramularia spinaciae Nypels (1898)
- Ramularia spiraeae Peck (1883)
- Ramularia spiraeae-arunci Sacc. (1892)
- Ramularia stachydis (Pass.) C. Massal. (1889)
- Ramularia stachydis-alpinae Allesch. (1892)
- Ramularia stachydis-germanicae Moesz (1940)
- Ramularia stachydis-palustris Pospelov (1964)
- Ramularia stachyopsidis Vasyag. (1973)
- Ramularia statices Rostr. (1904)
- Ramularia statices-latifoliae Săvul. & Sandu (1933)
- Ramularia stellariae Rabenh. (1871)
- Ramularia stellariicola (M.J. Park, J.H. Park & H.D. Shin) Videira, H.D. Shin & Crous (2016)
- Ramularia stellenboschensis Crous (2011)
- Ramularia stolonifer Ellis & Everh. (1891)
- Ramularia stroganoviae Annal. (1972)
- Ramularia subalpina Bubák (1903)
- Ramularia submodesta Höhn. (1902)
- Ramularia subtilis U. Braun & C.F. Hill (2006)
- Ramularia succisae Sacc. (1882)
- Ramularia sycina Sacc. & D. Sacc. (1902)
- Ramularia sylvestris Sacc. (1880)
- Ramularia symphoricarpi (Ellis & Everh.) U. Braun (1988)
- Ramularia symphyti-tuberosi (Allesch.) Jaap (1916)
- Ramularia synthyridis W.B. Cooke & C.G. Shaw (1952)
- Ramularia syringae H. Zhang & Z.Y. Zhang (2003)

== T ==
- Ramularia taleshina Bakhshi & Arzanlou (2017)
- Ramularia tanaceti Lind (1905)
- Ramularia taraxaci P. Karst. (1884)
- Ramularia tecta U. Braun, Chevassut & Pellic. (1994)
- Ramularia telekiae Bubák & Wróbl. (1916)
- Ramularia tenella U. Braun & C.F. Hill (2006)
- Ramularia tenuior Fautrey & Brunaud (1894)
- Ramularia tenuis Davis (1924)
- Ramularia tenuissima Fr. (1849)
- Ramularia terrae-novae Savile (1965)
- Ramularia terskei Domashova (1960)
- Ramularia thalictri Hollós (1926)
- Ramularia theicola Curzi (1926)
- Ramularia thelypodii Clem. & E.S. Clem. (1908)
- Ramularia thesii (J. Schröt.) P. Syd. ex Sacc. (1899)
- Ramularia thrinciae Sacc. & Berl. (1885)
- Ramularia tiliae Lobik (1928)
- Ramularia tirolensis Maire (1910)
- Ramularia torrendii (Bres.) U. Braun (1988)
- Ramularia torvi Ellis & Everh. (1898)
- Ramularia tovarae Sawada ex U. Braun (1988)
- Ramularia trachystemonis Siemaszko (1915)
- Ramularia trautvetteriae C.G. Shaw & R. Sprague (1954)
- Ramularia triboutiana (Sacc. & Letendre) Nannf. (1950)
- Ramularia tricherae Lindr. (1902)
- Ramularia trifolii Jaap (1910)
- Ramularia trifoliicola U. Braun (1993)
- Ramularia trigonotidis Videira, H.D. Shin & Crous (2016)
- Ramularia triumfettae N. Srivast. & Kamal (1995)
- Ramularia trollii Iwanoff (1900)
- Ramularia trotteriana Sacc. (1902)
- Ramularia tuberculiniformis (Höhn.) U. Braun (1988)
- Ramularia tumescens (Fuckel) Sacc. (1886)

== U ==
- Ramularia ucrainica Petr. (1921)
- Ramularia ufensis Karak. (1915)
- Ramularia ulmariae Cooke (1876)
- Ramularia umbrina Davis (1919)
- Ramularia umbrosa A.L. Sm. & Ramsb. (1918)
- Ramularia undulata C. Bernard (1907)
- Ramularia uniseptata (Höhn.) Wollenw. (1924)
- Ramularia unterseheri Videira & Crous (2015)
- Ramularia uredinearum Hulea (1939)
- Ramularia uredinicola Khodap. & U. Braun (2005)
- Ramularia uredinis (W. Voss) Sacc. (1886)
- Ramularia urticae Ces. (1863)
- Ramularia ussuriensis Koval (1963)

== V ==
- Ramularia vaccarii Ferraris (1902)
- Ramularia vaccinii Peck (1884)
- Ramularia vacciniicola Crous & Thangavel (2017)
- Ramularia vagnerae Barthol. (1909)
- Ramularia valerianae (Speg.) Sacc. (1882)
- Ramularia vallisumbrosae Cavara (1899)
- Ramularia vancouveriae (Ellis & Everh.) R. Sprague (1937)
- Ramularia variabilis Fuckel (1870)
- Ramularia variata Davis (1919)
- Ramularia variegata Ellis & Holw. (1886)
- Ramularia variispora Golovin & Gapon. (1971)
- Ramularia verbasci Fuckel (1874)
- Ramularia veronicae Fuckel (1870)
- Ramularia veronicae-cymbalariae Kill. (1928)
- Ramularia veronicae-peduncularis Lobik (1928)
- Ramularia veronicicola Videira & Crous (2016)
- Ramularia vestergreniana Allesch. (1902)
- Ramularia viciae A.B. Frank (1881)
- Ramularia vincae Sacc. (1882)
- Ramularia vincetoxici Bres. (1920)
- Ramularia violae Fuckel (1870)
- Ramularia violae-brevistipulatae Togashi (1936)
- Ramularia violae-tricoloris Thüm. (1874)
- Ramularia viridis (Golovin) Pellic. & Guy García (2001)
- Ramularia viscariae Kabát & Bubák (1910)
- Ramularia vitis (Richon) U. Braun (1988)
- Ramularia vizellae Crous (2011)
- Ramularia vogeliana (Sacc., Syd. & P. Syd.) U. Braun (1988)
- Ramularia vossiana Thüm. (1879)

== W-Z ==
- Ramularia waldsteiniae Ellis & Davis (1903)
- Ramularia weberiana Videira & Crous (2016)
- Ramularia winteri Thüm. (1881)
- Ramularia wisconsina H.C. Greene (1951)
- Ramularia woronichinii G. Arnaud (1954)
- Ramularia xanthii Lobik (1928)
- Ramularia zeretelliana U. Braun (1988)
- Ramularia zinniae Crous & U. Braun (1995)
- Ramularia ziziphorae Panf. & Gapon. (1963)
