= Aphelenchoididea =

Scientific classification
- Kingdom: Animalia
- Phylum: Nematoda
- Class: Chromadorea
- Order: Rhabditida
- Suborder: Tylenchina
- Infraorder: Tylenchomorpha
- Superfamily: Aphelenchoididea; Skarbilovich, 1947

Families
- See text

Superfamily of roundworms

Aphelenchoididea is a nematode (roundworm) superfamily in the order Rhabditida. Its members can be found inside bodies of species from the families Lepidoptera and Blattodea.

== Taxonomy ==
As of 26 January 2018 recorded in WoRMS, the superfamily contains the following families:

- Aphelenchidae Fuchs, 1937
  - Aphelenchus Bastian, 1865
  - Paraphelenchus Micoletzky, 1922
- Aphelenchoididae Skarbilovich, 1947
  - Aphelenchoides
  - Paraseinura Timm, 1960

Records in ITIS contain the following two families as well:

- Myenchildae
- Paraphelenchidae

The following were formerly members of this superfamily, but are now assigned to other taxa:

- Acugutturidae: Now belongs to Panagrolaimida.
- Berntsenidae
- Ektaphelenchidae
- Entaphelenchidae
- Parasitaphelenchidae
- Seinuridae
