= List of geranium diseases =

This article is a list of diseases of geraniums (Pelargonium).

== Bacterial diseases ==
Bacterial diseases
Bacterial blight	Xanthomonas campestris pv. pelargonii
Bacterial fasciation	Rhodococcus fascians = Corynebacterium fascians
Bacterial leaf spot	Acidovorax sp. Pseudomonas cichorii Pseudomonas syringae
Crown gall	Agrobacterium tumefaciens
Southern wilt	Ralstonia solanacearum

== Fungal diseases ==
Fungal diseases
Armillaria root rot	Armillaria mellea
Black root rot	Thielaviopsis basicola
Blackleg Cutting rot	Pythium sp.
Botryosphaeria stem rot	Botryosphaeria ribis
Botrytis blight	Botrytis cinerea
Cottony stem rot	Sclerotinia sclerotiorum
Damping-off	Pythium sp. Rhizoctonia sp.
Downy mildew	Peronospora conglomerata
Fusarium cutting rot	Fusarium sp.
Glomerella stem rot	Glomerella cingulata
Leaf mold	Aspergillus fischerianus Diaporthe rudis = Diaporthe medusaea Botryosporium pulchrum
Leaf spot	Alternaria alternata = Alternaria tenuis Cercospora brunkii Bipolaris setariae Cochliobolus setariae [teleomorph] Bipolaris maydis Cochliobolus heterostrophus [teleomorph] Ascochyta spp. Discohainesia oenotherae Pleosphaerulina spp. Colletotrichum gloeosporioides Glomerella cingulata [teleomorph] Phyllosticta spp. Cylindrocladium scoparium Calonectria kyotensis [teleomorph]
Phytophthora root rot	Phytophthora spp.
Powdery mildew	Erysiphe geraniacearum Neoerysiphe geranii Podosphaera fugax
Pythium root rot	Pythium spp.
Rhizoctonia root and crown rot	Rhizoctonia solani Thanatephorus cucumeris [teleomorph]
Rust	Puccinia pelargonii-zonalis
Verticillium wilt	Verticillium albo-atrum Verticillium dahliae

== Virus diseases ==
Virus diseases
Leaf cupping and curling	Beet curly top virus
Mosaic	Arabis mosaic virus Cucumber mosaic virus Tobacco mosaic virus Impatiens necrotic spot virus Tobacco rattle virus
Pelargonium flower break	Pelargonium flower break virus
Pelargonium line pattern	Pelargonium line pattern virus
Pelargonium ring pattern	Pelargonium ring pattern virus
Pelargonium ringspot	Tomato ringspot virus Tobacco ringspot virus
Pelargonium zonale spot	Pelargonium zonate spot virus
Vein clearing	Pelargonium vein clearing virus

== Nematodes, parasitic ==
Nematodes, parasitic
Foliar nematode	Aphelenchoides coffeae Aphelenchoides fragariae
Nematodes	Pratylenchus pratensis Tylenchorhynchus dubius Xiphinema americanum
Root knot	Meloidogyne arenaria Meloidogyne hapla Meloidogyne incognita

== Miscellaneous diseases and disorders ==
Miscellaneous diseases and disorders

Edema (Oedema)
Moisture imbalance in plants when soil is warm and wet while the air is cool and wet
Leaf bleaching
Heat stress
Yellow net vein
