= List of cyclamen diseases =

This article is a list of diseases of cyclamens (Cyclamen persicum).

== Bacterial diseases ==
Bacterial diseases
Bacterial soft rot	Erwinia chrysanthemi
Southern wilt	Ralstonia solanacearum = Pseudomonas solanacearum

== Fungal diseases ==
Fungal diseases
Anthracnose	Colletotrichum gloeosporioides Glomerella cingulata [teleomorph] Cryptocline cyclaminis Trochila sp. [teleomorph]
Black root rot	Thielaviopsis basicola Chalara elegans [synanamorph]
Botrytis blight	Botrytis cinerea
Cylindrocarpon root and crown rot	Cylindrocarpon destructans
Cylindrocladiella root rot	Cylindrocladiella peruviana
Cyclamen stunt	Ramularia cyclaminicola
Damping-off	Phoma exigua
Fusarium root and crown rot	Fusarium oxysporum
Fusarium wilt	Fusarium oxysporum f. sp. cyclaminis
Phyllosticta leaf spot	Phyllosticta cyclaminicola Phyllosticta cyclaminis
Powdery mildew	Pseudoidium cyclaminis
Rhizoctonia crown rot	Rhizoctonia solani

== Nematodes, parasitic ==
Nematodes, parasitic
Foliar nematodes	Aphelenchoides fragariae Aphelenchoides ritzemabosi
Root-knot nematode	Meloidogyne incognita
Stem and bulb nematode	Ditylenchus dipsaci

== Virus and viroid diseases ==
Virus and viroid diseases
Cucumber mosaic	genus Cucumovirus, Cucumber mosaic virus(CMV)
Impatiens necrotic spot	genus Tospovirus, Impatiens necrotic spot virus (INSV)
Potato X	genus Potexvirus, Potato virus X (PVX)
Spotted wilt	genus Tospovirus, Tomato spotted wilt virus (TSWV)
Tobacco mosaic	genus Tobamovirus, Tobacco mosaic virus (TMV)
Tomato aspermy	genus Cucumovirus, Tomato aspermy virus (TAV)

== Phytoplasmal diseases ==
Phytoplasmal diseases
Yellows	Phytoplasma
