= Avenae =

Avenae may refer to:

- Acidovorax avenae, former scientific name for Acidovorax citrulli
- Aphelenchus avenae, nematode
- Cymindis avenae, species of ground beetle
- Erysiphe graminis f. sp. avenae, plant pathogen
- Gaeumannomyces graminis var. avenae, plant pathogen
- Heterodera avenae, plant pathogen
- Puccinia coronata f.sp. avenae, plant pathogen
- Pyrenophora avenae, species of fungus
- Sitobion avenae, aphid
- Spermospora avenae, plant pathogen
- Stagonospora avenae f.sp. triticae, plant pathogen
- Ustilago avenae, plant pathogen
