= Bursaphelenchus cocophilus =

Scientific classification
- Domain: Eukaryota
- Kingdom: Animalia
- Phylum: Nematoda
- Class: Secernentea
- Order: Aphelenchida
- Family: Parasitaphelenchidae
- Genus: Bursaphelenchus
- Species: B. cocophilus

Binomial name
- Bursaphelenchus cocophilus (Cobb, 1919)

Synonyms
- Rhadinaphelenchus cocophilus

Nematode causing red ring disease of oilpalm trees

The red ring disease of coconuts and African oil palms is caused by the nematode Bursaphelenchus cocophilus. It is also identified in literature with an alternative scientific name Rhadinaphelenchus cocophilus. The common name, red ring nematode, is derived from its distinguishing symptom.

== Significance ==
This nematode can cause losses up to 80% in Elaeis guineensis (oilpalm) plantations, however, the losses typically range from 10 to 15% on coconut palms and oil palms. The most economically severe losses are in coconut, oilpalm, and dates. (Note: p. 315, "Bursaphelenchus cocophilus (red ring nematode) is vectored by Rhynchophorus palmarum weevils and causes red ring disease in several palm species in the Caribbean and Latin America.") (Note: p. 322, "Hosts of B. cocophilus are confined to the family Palmae, where the nematode is known to infect more than 17 species. Most palm species appear to be susceptible to inoculation by the nematode, but resulting disease severity and symptoms (red ring) are variable.") (Note: p. 322, "The most economically important species attacked by B. cocophilus are coconut palm, the African oil palm, and the date palm.") It and B. xylophilus are the only two economically significant diseases in Bursaphelenchus. (Note: p. 321, "Bursaphelenchus xylophilus and B. cocophilus are the only species of economic importance within the genus (45).") B. cocophilus is among the most commonly prohibited and/or inspected-for nematode plant diseases in the world. (Note: p. 324, "As a consequence, several of these nematodes are regulated. Lehman (53) arranged a list of plant-parasitic nematodes most frequently regulated in international trade. Out of the 15 regulated species on his list, 8 species are migratory endoparasitic nematodes: ... B. cocophilus.)

== Distribution ==
This nematode is distributed in Central and South America, and some of the islands in the Caribbean.

== Hosts ==
Over 17 of the Palmae, probably over half of them.

== Identification ==
The distinguishing characteristics of this nematode are a well-developed metacorpus from J2 through adult, a short stylet 11-15 μm in adults, adults typically 1mm in length. Females have the vulva located two-thirds body length and have a vulval flap. Females have a long post uterine sac and a rounded tail. Males have seven papillae in the tail region, distinct spicules, and bursa shaped as a spade.

== Life cycle ==
The red ring nematode follows a typical plant parasitic life cycle, having 4 molts before becoming an adult. The whole life cycle lasts approximately ten days. The survival/transmissible stage is the dauer. (Note: p. 315, "[Red Ring nematodes] have specialized survival stages, termed dauers, which are usually ectophoretic and use the insect for transport.") The survival stage is the J3. The dissemination of this nematode depends on its relationship with its vector. (Note: p 322, "INTERACTION WITH OTHER PATHOGENS Migratory endoparasitic nematodes live concomitantly and interact with other microorganisms, of which several are pathogens to the same host. ... A particular interaction is observed with a number of aphelenchid species, such as ... B. cocophilus, which need[s] an insect vector for [its] dissemination, the vector itself being a parasite of the common host.")

=== Insect vector relationship ===
The vector, Rhynchophorus palmarum (the South American palm weevil), carries the dauer/J3 stage to healthy palms. Female weevils are internally infested around the oviducts, when they lay their eggs in the palm they also disseminate the nematode.

== Host-parasite relationship ==
The symptoms produced by this nematode are chlorosis beginning in the oldest leaves and a distinct red/brownish ring in the trunk of the tree.

== Management ==
To manage this disease scouting is the most important aspect; early detection of infected trees may save plantations. If an infected tree is found it must be removed, treated with herbicide and cut down. Leaving the stump behind can lead to vector reproduction and spread the nematode. Trapping the vector is another strategy, reducing the disease incidence from 10% to 1%.

== Footnotes ==
- Moens, Maurice; Perry, Roland N. (2009). "Migratory Plant Endoparasitic Nematodes: A Group Rich in Contrasts and Divergence". Annual Review of Phytopathology. 47 (1). Annual Reviews: 313–332. doi:10.1146/annurev-phyto-080508-081846. ISSN 0066-4286. PMID 19400647.
