= List of foliage plant diseases (Polypodiaceae) =

This is a list of diseases of foliage plants belonging to the family Polypodiaceae.

== Plant Species ==
Plant species
Code	Scientifice Name	Common Name
A	Asplenium nidus	bird's nest fern
N	Nephrolepis exaltata	Boston fern
Pl	Platycerium spp.	staghorn fern
Pt	Pteris spp.	table fern

== Bacterial diseases ==
Bacterial diseases
Common name	Scientific name	Plants affected
Bacterial blight	Pseudomonas cichorii	A, Pl
Bacterial blight	Pseudomonas asplenii	A, Pl
Bacterial blight	Burkholderia gladioli	A, D, Pl, Pt

== Fungal diseases ==
Fungal diseases
Common name	Scientific name	Plants affected
Gray mold	Botrytis cinerea	D, N, Pt
Rhizoctonia aerial blight	Rhizoctonia solani	D, N, Pl, Pt

== Nematodes, parasitic ==
Nematodes, parasitic
Common name	Scientific name	Plants affected
Foliar nematodes	Aphelenchoides fragariae	A, N
Lesion nematode	Pratylenchus spp.	N
