= Aphelenchoidinae =

Scientific classification
- Domain: Eukaryota
- Kingdom: Animalia
- Phylum: Nematoda
- Class: Secernentea
- Order: Tylenchida
- Family: Aphelenchoididae
- Subfamily: Aphelenchoidinae; Skarbilovich, 1947

Genera
- Aphelenchoides; Laimaphelenchus; Megadorus; Punchaulus; Ruehmaphelenchus; Schistonchus; Sheraphelenchus; Tylaphelenchus

Subfamily of nematodes

Aphelenchoidinae is a nematode subfamily in the family Aphelenchoididae.
