= Schistonchus caprifici =

Scientific classification
- Domain: Eukaryota
- Kingdom: Animalia
- Phylum: Nematoda
- Class: Secernentea
- Order: Tylenchida
- Family: Aphelenchoididae
- Genus: Schistonchus
- Species: S. caprifici

Binomial name
- Schistonchus caprifici (Gasparrini, 1864) Cobb, 1927

Synonyms
- Anguillula caprifici Gasparrini, 1864

Species of nematode

Schistonchus caprifici is a plant parasitic nematode in the genus Schistonchus parasitizing the caprifig (Ficus carica sylvestris). It is found in Spain and Italy.

Blastophaga psenes is the vector of the nematode bringing it to the fig tree. This species is also transported by the cleptoparasite Philotrypesis caricae (Agaonidae).
