= Aphelenchoides subtenuis =

Scientific classification
- Domain: Eukaryota
- Kingdom: Animalia
- Phylum: Nematoda
- Class: Secernentea
- Order: Tylenchida
- Family: Aphelenchoididae
- Genus: Aphelenchoides
- Species: A. subtenuis

Binomial name
- Aphelenchoides subtenuis (Cobb, 1926) Steiner & Buhrer

Species of roundworm

Aphelenchoides subtenuis is a plant pathogenic nematode. It is an important cause of disease in daffodils (Narcissus).

== Bibliography ==
- Singh, S. K.; Hodda, M.; Ash, G. J. (August 2013). "Plant-parasitic nematodes of potential phytosanitary importance, their main hosts and reported yield losses". EPPO Bulletin. 43 (2): 334–374. doi:10.1111/epp.12050.
