= Strawberry foliar nematode =

Scientific classification
- Kingdom: Animalia
- Phylum: Nematoda
- Class: Secernentea
- Order: Tylenchida
- Family: Aphelenchoididae
- Genus: Aphelenchoides
- Species: A. fragariae

Binomial name
- Aphelenchoides fragariae (Ritzema Bos, 1891) Christie, 1932

Species of worm

Strawberry foliar nematode, or strawberry crimp nematode, is a disease caused by Aphelenchoides fragariae, a plant pathogenic nematode. It is common in strawberries and ornamental plants and can greatly affect plant yield and appearance, resulting in a loss of millions of dollars of revenue. Symptoms used to diagnose the disease are angular, water soaked lesions and necrotic blotches. Aphelenchoides fragariae is the nematode pathogen that causes the disease. Its biological cycle includes four life stages, three of which are juvenile. The nematode can undergo multiple life cycles in one growing season when favorable conditions are present. The crowns, runners, foliage, and new buds of the plant via stylet penetration or through the stomata can be infected. The best management practices for this disease are sanitation, prevention of induction of the pathogen to the environment, and planting clean seed or starter plants.

== Importance ==
Foliar nematodes are an important plant pathogen to agricultural crops and ornamental plants in the United States, Canada, and Europe. Aphelenchoides fragariae nematodes are found in over 200 plant host species, including crop species strawberry and alfalfa, and ornamental species Begonia, Chrysanthemum, Dahlia, Ficus, Hibiscus, Hosta, Viola, ferns, and Zinnia. Since 1991–1992, strawberry foliar nematode incidence numbers have been increasing in a variety of plants, but especially in strawberry and greenhouse plants such as Hosta.

There are several causes for the increasing problem of foliar nematodes in agriculture, greenhouse nurseries, and personal lawns, but there are no systemic nematicides available to growers due to the hazards they pose to people handling the plants. Advancements in plant breeding have enabled nurseries to produce more vegetative plants, which may cause infection of new plants via propagation from infected plants. Plants are also moved long distance to growers across the country and internationally, thus nematodes can easily spread to new areas where infection was previously not a problem.

Agriculturally, foliar nematode can be devastating to alfalfa and strawberry. Strawberry is a major crop in California where fruit production is valued over $523 million. Foliar nematodes reduce fruit and plant yield because they feed on the leaves, crowns, and flower buds of the strawberry plant. Ornamental plants are also a multimillion-dollar industry in the United States, and foliar nematodes destroy these plants as well. In less severe cases of nematode infection, the appearance of the plant is affected by the symptoms of disease, which gives an undesirable appearance in ornamental plants. This reduces the value of the plant and makes most infected plants unmarketable. It is difficult to quantitatively estimate the value of the amount of damage caused by nematodes because they are a persistent pathogen once they are introduced to the soil. However, in a multimillion-dollar industry, any amount of yield loss could result in loss of millions of dollars' worth of crop.

== Symptoms ==
In fields, symptomatic plants are recognized in patches or rows. They appear dwarfed, stunted, and brown in comparison to healthy plants. Local symptoms appear above ground, and plant leaves are typically distorted in shape, crinkled, and discolored with hard surfaces. They often have reduced flower size. Diseased plants typically have dead crowns and a shortened internode of the runners. A classic leaf symptom is the appearance of angular, water-soaked lesions between the veins. The angular appearance results where the lesion edge and vein meet. In leaves with parallel venation, the length of the lesion progresses parallel to the direction of the vein. As lesions enlarge and leaf damage progresses, symptomatic leaf edges become dry, dead, and crinkled. Because infected strawberry plants are less vigorous in growth, the stolon does not grow well, which results in reduced fruit size and number. If the nematodes infect early in plant development, specifically when the buds are forming, the plant morphology will be dwarfed and distorted. Once the nematodes destroy most of the leaf tissue, they leave the plant through wounds and natural openings in the leaf to find a new host to infect. The pathogen is easily transmitted through direct contact between the foliage of infected and non-infected plants. Nematodes can also move over large distances through soil transportation, as a result of human and animal movement, or through insect and bird travel.

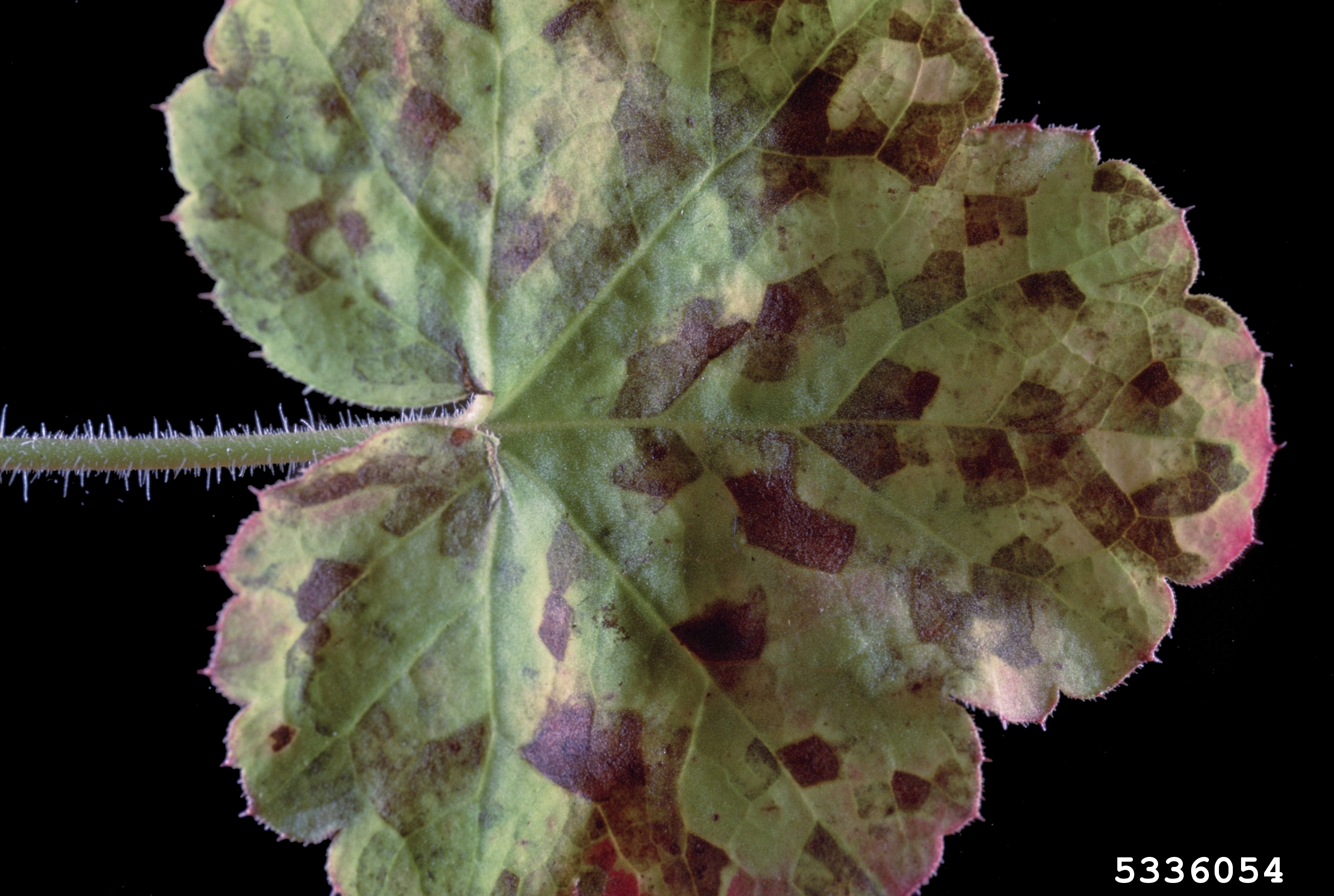
Angular lesion symptoms caused by foliar nematode

== Biology ==
After the growing season, Aphalenchoides fragariae adults and juveniles may remain in soils for up to three months, while eggs may stay dormant for years until favorable conditions arise. Overwintering only occurs in dead plant tissues, and nematodes may successfully remain dormant in temperatures as low as 2 °C. Once moist conditions return in the spring, nematodes become active and feed ectoparasitically on crowns, runners, and new buds of their host strawberry plants, only occasionally being found in leaf tissue. Nematodes reproduce sexually with females laying up to 30 eggs in ideal fertile conditions of approximately 18 °C. A typical life cycle lasts between 10 and 13 days of which juveniles undergo three molting stages. Multiple life cycles will occur in one growing season as long as conditions are favorable. However, if conditions become unfavorable, adult and juvenile nematodes may become dormant either in strawberry or nearby weed tissue until ideal conditions arise. Nematodes can be dispersed within an area through irrigation, direct contact of healthy plants with infected, or poor sanitation techniques.

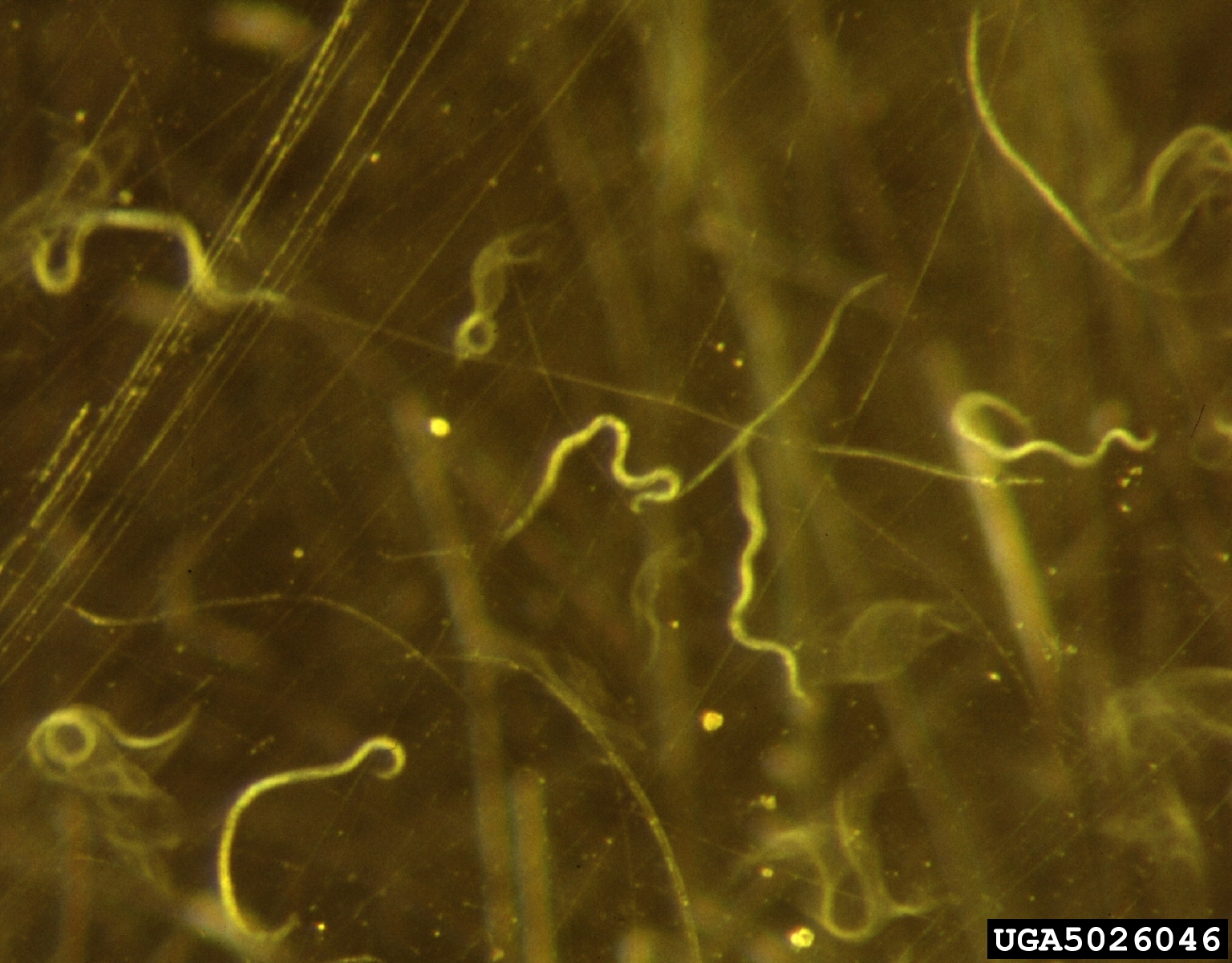
Foliar nematodes of a related species, Aphelenchoides ritzemabosi

Feeding normally occurs via stylet penetration of epidermal cells, but sometimes nematodes can enter through stomatal openings and feed from within the mesophyll cell layer. A study showed that Aphalenchoides fragariae is more attracted to CO_{2} than oxygen emissions in a controlled environment using artificial stomatal openings which expelled each gas respectively. Researchers were able to make these conclusions based on the obvious accumulation of the nematodes on and within artificial stomates expelling CO_{2}. This suggests these nematodes are able to locate stomata based on chemical sensing.

== Management ==
Strawberry foliar nematodes are difficult to manage due to their robust life cycle. While dormant, they are quite difficult to kill, and they remain viable in dry debris for more than one year. Adult nematodes can survive desiccation and lie dormant for several years. Eggs can stay dormant until survival conditions are optimal for growth. Once eggs or nematodes are present in the soil, they are nearly impossible to eradicate because they can move laterally in the soil to escape non-optimal conditions. They are found in most foliar tissue, including the leaves, stems, buds, and crowns, making it difficult to control the disease on the plant itself once it has been infected .

Many plant diseases are managed chemically, but due to a ban of nematicides there are currently no nematicides available for any type of foliar nematode. Some insecticides, pesticides, and plant product extracts from plants such as Ficus and Coffee (of which many pesticides and nematicides are neem-based) can be used to reduce the numbers of strawberry foliar nematode (a reduction of 67–85%), but none of these chemicals can completely eradicate the nematodes once they are present in the soil. These chemicals affect all stages of the life cycle because they target the nervous system. One chemical, ZeroTol, a broad-spectrum fungicide and algaecide, was shown be to 100% potent against nematodes living in a water suspension, but the study does not show how nematodes are affected in soil or outside of a laboratory environment.

An alternative method of control is a hot water treatment, which affects all stages of the life cycle and can be used on whole plants. This treatment has been used for 60 years with some effect in greenhouse plants, but not on a widespread agricultural level. The difficulty in this treatment is that exposure times to hot water and the temperature of the water must be optimized so that the nematodes are killed, but the cultivar remains undamaged. One study, which researched five California strawberry cultivars including Chandler, Douglas, Fern, Pajaro, and Selva, demonstrated that the minimum-maximum exposure times and temperatures that killed the nematodes but did not harm the cultivars were: 20–30 minutes at 44.4°C, 10–15 minutes at 46.1°C, and 8–10 minutes at 47.7°. The study also found that fruit production was more sensitive to the treatment than mere survival of the plant, so the minimum exposure times are recommended when using plants for fruit production, and the maximum time is recommended when using plants for propagation.

One of the best and most practiced forms of management to reduce the local and geographical spread of the disease is sanitation. Removing the infected leaves of the plant can reduce spread in the individual plant, but because the nematode is found in most foliar tissue the nematodes may already be present in other tissues before the leaf symptoms appear. The nematodes can also move on the outside of the plant surface when water is present, so the nematodes can move around the outside surface of the plant and infect new tissues. Therefore, once plants show any signs of infection, they should be removed and destroyed. Reducing or eliminating overhead irrigation can prevent dispersal of the nematode through water splashing, and keeping the foliage dry prevents the nematodes from moving on the outside of the plant. Plants should be placed further apart to allow water to dry quickly after irrigation. In the greenhouse or nursery, soils, containers, and tools should be sterilized on a regular basis, and the floor and storage areas should be free from plant debris.

The most important form of management is prevention of introduction of the nematode to the environment. One should avoid planting infected plants, and it is recommended that new plants (especially in a personal lawn or greenhouse) be planted in an isolated area to monitor the plant for the development of symptoms before transplanting the plant near established plants. This will prevent the established plants from getting infected from a new, infected plant. All symptomatic plants should be destroyed immediately. Dead plant material should also be handled with caution. Vermiform nematodes can survive and reproduce in compost piles of dead plant material by feeding on fungi that are commonly found in compost. As a result, infected plants should be burned and sterilized to prevent the nematodes from infecting soil (which results directly from burying the material), or other plants (from allowing the plant to remain rooted in the soil near other plants as it dies).

== Hosts ==
See:

- List of African daisy diseases
- List of African violet diseases
- List of cyclamen diseases
- List of foliage plant diseases (Polypodiaceae)
- List of geranium diseases
- List of primula diseases
- List of strawberry diseases
