= Foliar nematode =

Group of roundworms

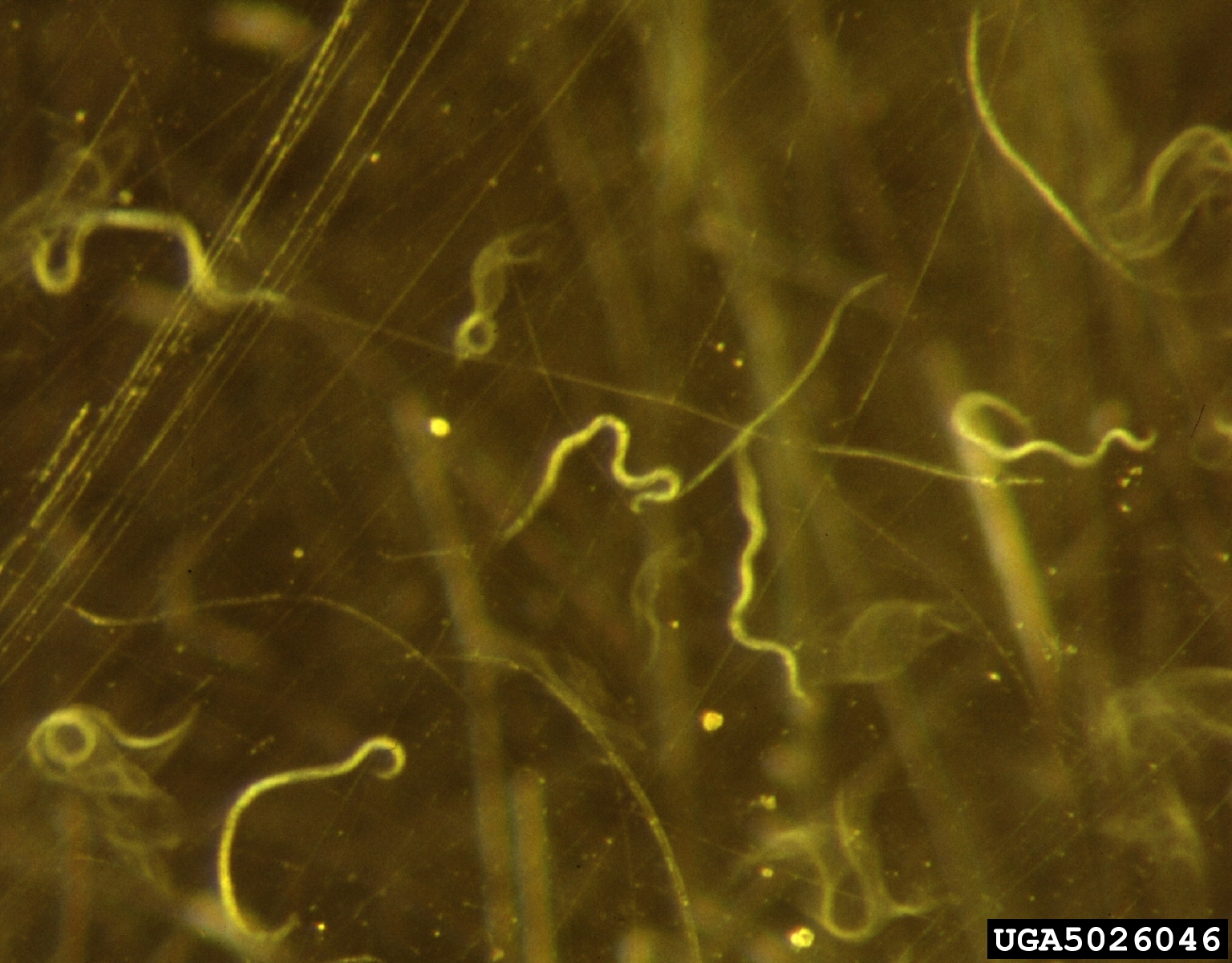
The foliar nematode Aphelenchoides ritzemabosi

Foliar nematodes are plant parasitic roundworms in the genus Aphelenchoides. The three most economically important species are Aphelenchoides fragariae, A. ritzemabosi, and A. besseyi. Foliar nematodes are becoming a widespread and serious problem for the ornamental and nursery industries. A. fragariae causes damage on hundreds of different plants including chrysanthemum, begonia, gloxinia, African violet, cyclamen, and a wide variety of bedding plants and ferns, causing brown to black, vein-delimited lesions on leaf tissue, defoliation, and possible stunting of plants.

== Biology ==
While many plant parasitic nematodes feed on plant roots, foliar nematodes live and reproduce inside the leaves of plants. The nematodes live within the epidermis and mesophyll tissues of leaves, which causes necrosis and collapse of the palisade and spongy parenchyma tissues.

Inside the leaves of plants female nematodes lay one or two eggs a day, with each female producing up to 25 to 30 eggs. The generation time from egg to adult is finished in 10–14 days, with eggs hatching in 3 to 4 days, and nematodes maturing after 6–12 days. This rapid generation time allows populations to quickly grow, sometimes reaching thousands of nematodes per leaf

Adult foliar nematodes are able to overwinter by surviving in dried plant tissue in a dormant state. The nematodes can survive in this dead leaf material for several months. Foliar nematodes do not survive for very long in bare soil alone.

== Dispersal ==
Foliar nematodes occur throughout the United States in greenhouse and nursery settings. Foliar nematodes travel in films of water, swimming up the stems of plants and entering leaf tissue through stomata. The nematodes are transmitted plant to plant by splashing, overhead irrigation, rainfall, and other forms of dripping water. They can also be transmitted through infected vegetative nursery cuttings, and can be rapidly spread in new material if symptoms are not present during the propagation of cuttings.

== Control ==
Presently, there are very few control options for plants infested with foliar nematodes. The current recommendations are to destroy infected plant material, and avoid using overhead irrigation to prevent the spread of nematodes to new plants.
