= Aphelenchoides arachidis =

Scientific classification
- Kingdom: Animalia
- Phylum: Nematoda
- Class: Secernentea
- Order: Tylenchida
- Family: Aphelenchoididae
- Genus: Aphelenchoides
- Species: A. arachidis

Binomial name
- Aphelenchoides arachidis Bos, 1977

Species of roundworm

Aphelenchoides arachidis is a plant pathogenic nematode.
