= Aphelenchoides bicaudatus =

Scientific classification
- Domain: Eukaryota
- Kingdom: Animalia
- Phylum: Nematoda
- Class: Secernentea
- Order: Tylenchida
- Family: Aphelenchoididae
- Genus: Aphelenchoides
- Species: A. bicaudatus

Binomial name
- Aphelenchoides bicaudatus Imamura, 1931

Nematode parasite

Aphelenchoides bicaudatus is a nematode parasite of Elaeidobius kamerunicus, Vigna marina, and Agaricus bisporus.

== Distribution ==
In June 1980 E. kamerunicus were imported from Cameroon to Malaysia. They were needed to pollinate Elaeis guineensis, which until then had been inadequately pollinated by whatever native insects were around. The pupae were found to be severely infested with A. bicaudatus and so were treated until nematode-free before being released.

It occurs commonly as a soil organism in New South Wales.

A. bicaudatus is also found in: Libya, China, India, and Brazil.

== Protein expression ==
A. bicaudatus may be distinguished from other Aphelenchoides and Ditylenchus angustus and D. myceliophagus by some of their α- and β-esterase banding and protein patterns - while some are common between various pairs of those taxa.
