= Aphelenchoides parietinus =

Scientific classification
- Kingdom: Animalia
- Phylum: Nematoda
- Class: Secernentea
- Order: Tylenchida
- Family: Aphelenchoididae
- Genus: Aphelenchoides
- Species: A. parietinus

Binomial name
- Aphelenchoides parietinus (Bastian, 1865)

Species of roundworm

Aphelenchoides parietinus is a plant pathogenic nematode.
