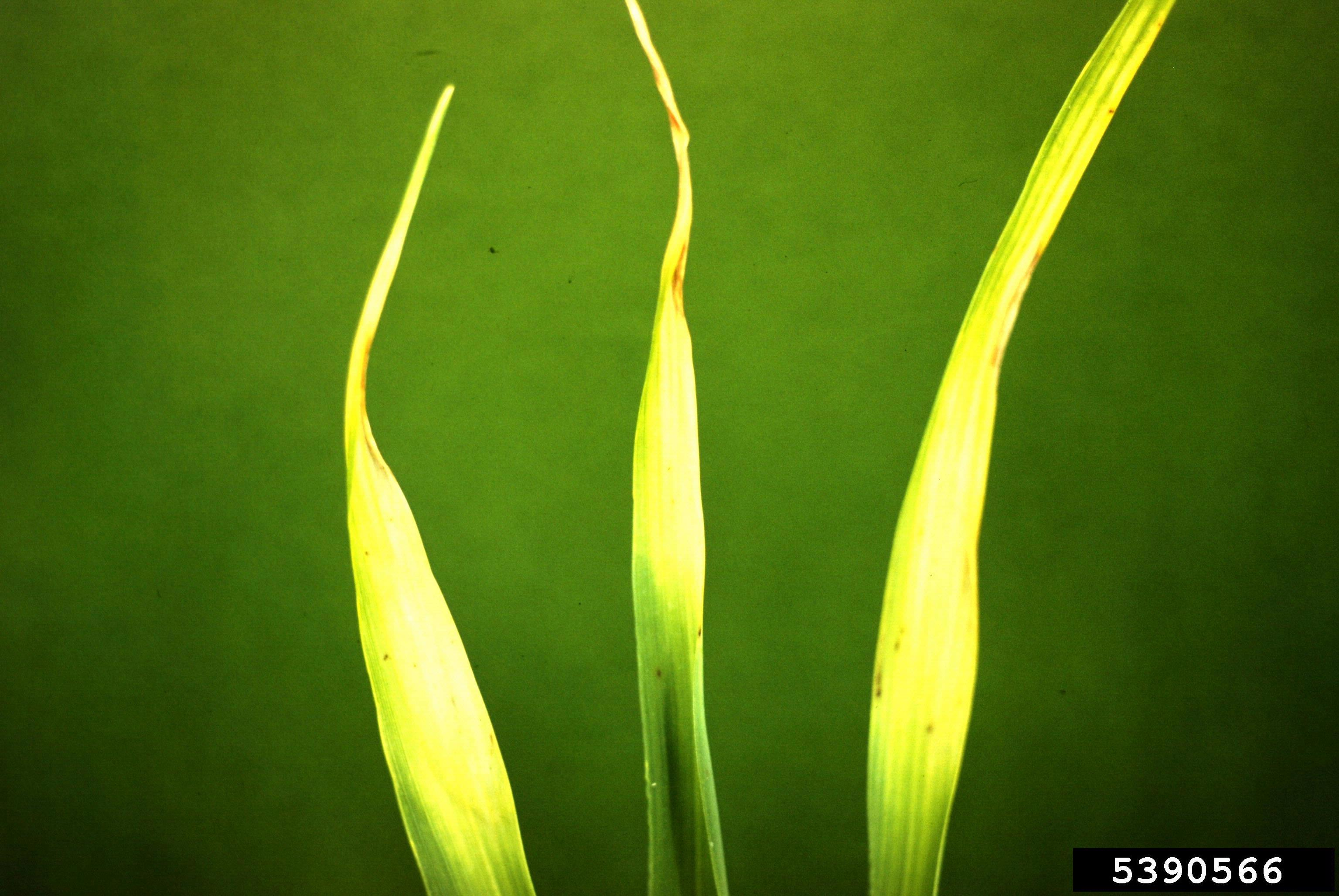

Scientific classification
- Domain: Eukaryota
- Kingdom: Animalia
- Phylum: Nematoda
- Class: Secernentea
- Order: Tylenchida
- Family: Aphelenchoididae
- Genus: Aphelenchoides
- Species: A. besseyi

Binomial name
- Aphelenchoides besseyi Christie, 1942

Synonyms
- Aphelenchoides oryzae Yokoo; Asteroaphelenchoides besseyi (Christie) Drozdovski

= Aphelenchoides besseyi =

Rice white tip nematode

Plant pathogenic nematode

Aphelenchoides besseyi is a plant pathogenic nematode. It is sometimes referred to as rice white tip, spring dwarf, strawberry bud, flying strawberry nematode or strawberry crimp disease nematode. This foliar nematode is found in Africa, North, Central, and South America, Asia, Eastern Europe, and Pacific islands.

== Morphology ==
A. besseyi has a well-developed and distinct metacorpus. The stylet is small with well-developed knobs. The tail has a mucro with three points. Males have a rose thorn spicule and no bursa.

== Life cycle ==
The nematodes survival stage is to remain anhydrobiotic in seed until planting. As surrounding plants grow the nematodes become active and feed on meristematic tissue. A. besseyi reproduces amphimicticly although parthenogenesis can take place. As the plant begins to reach reproductive maturity the number of nematodes increases dramatically. The nematodes migrate to feed on reproductive structures eventually settling in the developing rice seed. As the kernel dries the nematode slowly desiccates and can remain viable in the kernel for up to three years. The life cycle of A.besseyi is generally short consisting of around 8–12 days. This species is thermophilic. The lower threshold for development is 13 °C (55 °F) and the optimum temperature varies between 23 and 30 °C (73 and 86 °F). The sum of effective temperatures for the development of one generation is 80 degree-days.

== Host-parasite relationship ==
A. besseyi is an ectoparasitic nematode which means it feeds on the plant tissue externally. This nematode is most often associated with a disease in which the leaves of the rice plant turn white in the meristematic regions followed by necrosis. These nematodes can also cause stunting and sterility with yield losses of up to 50% reported

== Management ==
The most common management practice for A. besseyi is to maintain clean seed stocks. Since the nematode survives in the seed it is fairly easy to control. Seed can be chemically treated to kill nematodes or can be cleaned using a method in which the seed is initially soaked in cool water to activate the nematode and then briefly soaked in hot water to kill them. These seeds can then either be directly planted or quickly dried for storage.
