= Aphelenchoides coffeae =

Scientific classification
- Kingdom: Animalia
- Phylum: Nematoda
- Class: Secernentea
- Order: Tylenchida
- Family: Aphelenchoididae
- Genus: Aphelenchoides
- Species: A. coffeae

Binomial name
- Aphelenchoides coffeae (Zimmermann, 1898)

Species of roundworm

Aphelenchoides coffeae is a genus of mycetophagous nematodes. Some species are plant pathogenic foliar nematodes.
