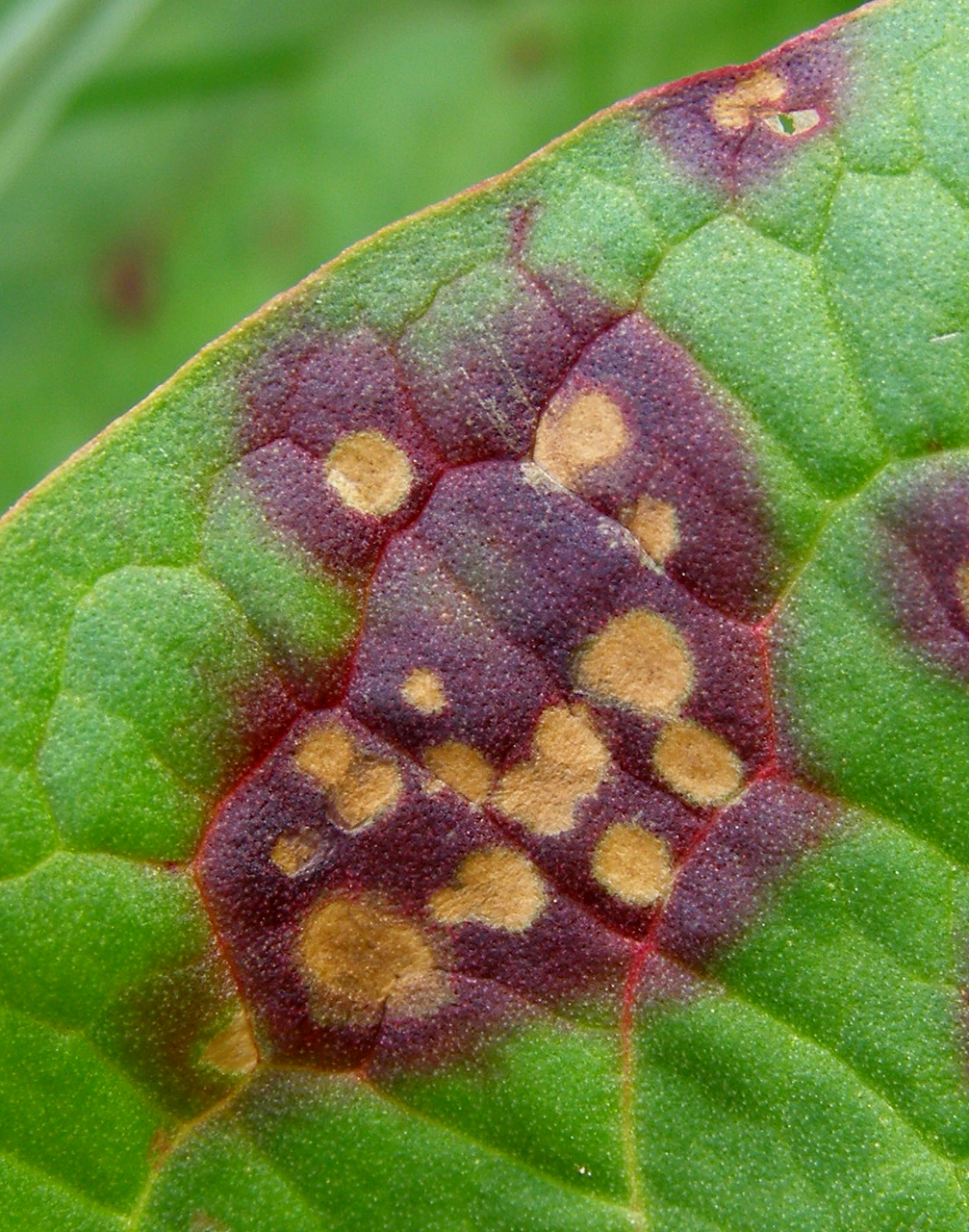
- Ramularia rubella on Rumex sp.

Scientific classification
- Domain: Eukaryota
- Kingdom: Fungi
- Division: Ascomycota
- Class: Dothideomycetes
- Order: Capnodiales
- Family: Mycosphaerellaceae
- Genus: Ramularia; Unger (1833)

Type species
- Ramularia pusilla Unger (1833)

Species
- See List of Ramularia species

= Ramularia =

Genus of fungi

Ramularia is a genus of ascomycete fungi. Its species, which are anamorphs of the genus Mycosphaerella, are plant pathogens. Economically important host species include Narcissus, sugar beet, and barley.

Ramularia species are hyphomycetes with simple morphology; other genera are frequently mistaken for Ramularia. As of 2024, almost 800 species are recognised in the genus Ramularia.

== Selected species ==
There are almost a 900 species accepted in the genus Ramularia, including:

- Ramularia beticola
- Ramularia brunnea
- Ramularia coryli
- Ramularia cyclaminicola
- Ramularia gossypii
- Ramularia grevilleana
- Ramularia macrospora
- Ramularia menthicola
- Ramularia necator
- Ramularia primulae
- Ramularia rubella
- Ramularia spinaciae
- Ramularia subtilis
- Ramularia tenella
- Ramularia ulmariae
- Ramularia vallisumbrosae
