= Tylaphelenchus =

Scientific classification
- Domain: Eukaryota
- Kingdom: Animalia
- Phylum: Nematoda
- Class: Secernentea
- Order: Aphelenchida
- Family: Aphelenchidae
- Genus: Tylaphelenchus; Rühm, 1956

Genus of roundworms

Tylaphelenchus is a genus of nematodes belonging to the family Aphelenchidae.

Species:

- Tylaphelenchus ipidicola
- Tylaphelenchus leichenicola
