= Aphelenchus =

Scientific classification
- Domain: Eukaryota
- Kingdom: Animalia
- Phylum: Nematoda
- Class: Secernentea
- Order: Tylenchida
- Family: Aphelenchoididae
- Subfamily: Aphelenchoidinae
- Genus: Aphelenchus

Species
- See text

Genus of roundworms

Aphelenchus is a genus of nematode in the family Aphelenchoididae. Member species inhabit soil and feed on fungi.

== Species ==
Aphelenchus contains the following known species:

- A. assamensis Chanu, Meitei, and Shah, 2016
- A. avenae Bastian, 1865
- A. hainanensis Rahm, 1938
- A. kongoensis Allgén, 1933
- A. maximus Das, 1960
- A. mirzai Das, 1960

In a study published in 1968, M.S. Jairajpuri argued that A. mirzai and A. maximus were synonyms of A. avenae. They are included on the Integrated Taxonomic Information System database as valid species names, but not listed on the World Register of Marine Species. A study by Chanu, Meitei, and Shah published in 2016 states Aphelenchus contains "about 30 nominal species", but states that they are difficult to reliably identify due to poor characterization.
