= Paraphelenchus =

Scientific classification
- Domain: Eukaryota
- Kingdom: Animalia
- Phylum: Nematoda
- Class: Secernentea
- Order: Aphelenchida
- Family: Aphelenchidae
- Genus: Paraphelenchus; Micoletzky, 1922

Genus of roundworms

Paraphelenchus is a genus of nematodes belonging to the family Aphelenchidae.

The species of this genus are found in Europe and Africa.

Species:

- Paraphelenchus amblyurus Steiner, 1934
- Paraphelenchus batavicus Filipjev, 1934
- Paraphelenchus myceliophthorus Goodey, 1958
- Paraphelenchus pseudoparietinus (Micoletzky, 1922) Micoletzky, 1925
- Paraphelenchus tritici Baranovskaya, 1958
- Paraphelenchus zichii Andrássy, 1989
