= Schistonchus =

Scientific classification
- Kingdom: Animalia
- Phylum: Nematoda
- Class: Chromadorea
- Order: Rhabditida
- Family: Aphelenchoididae
- Subfamily: Aphelenchoidinae
- Genus: Schistonchus; Cobb, 1927

Species
- Schistonchus aureus; Schistonchus caprifici; Schistonchus laevigatus

Genus of nematodes

Schistonchus is a genus of plant-parasitic nematodes in the family Aphelenchoididae.

Schistonchus laevigatus and Schistonchus aureus are plant-parasitic nematodes associated with the pollinator Pegoscapus assuetus and Pegoscapus mexicanus respectively and syconia of Ficus citrifolia and Ficus aurea respectively.

Schistonchus caprifici is a nematode associated with the fig pollinator Blastophaga psenes, and its cleptoparasite Philotrypesis caricae.

Schistonchus macrophylla and Schistonchus altermacrophylla are associated with the pollinator Pleistodontes froggatti of Ficus macrophylla.
