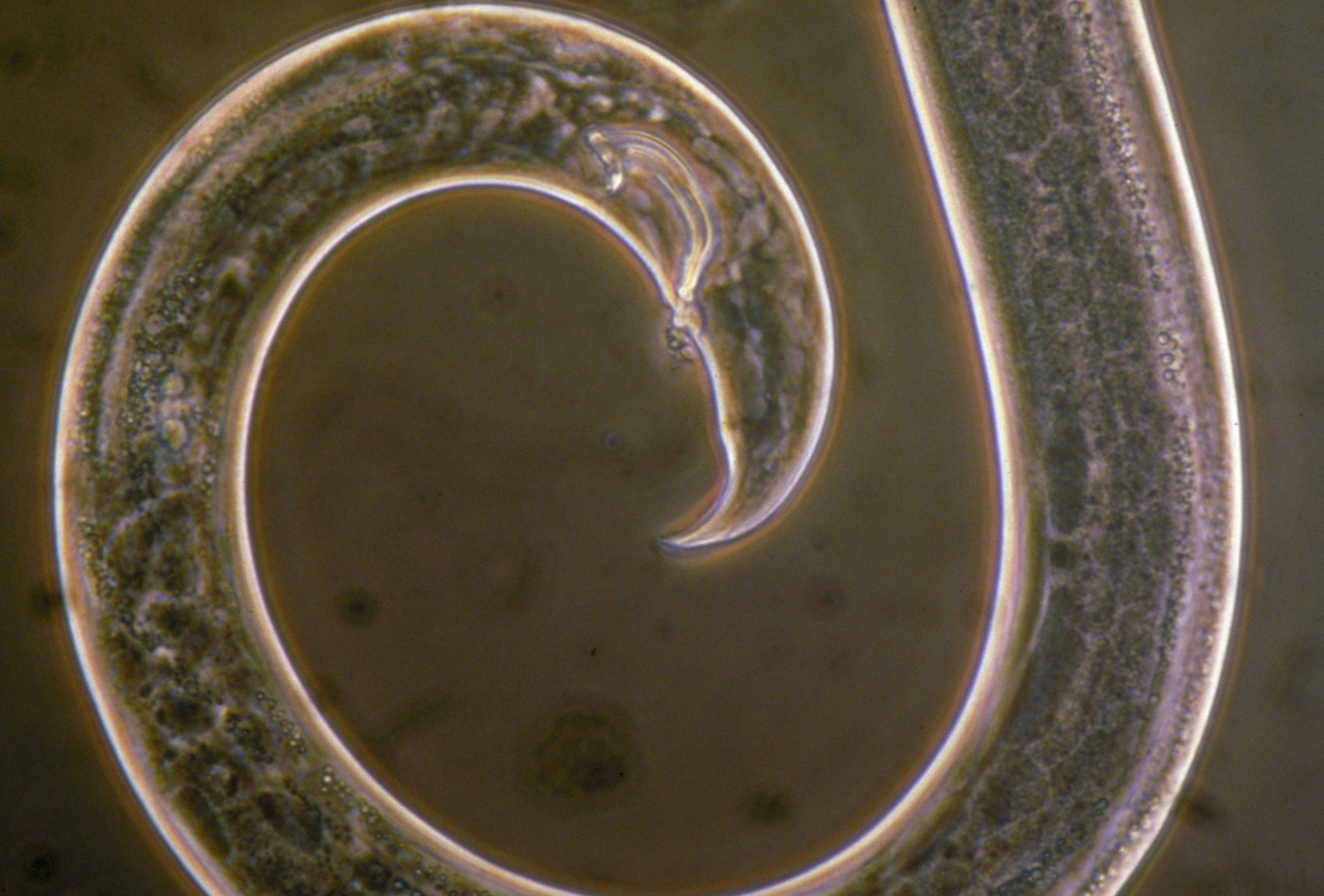
- Bursaphelenchus xylophilus

Scientific classification
- Domain: Eukaryota
- Kingdom: Animalia
- Phylum: Nematoda
- Class: Secernentea
- Order: Aphelenchida
- Family: Parasitaphelenchidae
- Genus: Bursaphelenchus; Fuchs, 1937

Species
- About 70-90, see text

= Bursaphelenchus =

Genus of roundworms

Bursaphelenchus is a genus of nematodes (roundworms) in the order Aphelenchida. Most are obligate mycophages, but some feed on wood, with two species, the red ring nematode (B. cocophilus) and the pine wood nematode (B. xylophilus), economically significant as pests of coconut palms and of pine trees, respectively. Given that Bursaphelenchus species are usually hard to distinguish from one another except by trained nematologists with access to microscopes or DNA sequence analysis, the entire genus is put under quarantine in some countries. Where this is not the case however, these nematodes are becoming established as model organisms for nematode developmental biology, ecology and genetics.

As of 2009, there are about 70 to 90 species in the genus. New taxa are described frequently.

== Ecology ==
Bursaphelenchus contains a single described hermaphroditic species, okinawaensis, and over 100 described gonochoristic species. They inhabit soil or decaying wood, feeding on the wood itself or fungal hyphae growing in it, such as those of grey mould (Botrytis cinerea). They are sometimes beneficial when they reduce the fungal load inside the wood, but when they consume the plant tissue they are known to cause the death of living trees.

These nematodes are phoretic, dispersed between trees when their dauer larvae are transported by insects. Species involved include bark beetles, weevils, flat-faced longhorn beetles such as sawyer beetles, and soil-nesting bees. The process of dauer larva formation is not well understood, but it is of research interest because it is significant in the epidemics of plant diseases caused by these nematodes, such as pine wilt.

== Selected species ==
Bursaphelenchus includes:

- Bursaphelenchus abietinus Braasch & Schmutzenhofer, 2000
- Bursaphelenchus abruptus
- Bursaphelenchus africanus Braasch, et al., 2007
- Bursaphelenchus anatolius
- Bursaphelenchus antoniae
- Bursaphelenchus arthuri
- Bursaphelenchus borealis
- Bursaphelenchus chitwoodi
- Bursaphelenchus clavicauda
- Bursaphelenchus cocophilus – red ring nematode
- Bursaphelenchus conicaudatus
- Bursaphelenchus doui
- Bursaphelenchus eggersi
- Bursaphelenchus eremus
- Bursaphelenchus fraudulentus
- Bursaphelenchus fungivorus Franklin & Hooper, 1962
- Bursaphelenchus gerberae
- Bursaphelenchus hellenicus Skarmoutsos, Braasch & Michalopoulou, 1998
- Bursaphelenchus hildegardae
- Bursaphelenchus hofmanni Braasch, 1998
- Bursaphelenchus hunti
- Bursaphelenchus hylobianum
- Bursaphelenchus kevini
- Bursaphelenchus mucronatus
- Bursaphelenchus okinawaensis Kanzaki, et al., 2008
- Bursaphelenchus paracorneolus
- Bursaphelenchus parvispicularis
- Bursaphelenchus pinasteri
- Bursaphelenchus piniperdae Fuchs, 1937
- Bursaphelenchus platzeri
- Bursaphelenchus poligraphi
- Bursaphelenchus rainulfi
- Bursaphelenchus sachsi
- Bursaphelenchus seani Giblin & Kaya, 1983
- Bursaphelenchus sexdentati Rühm, 1960
- Bursaphelenchus sinensis
- Bursaphelenchus singaporensis
- Bursaphelenchus thailandae
- Bursaphelenchus tusciae
- Bursaphelenchus vallesianus
- Bursaphelenchus xylophilus – pine wood nematode, pine wilt nematode
- Bursaphelenchus yongensis
