= Aphelenchus avenae =

Scientific classification
- Domain: Eukaryota
- Kingdom: Animalia
- Phylum: Nematoda
- Class: Secernentea
- Order: Tylenchida
- Family: Aphelenchoididae
- Genus: Aphelenchus
- Species: A. avenae

Binomial name
- Aphelenchus avenae Bastian, 1865

Species of roundworm

Aphelenchus avenae is a mycophagous nematode capable of feeding on plant tissue in culture.
