= Paraphelenchidae =

Scientific classification
- Domain: Eukaryota
- Kingdom: Animalia
- Phylum: Nematoda
- Class: Secernentea
- Order: Aphelenchida
- Family: Paraphelenchidae

Family of nematodes

Paraphelenchidae is a family of nematodes belonging to the order Aphelenchida.

Genera:

- Metaphelenchus Steiner, 1944
- Paraphelenchus Micoletzky, 1922
