= Ramularia subtilis =

Scientific classification
- Domain: Eukaryota
- Kingdom: Fungi
- Division: Ascomycota
- Class: Dothideomycetes
- Order: Capnodiales
- Family: Mycosphaerellaceae
- Genus: Ramularia
- Species: R. subtilis

Binomial name
- Ramularia subtilis Braun, Hill & Schubert, 2006

Species of fungus

Ramularia subtilis is a fungus.
