= Ramularia necator =

Scientific classification
- Domain: Eukaryota
- Kingdom: Fungi
- Division: Ascomycota
- Class: Dothideomycetes
- Order: Capnodiales
- Family: Mycosphaerellaceae
- Genus: Ramularia
- Species: R. necator

Binomial name
- Ramularia necator Massee

Species of fungus

Ramularia necator is a fungal plant pathogen infecting coconut palms.
