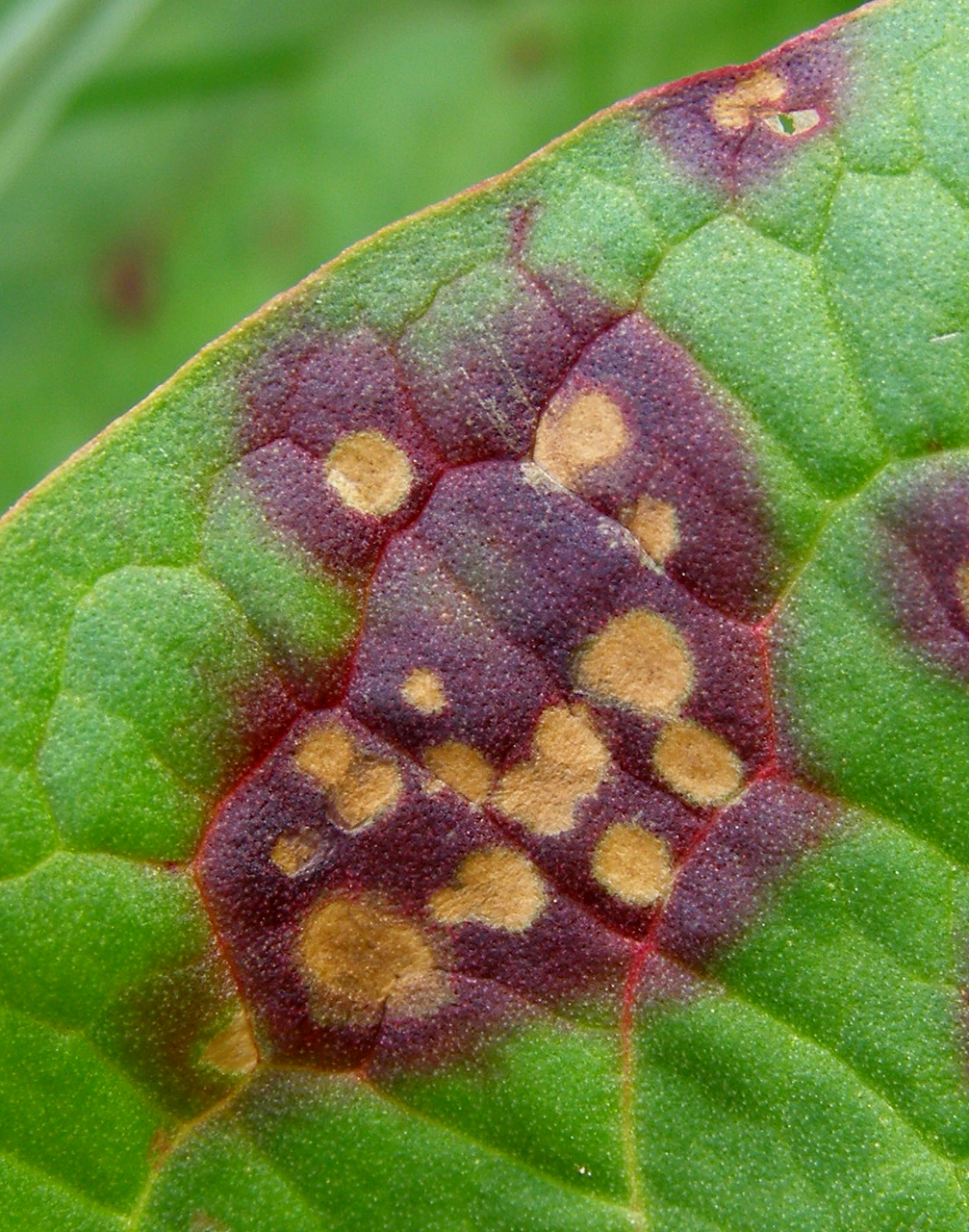
- Ramularia rubella on a Rumex leaf

Scientific classification
- Kingdom: Fungi
- Division: Ascomycota
- Class: Dothideomycetes
- Order: Mycosphaerellales
- Family: Mycosphaerellaceae
- Genus: Ramularia
- Species: R. rubella

Binomial name
- Ramularia rubella (Bonord.) Nannf.

= Ramularia rubella =

Species of fungus

Ramularia rubella is a plant pathogen in Ascomycota that infects Rumex species. Infection produces reddish spots on leaves. The red color is caused by the production of rubellin, a photodynamic anthraquinone-derived phytotoxin. R. rubella was originally described from Rumex aquaticus in Germany; it has a wide geographic range on Rumex species. It is being investigated as a biological control agent of Rumex obtusifolius.
