= Ramularia vallisumbrosae =

Scientific classification
- Domain: Eukaryota
- Kingdom: Fungi
- Division: Ascomycota
- Class: Dothideomycetes
- Order: Capnodiales
- Family: Mycosphaerellaceae
- Genus: Ramularia
- Species: R. vallisumbrosae

Binomial name
- Ramularia vallisumbrosae Cavara 1899

Synonyms
- Phyllosticta narcissicola; Ramularia narcissi

Species of fungus

Ramularia vallisumbrosae is a fungal plant pathogen infecting daffodils (Narcissus), causing narcissus white mould disease.

== Bibliography ==
- Gregory, P.H. "The life history of Ramularia vallisumbrosae Cav. on Narcissus". Transactions of the British Mycological Society. 23 (1): 24–IN1. doi:10.1016/s0007-1536(39)80013-4.
