= Aphelenchidae =

Scientific classification
- Kingdom: Animalia
- Phylum: Nematoda
- Class: Secernentea
- Order: Aphelenchida
- Family: Aphelenchidae

Family of roundworms

Aphelenchidae is a family of nematodes belonging to the order Aphelenchida.

== Genera ==
Genera:

- Aphelenchus Bastian, 1865
- Bursaphelenchus Fuchs, 1937
- Cryptophelenchus
