= Ramularia beticola =

Scientific classification
- Domain: Eukaryota
- Kingdom: Fungi
- Division: Ascomycota
- Class: Dothideomycetes
- Order: Capnodiales
- Family: Mycosphaerellaceae
- Genus: Ramularia
- Species: R. beticola

Binomial name
- Ramularia beticola Fautrey & F. Lamb., (1897)

Species of fungus

Ramularia beticola is a fungal plant pathogen infecting beets.
