= Cryptocline cyclaminis =

Scientific classification
- Kingdom: Fungi
- Division: Ascomycota
- Class: Dothideomycetes
- Order: Helotiales
- Family: incertae sedis
- Genus: Cryptocline
- Species: C. cyclaminis

Binomial name
- Cryptocline cyclaminis (Sibilia) Arx, (1963)

Synonyms
- Gloeosporium cyclaminis Sibilia, (1922)

Species of fungus

Cryptocline cyclaminis is a plant pathogen.
