= Ramularia menthicola =

Scientific classification
- Domain: Eukaryota
- Kingdom: Fungi
- Division: Ascomycota
- Class: Dothideomycetes
- Order: Capnodiales
- Family: Mycosphaerellaceae
- Genus: Ramularia
- Species: R. menthicola

Binomial name
- Ramularia menthicola Sacc. (1886)

Synonyms
- Ramularia menthae Sacc. (1881)

Species of fungus

Ramularia menthicola is a species of fungus in the family Mycosphaerellaceae. It is a plant pathogen that infects mint. It was formally described as a new species by the Italian mycologist Pier Andrea Saccardo in 1886. In his 1998 monograph on phytopathogenic Hyphomycetes, Uwe Braun suggests that Ramularia menthae should be considered a synonym to Ramularia lamii, but the name remains in use in the scientific literature, and is accepted as a valid species by Index Fungorum.

Some locations from which the fungus has been recorded include Malta, the Nantes region of France, and the Yüksekova basin in Turkey growing on Mentha longifolia.
