= Ramularia spinaciae =

Scientific classification
- Domain: Eukaryota
- Kingdom: Fungi
- Division: Ascomycota
- Class: Dothideomycetes
- Order: Capnodiales
- Family: Mycosphaerellaceae
- Genus: Ramularia
- Species: R. spinaciae

Binomial name
- Ramularia spinaciae Nypels

Species of fungus

Ramularia spinaciae is a fungal plant pathogen in the species Mycosphaerellaceae infecting spinach.
