= Laimaphelenchus =

Scientific classification
- Domain: Eukaryota
- Kingdom: Animalia
- Phylum: Nematoda
- Class: Secernentea
- Order: Tylenchida
- Family: Aphelenchoididae
- Genus: Laimaphelenchus; Fuchs, 1937

Genus of roundworms

Laimaphelenchus is a genus of nematodes belonging to the family Aphelenchoididae.

The genus has almost cosmopolitan distribution.

Species:

- Laimaphelenchus australis
- Laimaphelenchus heidelbergi
- Laimaphelenchus hyrcanus
- Laimaphelenchus lignophilus
- Laimaphelenchus moro
- Laimaphelenchus pannocaudus Massey, 1966
- Laimaphelenchus penardi (Steiner, 1914)
- Laimaphelenchus persicus
- Laimaphelenchus pini Baujard, 1981
- Laimaphelenchus suberensis
- Laimaphelenchus ulmi
