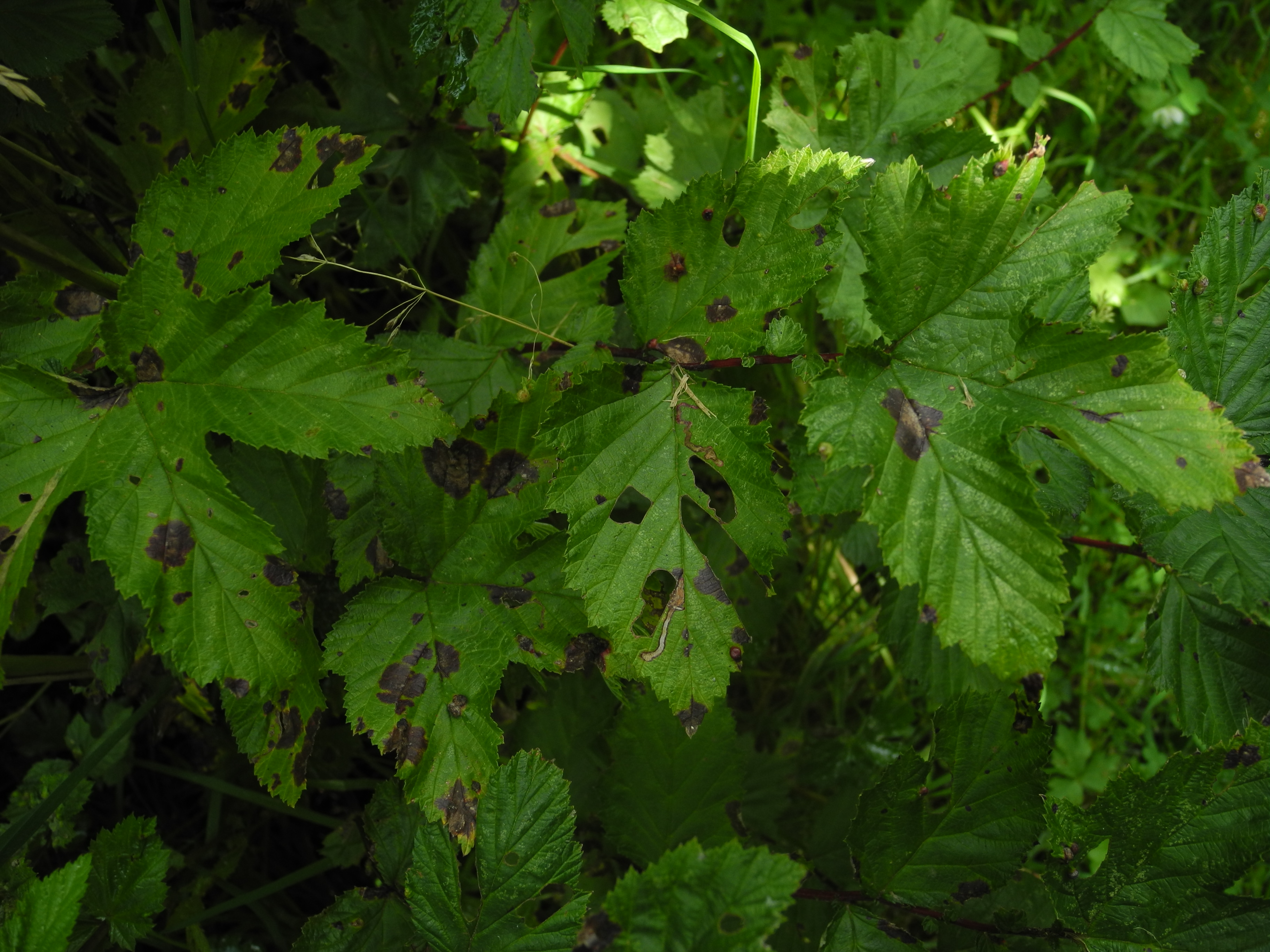
- Purple spots caused by the fungus Ramularia ulmariae on leaves of meadowsweet (Filipendula ulmaria)

Scientific classification
- Kingdom: Fungi
- Division: Ascomycota
- Class: Dothideomycetes
- Order: Mycosphaerellales
- Family: Mycosphaerellaceae
- Genus: Ramularia
- Species: R. ulmariae

Binomial name
- Ramularia ulmariae Cooke 1876

Synonyms
- Cylindrosporium ulmariae (Cooke) J. Schröt. 1897

= Ramularia ulmariae =

Species of fungus

Ramularia ulmariae is a fungal species described by Cooke in 1876. Ramularia ulmariae belongs to the genus Ramularia and the family Mycosphaerellaceae. No subspecies are listed in the Catalogue of Life.

This fungus is a pathogen of meadowsweet (Filipendula ulmaria) that causes purple spots on the plant's leaves and is most evident in summer. It produces translucent, cylindrical conidia with up to two septa.

Ramularia ulmariae has been reported from Europe and also the western coast of North America. However its presence is probably under-recorded.
