= Pelargonium line pattern virus =

Virus classification
- (unranked): Virus
- Realm: Riboviria
- Kingdom: Orthornavirae
- Phylum: Kitrinoviricota
- Class: Tolucaviricetes
- Order: Tolivirales
- Family: Tombusviridae
- Genus: Pelarspovirus
- Species: Pelargonium line pattern virus

Synonyms
- Pelargonium ring pattern virus

Species of virus

Pelargonium line pattern virus (PLPV) is a plant pathogenic virus of the family Tombusviridae.
