= Ramularia coryli =

Scientific classification
- Domain: Eukaryota
- Kingdom: Fungi
- Division: Ascomycota
- Class: Dothideomycetes
- Order: Capnodiales
- Family: Mycosphaerellaceae
- Genus: Ramularia
- Species: R. coryli

Binomial name
- Ramularia coryli Chevassut, (1998)

Species of fungus

Ramularia coryli is a fungal plant pathogen infecting hazelnuts.
