= Pseudomonas asplenii =

Scientific classification
- Domain: Bacteria
- Kingdom: Pseudomonadati
- Phylum: Pseudomonadota
- Class: Gammaproteobacteria
- Order: Pseudomonadales
- Family: Pseudomonadaceae
- Genus: Pseudomonas
- Species: P. asplenii

Binomial name
- Pseudomonas asplenii (Ark and Tompkins 1946); Săvulescu 1947

Type strain
- ATCC 23835 CCUG 32773; CFBP 3279; CIP 106710; DSM 17133; ICMP 3944; LMG 2137; NCPPB 1947

Synonyms
- Phytomonas asplenii Ark and Tompkins 1946

Species of bacterium

Pseudomonas asplenii is a Gram-negative soil bacterium that causes bacterial leaf blight of the bird's-nest fern (Asplenium nidus), from which it derives its name.
