= Sheraphelenchus =

Scientific classification
- Domain: Eukaryota
- Kingdom: Animalia
- Phylum: Nematoda
- Class: Secernentea
- Order: Tylenchida
- Family: Aphelenchoididae
- Genus: Sheraphelenchus; Nickle, 1970

Genus of roundworms

Sheraphelenchus is a genus of nematodes belonging to the family Aphelenchoididae.

The species of this genus are found in Japan.

Species:

- Sheraphelenchus breviguloris (Massey & Hinds, 1970)
- Sheraphelenchus entomophagus Nickle, 1970
