= Ramularia tenella =

Scientific classification
- Domain: Eukaryota
- Kingdom: Fungi
- Division: Ascomycota
- Class: Dothideomycetes
- Order: Capnodiales
- Family: Mycosphaerellaceae
- Genus: Ramularia
- Species: R. tenella

Binomial name
- Ramularia tenella Braun, Hill & Schubert, 2006

Species of fungus

Ramularia tenella is a fungus.
