= Ramularia macrospora =

Scientific classification
- Domain: Eukaryota
- Kingdom: Fungi
- Division: Ascomycota
- Class: Dothideomycetes
- Order: Capnodiales
- Family: Mycosphaerellaceae
- Genus: Ramularia
- Species: R. macrospora

Binomial name
- Ramularia macrospora Fresen. (1863)

Species of fungus

Ramularia macrospora is a fungal plant pathogen infecting bellflowers.
