= Parasitaphelenchidae =

Scientific classification
- Domain: Eukaryota
- Kingdom: Animalia
- Phylum: Nematoda
- Class: Secernentea
- Order: Aphelenchida
- Family: Parasitaphelenchidae

Family of worms

Parasitaphelenchidae is a family of nematodes belonging to the order Aphelenchida.

Genera:

- Bursaphelenchus
- Parasitaphelenchus
