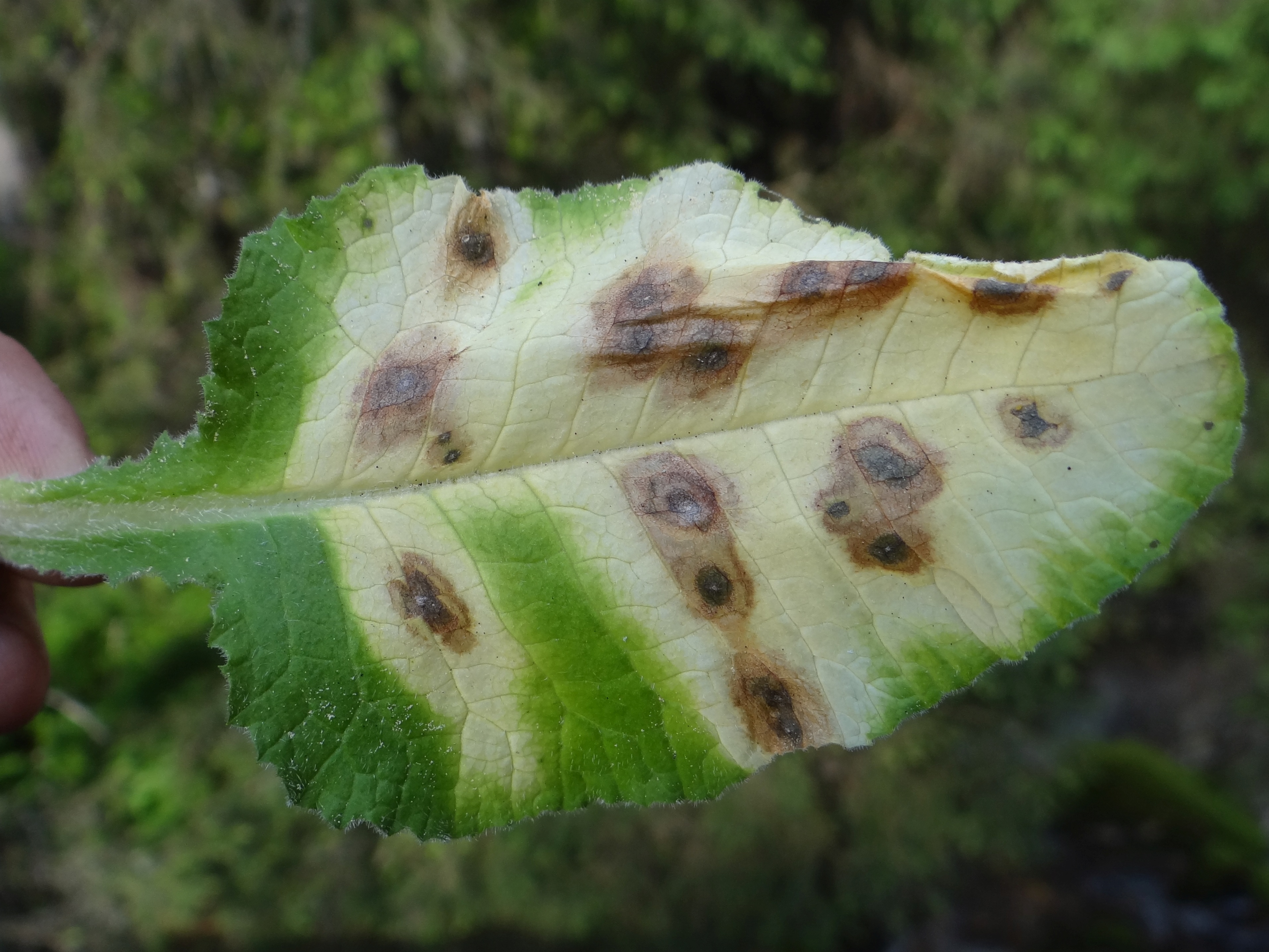

Scientific classification
- Domain: Eukaryota
- Kingdom: Fungi
- Division: Ascomycota
- Class: Dothideomycetes
- Order: Capnodiales
- Family: Mycosphaerellaceae
- Genus: Ramularia
- Species: R. primulae

Binomial name
- Ramularia primulae Thüm. (1878)

= Ramularia primulae =

Species of fungus

Ramularia primulae is a fungal plant pathogen infecting Primula. Its primary host is Primula veris.
