= Pelargonium vein clearing virus =

Pelargonium vein clearing virus (PVCV)

Virus classification
- Group: Group V ((−)ssRNA)
- Family: Rhabdoviridae
- Genus: Cytorhabdovirus
- Species: Pelargonium vein clearing virus

Synonyms
- PelVCV

Plant pathogenic virus

Pelargonium vein clearing virus (PVCV) is a plant pathogenic virus of the family Rhabdoviridae.
