= Aphelenchoides =

Scientific classification
- Kingdom: Animalia
- Phylum: Nematoda
- Class: Secernentea
- Order: Tylenchida
- Family: Aphelenchoididae
- Subfamily: Aphelenchoidinae
- Genus: Aphelenchoides; Fischer, 1894

Species
- as of 2015 138 species, including: Aphelenchoides arachidis; Aphelenchoides besseyi; Aphelenchoides bicaudatus; Aphelenchoides coffeae; Aphelenchoides composticola; Aphelenchoides fragariae; Aphelenchoides parietinus; Aphelenchoides ritzemabosi; Aphelenchoides saprophilus; Aphelenchoides subtenuis; ......

Genus of nematode worms

Aphelenchoides is a genus of mycetophagous nematodes. Some species are plant pathogenic foliar nematodes.

== Taxonomy ==
In 1961 Sanwal listed 33 species and provided a key.

The most important species of these are Aphelenchoides ritzemabosi, the chrysanthemum foliar nematode; Aphelenchoides fragariae, the spring crimp or spring dwarf nematode of strawberry, which also attacks many ornamentals; and Aphelenchoides besseyi, causing summer crimp or dwarf of strawberry and white tip of rice.

Several species of this genus feed ectoparasitically and endoparasitically on aboveground plant parts.

== Bibliography ==
- George Agrios (2005): Plant Pathology, Fifth Edition. Elsevier Academic Press
