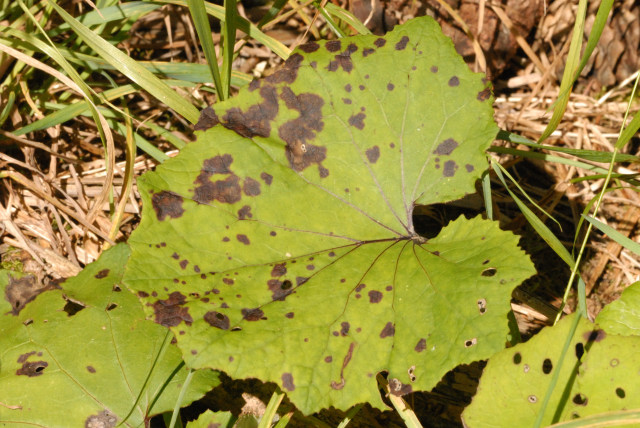
- Ramularia brunnea

Scientific classification
- Kingdom: Fungi
- Division: Ascomycota
- Class: Dothideomycetes
- Order: Capnodiales
- Family: Mycosphaerellaceae
- Genus: Ramularia
- Species: R. brunnea

Binomial name
- Ramularia brunnea Peck (1878)

= Ramularia brunnea =

Species of fungus

Ramularia brunnea is a fungal plant pathogen infecting coltsfoot. It was first described scientifically by American mycologist Charles Horton Peck.
