= Myenchildae =

Scientific classification
- Domain: Eukaryota
- Kingdom: Animalia
- Phylum: Nematoda
- Class: Secernentea
- Order: Aphelenchida
- Family: Myenchildae

Family of roundworms

Myenchildae is a family of nematodes belonging to the order Aphelenchida.

Genera:

- Myenchus
- Myoryctes
