= Spermospora avenae =

Scientific classification
- Kingdom: Fungi
- Division: Ascomycota
- Subdivision: Pezizomycotina
- Genus: Spermospora
- Species: S. avenae

Binomial name
- Spermospora avenae (Sprague & Johnson) Sprague

Species of fungus

Spermospora avenae or red leather leaf is a fungal plant pathogen of Avena sativa.

The slender colourless hyphae that colonise oat plants become broader in the leaf epidermis and develop a layer of swollen, irregular shaped cells from which conidiophores arise. These penetrate to the exterior and a single conidium forms, ready for dispersal. The colourless conidia are substantially longer than they are wide, crescent shaped and have two or three septa.

The disease symptoms on the plant leaves are initially small blue and reddish discolorations that then become larger and extend along the length of the leaf blade. The affected areas are irregular in shape. These eventually darken to red-brown and become leathery in appearance.

Wet weather is conducive to infections. The spores can survive on seeds and stubble. Foliar fungicide application has been found helpful, although is not sufficient by itself.
