= Ramularia cyclaminicola =

Scientific classification
- Domain: Eukaryota
- Kingdom: Fungi
- Division: Ascomycota
- Class: Dothideomycetes
- Order: Capnodiales
- Family: Mycosphaerellaceae
- Genus: Ramularia
- Species: R. cyclaminicola

Binomial name
- Ramularia cyclaminicola Trel. (1916)

Species of fungus

Ramularia cyclaminicola is a species of fungus in the family Mycosphaerellaceae. It is a plant pathogen that infects cyclamens.
