= Aphelenchida =

Scientific classification
- Domain: Eukaryota
- Kingdom: Animalia
- Phylum: Nematoda
- Class: Secernentea
- Subclass: Tylenchia
- Order: Aphelenchida; Siddiqi, 1980

Families
- Aphelenchidae; Aphelenchoididae; Myenchildae; Paraphelenchidae

Order of roundworms

Aphelenchida is a moderately large order of nematodes. Aphelenchida have a stylet for feeding and a very prominent median bulb in the oesophagus. They are cosmopolitan. Some are associated with insects, and may be ectoparasites or endoparasites, or merely use the insect as transport. Others are associated with plants, as root, stem, or leaf parasites, which may be pathogenic to the plant or not. Still others are associated with fungi, and some are free-living. There may be considerable plasticity of feeding habits within species, involving almost any combination of the categories listed above. Sometimes different feeding habits involve morphologically distinct phases, but they may involve only behavioral differences, and sometimes depend only on the immediate availability of different foods. Some life cycles involve a definite progression of particular hosts and depend on the life cycle of the host. Fungal feeders may have life cycles as short as 5 days.

This order includes:

- Aphelenchidae
- Aphelenchoididae
- Myenchildae
- Paraphelenchidae
