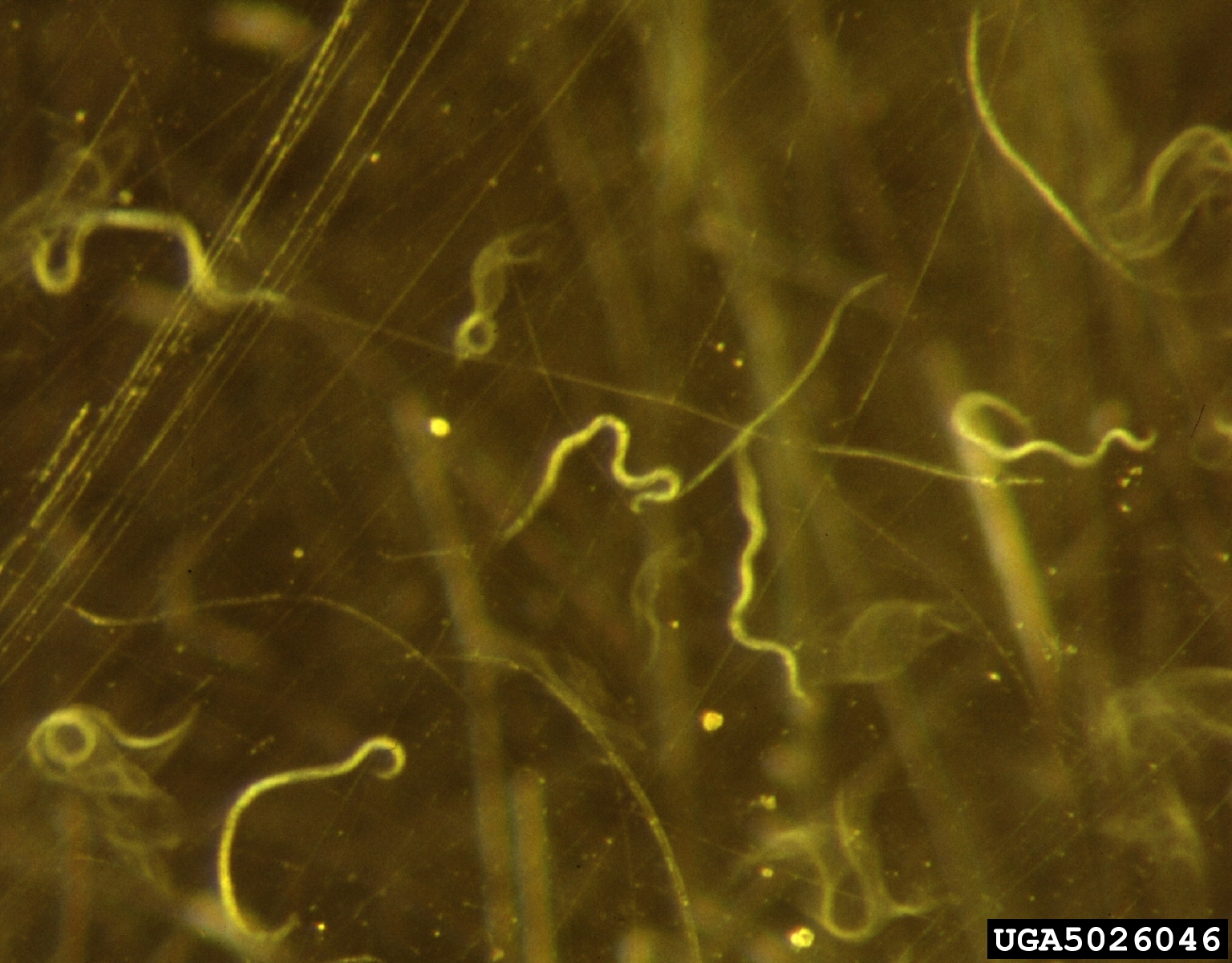
- Aphelenchoididae

Scientific classification
- Domain: Eukaryota
- Kingdom: Animalia
- Phylum: Nematoda
- Class: Secernentea
- Order: Tylenchida
- Infraorder: Tylenchomorpha
- Superfamily: Aphelenchoididea
- Family: Aphelenchoididae; Skarbilovich, 1947

Subfamilies
- Anomyctinae; Aphelenchoidinae

= Aphelenchoididae =

Family of nematodes

Aphelenchoididae is a nematode family in the order Aphelenchida.

== List of genera ==
Subfamily Anomyctinae

- Genus Anomyctus

Subfamily Aphelenchoidinae

- Genus Aphelenchoides
- Genus Ficophagus
- Genus Laimaphelenchus
- Genus Martininema
- Genus Robustodorus
- Genus Punchaulus
- Genus Ruehmaphelenchus
- Genus Schistonchus
- Genus Sheraphelenchus
- Genus Tylaphelenchus

Incertae sedis:

- Genus Pseudaphelenchus
- Genus Ptychaphelenchus
