= Lists of plant diseases =

Articles Listicles of plant disease

This is a list of articles that are lists of plant diseases.

== A ==
- List of foliage plant diseases (Acanthaceae)
- List of African daisy diseases
- List of African violet diseases
- List of foliage plant diseases (Agavaceae)
- List of alfalfa diseases
- List of almond diseases
- List of anemone diseases
- List of apple diseases
- List of apricot diseases
- List of foliage plant diseases (Araceae)
- List of foliage plant diseases (Arecaceae)
- List of foliage plant diseases (Araliaceae)
- List of foliage plant diseases (Araucariaceae)
- List of foliage plant diseases (Asclepiadaceae)
- List of asparagus diseases
- List of avocado diseases
- List of azalea diseases

Back to top

== B ==
- List of banana and plantain diseases
- List of barley diseases
- List of beet diseases
- List of bellflower diseases
- List of foliage plant diseases (Bignoniaceae)
- List of black walnut diseases
- List of bleeding heart diseases
- List of foliage plant diseases (Bromeliaceae)
- List of butterfly flower diseases

Back to top

== C ==
- List of cacao diseases
- List of foliage plant diseases (Cactaceae)
- List of caneberries diseases
- List of canola diseases
- List of carnation diseases
- List of carrot diseases
- List of cassava diseases
- List of cattleya diseases
- List of chickpea diseases
- List of cineraria diseases
- List of citrus diseases
- List of coconut palm diseases
- List of coffee diseases
- List of foliage plant diseases (Commelinaceae)
- List of common bean diseases
- List of cotton diseases
- List of Croton diseases
- List of crucifer diseases
- List of cucurbit diseases
- List of cyclamen diseases

Back to top

== D ==
- List of Dahlia diseases
- List of date palm diseases
- List of Douglas-fir diseases
- List of durian diseases and pests

Back to top

== E ==
- List of elm diseases
- List of English walnut diseases
- List of foliage plant diseases (Euphobiaceae)

Back to top

== F ==
- List of Ficus diseases
- List of flax diseases
- List of fuchsia diseases

Back to top

== G ==
- List of foliage plant diseases (Gentianaceae)
- List of geranium diseases
- List of foliage plant diseases (Gesneriaceae)
- List of grape diseases

Back to top

== H ==
- List of hazelnut diseases
- List of hemp diseases
- List of holiday cacti diseases
- List of hop diseases
- List of hydrangea diseases

Back to top

== I ==
- List of impatiens diseases

Back to top

== J ==
- List of Jerusalem cherry diseases

Back to top

== K ==
- List of kalanchoe diseases

Back to top

== L ==
- List of lentil diseases
- List of lettuce diseases
- List of lisianthus diseases

Back to top

== M ==
- List of maize diseases
- List of mango diseases
- List of foliage plant diseases (Maranthaceae)
- List of mimulus, monkey-flower diseases
- List of mint diseases
- List of foliage plant diseases (Moraceae)
- List of mustard diseases

Back to top

== N ==
Back to top

== O ==
- List of oats diseases

Back to top

== P ==
- List of papaya diseases
- List of pea diseases
- List of peach and nectarine diseases
- List of peanut diseases
- List of pear diseases
- List of pearl millet diseases
- List of pecan diseases
- List of Peperomia diseases
- List of pepper diseases
- List of Persian violet diseases
- List of pigeonpea diseases
- List of pineapple diseases
- List of foliage plant diseases (Piperaceae)
- List of pistachio diseases
- List of pocketbook plant diseases
- List of poinsettia diseases
- List of foliage plant diseases (Polypodiaceae)
- List of potato diseases
- List of primula diseases

Back to top

== Q ==
Back to top

== R ==
- List of Radermachera sinica diseases
- List of red clover diseases
- List of rhododendron diseases
- List of rice diseases
- List of rose diseases
- List of rye diseases

Back to top

== S ==
- List of safflower diseases
- List of sapphire flower diseases
- List of sorghum diseases
- List of soybean diseases
- List of spinach diseases
- List of strawberry diseases
- List of sugarcane diseases
- List of sunflower diseases
- List of sweetgum diseases
- List of sweetpotato diseases
- List of sycamore diseases

Back to top

== T ==
- List of tea diseases
- List of tobacco diseases
- List of tomato diseases

Back to top

== U ==
- List of foliage plant diseases (Urticaceae)

Back to top

== V ==
- List of verbena disease
- List of foliage plant diseases (Vitaceae)

Back to top

== W ==
- List of wheat diseases
- List of wild rice diseases

Back to top

== X ==
Back to top

== Y ==
Back to top

== Z ==
Back to top

== See also ==
- Lists of animal diseases
