= List of primula diseases =

This article is a list of diseases of Primulas: English primrose.

== Bacterial diseases ==
Bacterial diseases
Bacterial fasciation	Rhodococcus fascians
Bacterial soft rot	Erwinia carotovora subsp. carotovora = Pectobacterium carotovorum subsp. carotovorum
Crown gall	Agrobacterium tumefaciens
Pseudomonas leaf spot	Pseudomonas cichorii Pseudomonas syringae pv. primulae

== Fungal diseases ==
Fungal diseases
Anthracnose	Colletotrichum gloeosporioides
Botrytis blight	Botrytis cinerea
Phytophthora crown and root rot	Phytophthora cactorum Phytophthora citricola Phytophthora parasitica
Powdery mildew	Erysiphe polygoni
Pythium root rot	Pythium irregulare Pythium megalacanthum Pythium spinosum Pythium ultimum
Ramularia leaf spot	Ramularia primulae
Rhizoctonia root and crown rot	Rhizoctonia solani
Rust	Puccinia aristidae Uromyces apiosporus

== Nematodes, parasitic ==
Nematodes, parasitic
Bulb and stem nematode	Ditylenchus dipsaci
Foliar nematode	Aphelenchoides fragariae Aphelenchoides ritzemabosi
Lesion nematode	Pratylenchus sp.
Root-knot nematode	Meloidogyne hapla Meloidogyne javanica Meloidogyne arenaria

== Viral and viroid diseases ==
Viral and viroid diseases
Alfalfa mosaic	genus Alfamovirus, Alfalfa mosaic virus (AMV)
Cucumber mosaic	genus Cucumovirus, Cucumber mosaic virus (CMV)
Impatiens necrotic spot	genus Tospovirus, Impatiens necrotic spot virus (INSV)
Primula mosaic	genus Potyvirus, Primula mosaic virus (PrMV)
Primula mottle	genus Potyvirus, Primula mottle virus (PrMoV)
Tobacco necrosis	genus Necrovirus, Tobacco necrosis virus (TNV)
Tomato bushy stunt	genus Tombusvirus, Tomato bushy stunt virus (TBSV)
Tomato spotted wilt	genus Tospovirus, Tomato spotted wilt virus (TSWV)

== Phytoplasmal diseases ==
Phytoplasmal diseases
Aster yellows	Aster yellows phytoplasma
