= List of foliage plant diseases (Araceae) =

This is a list of diseases of foliage plants belonging to the Araceae.

== Plant Species ==
Plant species
Code	Scientifice Name	Common Name
Ag	Aglaonema spp.	Chinese evergreen and others
An	Anthurium spp.	
C	Caladium spp.	
D	Dieffenbachia spp.	dumb cane
E	Epipremnum aureum	pothos
M	Monstera spp.	
P	Philodendron spp.	
Ps	P. scandens subsp. oxycardium	heart-leaf philodendron
Sp	Spathiphyllum spp	peace lily
Sy	Syngonium spp. = Nephthytis spp.	

== Bacterial diseases ==
Bacterial diseases
Common name	Scientific name	Plants affected
Bacterial leaf spots	Erwinia carotovora subsp. carotovora	Ag, An, C, D, E, P, Sy
Bacterial leaf spots	E. chrysanthemi	Ag, D, E, P, Sy
Bacterial leaf spots	Pseudomonas cichorii	Ag, An, D, M, P, Sy
Bacterial leaf spots	Xanthomonas campestris pv. dieffenbachiae	D
Red-edge	Xanthomonas campestris pv. dieffenbachiae	Ps
Soft rot	Erwinia carotovora subsp. carotovora.	all

== Fungal diseases ==
Fungal diseases
Common name	Scientific name	Plants affected
Corynespora leaf spot	Corynespora cassiicola	A
Gray mold	Botrytis cinerea Botryotinia fuckeliana [teleomorph]	A
Myrothecium leaf spot	Myrothecium roridum	A
Phytophthora stem rot	Phytophthora nicotianae var. parasitica = Phytophthora parasitica = Phytophthora nicotianae	A
Rhizoctonia stem rot	Rhizoctonia solani Thanatephorus cucumeris [teleomorph]	A, F
Southern blight	Sclerotium rolfsii Athelia rolfsii [teleomorph]	A, F
Stem gall	Nectriella pironii Kutilakesa pironii [anamorph]	A

== Viral diseases ==
Viral diseases
Common name	Scientific name	Plants affected
Mosaic	Cucumber mosaic virus	A
Mottle	Bidens mottle virus	F
Spotted wilt	Tomato spotted wilt virus	A
