= List of anemone diseases =

This article is a list of diseases of anemones (Anemone coronaria).

== Bacterial diseases ==
Bacterial diseases
Crown gall	Agrobacterium tumefaciens

== Fungal diseases ==
Fungal diseases
Botrytis collar rot	Botrytis cinerea
Downy mildew	Plasmopara pygmaea
Leaf curl	Colletotrichum sp.
Phytophthora root and crown rot	Phytophthora cactorum
Powdery mildew	Erysiphe polygoni
Pythium root rot	Pythium sp.
Rhizoctonia stem and root rot	Rhizoctonia solani
Rust	Tranzschelia discolor
Sclerotinia blight	Sclerotinia sclerotiorum
Southern blight	Sclerotium rolfsii

== Virus and viroid diseases ==
Virus and viroid diseases
Cucumber mosaic	genus Cucumovirus, Cucumber mosaic virus (CMV)
Impatiens necrotic spot	genus Tospovirus, Impatiens necrotic spot virus (INSV)
Raspberry ringspot	genus Nepovirus, Raspberry ringspot virus (RRSV)
Tobacco necrosis	genus Necrovirus, Tobacco necrosis virus (TNV)
Tobacco ringspot	genus Nepovirus, Tobacco ringspot virus (TobRSV)
Tomato spotted wilt	genus Tospovirus, Tomato spotted wilt virus (TSWV)
Anemone mosaic	genus Potyvirus, Turnip mosaic virus (TuMV)
