= List of foliage plant diseases (Acanthaceae) =

This is a list of diseases of foliage plants belonging to the Acanthaceae.

== Plant species ==
Plant species
Code	Scientifice Name	Common Name
A	Aphelandra squarrosa	zebra plant
F	Fittonia verschaffeltii	nerve plant

== Bacterial diseases ==
Bacterial diseases
Common name	Scientific name	Plants affected
Bacterial leaf spot	Xanthomonas campestris	

== Fungal diseases ==
Fungal diseases
Common name	Scientific name	Plants affected
Corynespora leaf spot	Corynespora cassiicola	A
Gray mold	Botrytis cinerea Botryotinia fuckeliana [teleomorph]	A
Myrothecium leaf spot	Myrothecium roridum	A
Phytophthora stem rot	Phytophthora nicotianae var. parasitica = Phytophthora parasitica	A
Rhizoctonia stem rot	Rhizoctonia solani Thanatephorus cucumeris [teleomorph]	A, F
Southern blight	Agroathelia rolfsii	A, F
Stem gall	Nectriella pironii Kutilakesa pironii [anamorph]	A

== Viral diseases ==
Viral diseases
Common name	Scientific name	Plants affected
Mosaic	Cucumber mosaic virus	A
Mottle	Bidens mottle virus	F
Spotted wilt	Tomato spotted wilt virus	A
