= List of Persian violet diseases =

This article is a list of diseases of Persian violets (Exacum affine).

== Fungal diseases ==
Fungal diseases
Botrytis blight	Botrytis cinerea
Fusarium root and crown rot	Fusarium solani
Nectria canker	Nectria haematococca
Phytophthora blight	Phytophthora parasitica
Pythium root rot	Pythium sp.
Rhizoctonia root and crown rot	Rhizoctonia solani
Southern blight	Sclerotium rolfsii

== Nematode diseases ==
Nematode diseases
Common name	Scientific name
Lesion nematode	Pratylenchus coffeae

== Viral and viroid diseases ==
Viral and viroid diseases
Impatiens necrotic spot	genus Tospovirus, Impatiens necrotic spot virus (INSV)
