= List of bellflower diseases =

This article is a list of diseases of bellflowers (Campanula carpatica).

== Bacterial diseases ==
Bacterial diseases
Crown gall	Agrobacterium tumefaciens

== Fungal diseases ==
Fungal diseases
Ascochyta leaf spot	Ascochyta bohemica
Botrytis blight	Botrytis cinerea
Cercospora leaf spot	Cercospora minuta
Charcoal rot	Macrophomina phaseolina
Cylindrocarpon root and petiole rot	Cylindrocarpon destructans
Fusarium root rot	Fusarium sp.
Phyllosticta leaf spot	Phyllosticta alliariaefoliae
Powdery mildew	Erysiphe cichoracearum
Ramularia leaf spot	Ramularia macrospora
Rhizoctonia root rot	Rhizoctonia solani
Rust	Aecidium campanulastri Coleosporium tussilaginis Puccinia campanulae
Sclerotinia blight	Sclerotinia sclerotiorum
Septoria leaf spot	Septoria campanulae
Southern blight	Sclerotium rolfsii

== Viral and viroid diseases ==
Viral and viroid diseases
Cucumber mosaic	Cucumber mosaic virus (CMV)
Impatiens necrotic spot	Impatiens necrotic spot virus (INSV)
Spotted wilt	Tomato spotted wilt virus (TSWV)
