= List of Dahlia diseases =

This article is a list of diseases of dahlia (Dahlia sp.).

== Bacterial diseases ==
Bacterial diseases
Bacterial wilt	Pseudomonas solanacearum
Crown gall	Agrobacterium tumefaciens
Leafy gall	Rhodococcus fascians

== Fungal diseases ==
Fungal diseases
Flower blight	Botrytis cinerea
Leaf spot	Alternaria alternata
Powdery mildew	Golovinomyces ambrosiae s.l. Podosphaera xanthii s.l.
Southern blight	Sclerotium rolfsii Athelia rolfsii [teleomorph]
Smut	Entyloma dahliae
Stem and tuber rot	Rhizoctonia solani Thanatephorus cucumeris [teleomorph]
Cottony stem rot	Sclerotinia sclerotiorum
Vascular wilt	Fusarium oxysporum Verticillium albo-atrum

== Viral diseases ==
Viral diseases
Mosaic	Cucumber mosaic virus (CSV), Dahlia mosaic virus (DMV)
RNA virus	Tobacco streak virus (TSV)
Ringspot	Impatiens necrotic spot virus (INSV), Tomato spotted wilt virus (TSWV)
