= List of hydrangea diseases =

This article is a list of diseases of hydrangeas (Hydrangea macrophylla).

== Bacterial diseases ==
Bacterial diseases
Bacterial blight	Pseudomonas solanacearum
Bacterial leaf spot	Pseudomonas cichorii

== Fungal diseases ==
Fungal diseases
Bud and flower	Cercospora hydrangeae Corynespora cassiicola Phyllosticta hydrangeae Septoria hydrangeae
Powdery mildew	Erysiphe polygoni
Root rot	Pythium spp.
Rust	Pucciniastrum hydrangeae
Southern blight	Sclerotium rolfsii Athelia rolfsii [teleomorph]

== Viral diseases ==
Viral diseases
Phyllody	Hydrangea ringspot virus
Ringspots	Hydrangea ringspot virus
Tobacco ringspot virus	Tomato spotted wilt virus
