= List of Peperomia diseases =

This is a list of diseases that affect the genus Peperomia.

== Fungal diseases ==
Fungal diseases
Common name	Scientific name
Anthracnose	Colletotrichum spp.
Cercospora leaf spot	Cercospora spp.
Myrothecium leaf spot	Myrothecium roridum
Phytophthora stem and root rot	Phytophthora nicotianae var. parasitica = Phytophthora parasitica = Phytophthora nicotianae
Pythium root rot	Pythium splendens
Rhizoctonia leaf spot	Rhizoctonia solani
Southern blight	Sclerotium rolfsii
Verticillium wilt	Verticillium albo-atrum

== Viral diseases ==
Viral diseases
Common name	Scientific name
Mosaic	Cucumber mosaic virus
Ring spot	Unidentified virus
