= List of Ficus diseases =

This is a list of diseases affecting species of the genus Ficus.

== Plant Species ==
Plant species
Fb	Ficus benjamina	weeping fig
Fe	F. elastica	rubber tree
Fer	F. erecta	Japanese fig
Fl	F. lyrata	fiddle-leaf fig

== Bacterial diseases ==
Bacterial diseases
Common name	Scientific name	Plants affected
Bacterial leaf spot	Pseudomonas cichorii	Fb, Fe, Fl
Bacterial leaf spot	Pseudomonas ficuserectae	Fer
Bacterial leaf spot	Xanthomonas campestris	
Crown gall	Agrobacterium tumefaciens	Fb, Fe

== Fungal diseases ==
Fungal diseases
Common name	Scientific name	Plants affected
Anthracnose	Colletotrichum gloeosporioides	Fe, Fl
Cercospora leaf spot	Cercospora spp.	Fe
Corynespora leaf spot	Corynespora cassiicola	Fb
Gray mold	Botrytis cinerea	Fe, Fl
Phomopsis dieback	Diplodia spp.	Fb
Southern blight	Sclerotium rolfsii	Fb, Fe, Fl
Verticillium wilt	Verticillium albo-atrum	Fb

== Nematodes, parasitic ==
Nematodes, parasitic
Common name	Scientific name	Plants affected
Foliar nematode	Aphelenchoides besseyi	Fe
Lesion nematodes	Pratylenchus spp.	Fb, Fe
