= List of Erythranthe, monkey-flower diseases =

This article is a list of diseases of Erythranthe (formerly Mimulus), Monkey-Flower (Erythranthe × hybridus) as reported by the American Phytopathological Society.

== Bacterial diseases ==
Bacterial diseases
Crown gall	Agrobacterium tumefaciens

== Fungal diseases ==
Fungal diseases
Botrytis blight	Botrytis cinerea
Powdery mildew	Erysiphe brunneopunctata Erysiphe cichoracearum
Pythium root rot	Pythium sp.

== Viral diseases ==
Viral diseases
Impatiens necrotic spot	genus Tospovirus, Impatiens necrotic spot virus (INSV)

== Phytoplasmal diseases ==
Phytoplasmal diseases
Aster yellows	Aster yellows phytoplasma
