= Soybean vein necrosis virus =

Virus classification
- (unranked): Virus
- Realm: Riboviria
- Kingdom: Orthornavirae
- Phylum: Negarnaviricota
- Class: Bunyaviricetes
- Order: Elliovirales
- Family: Tospoviridae
- Genus: Orthotospovirus
- Species: Orthotospovirus glycininecrovenae

Synonyms
- Soybean vein necrosis orthotospovirus

Species of virus

Soybean vein necrosis virus (SVNV, previously: Soybean vein necrosis associated virus SVNaV) is a plant pathogenic virus of soybeans (Glycine max). SVNV was discovered in Tennessee in 2008 and has recently been found in many US states from the Southeast and East coast to some western states including CA. This pathogen initially causes intraveinal chlorosis (yellowing) in leaves. This chlorosis then spreads throughout the leaf and eventually these chlorotic areas can become necrotic. It is a member of the order Elliovirales, family Tospoviridae and genus Orthotospovirus, which is the only genus within this virus family that infects plants. Like other members of Elliovirales, this virus is enveloped and has a negative sense single-stranded RNA (−ssRNA) genome composed of three genomic segments (S, M, and L). It encodes proteins on the M and S segments in an ambisense manner.

== Genome ==
The genome of SVNV is a negative sense single stranded RNA virus (Group V) that has three segments (S, M, and L segments). The L segment is 9010 nt and encodes for the RNA-dependent RNA polymerase (RdRp). The M segment is 4955 nt and to encode for NSm and G_{N}/G_{C} proteins. The S segment is 2603 nt and encodes the N and NSs proteins. This virus codes proteins from the M and S segments in an ambisense manner, meaning that proteins are translated from both positive and negative sense RNA. There is preliminary evidence to suggest low diversity within SVNV. These proteins occur in all members of the Tospovirus genus, and likely serve similar functions within SVNV as they do for Tomato spotted wilt virus (TSWV). The RdRp aids in replication and transcription of the RNA. The NSm protein is a non-structural protein (not present in mature virion) and is critical to cell-to-cell movement within plant cells (8). The NSs protein is also a non-structural protein and contributes to suppression of RNA silencing during plant infection. Glycoproteins (G_{N}/G_{C}) are necessary for successful thrips transmission. The N protein contributes to viral replication, and coats the genomic RNA within the virion.

== Transmission ==
Presently the soybean thrips (Neohydatothrips variabilis) is the only known vector of SVNV. Research needs to be done to verify if this is the only thrips species capable of transmitting this new and widespread virus. This virus is believed to have a transmission cycle similar to other members of the Tospovirus genus. In TSWV, acquisition of the virus by the thrips vector can only occur during the larval stage of development by the thrips. From the larval stage the virus is passed transstadially to the adult stage. Adult thrips are then able via feeding to transmit the virus to the plant host. It is important to keep in mind with this pathogen, as with all vectored pathogens, that behavior of the vector can contribute to the potential spread of the disease.

== Agricultural importance ==
Agricultural importance remains to be assessed. Typically thrips feeding alone on soybean plants does not cause economic damage, however it may if the plant is under some other form of stress. The impact of SVNV in terms of yield loss has not yet been determined. Presently no other agronomic crops are known hosts for SVNV.

== Diagnosis ==
Symptoms associated with SVNV infection begin with vein clearing and then yellowing (chlorosis) in areas near veins. Chlorotic areas eventually can turn into red-brown lesions (necrotic lesions). If the disease is severe enough leaves can fall off. If a farmer believes they have SVNV in their field, they should send samples to their local extension office. To verify SVNV presence laboratories will likely use an ELISA or PCR method.

== Epidemiology ==
SVNV was first identified in Tennessee in 2008. Presently it has been detected in: AL, DE, IA, IL, KS, KY, MD, MS, MO, NY, PA, TN and WI. Cultivars of soybeans have been shown to differ in expression of symptoms. Mildly impacted cultivars may only show thread-like vein clearing, whereas other cultivars may have necrosis that covers most of a given leaf and in cases of severe necrosis these leaves can fall off. Tentative testing indicates that Ipomoea hederacea (ivy leaf morning glory) may be another host of this virus, which may prove significant as this can be commonly found as a weed in soybean fields.

This pathogen is an arbovirus, and therefore must be transmitted by a vector. A known vector of the virus is Sericothrips variablilis (soybean thrips). Soybean thrips are found in many regions of the US including the Southeast, Midwest, East Coast, and AZ, CA, TX, and UT.

Portions of the virus that are believed to be critical for the spread of this virus, based on what is known for other members of the genus Tospovirus are the movement protein (NSm) and the glycoproteins (GC/GN). The Nsm protein is critical for cell-to-cell movement within plants. The glycoproteins (G_{C}/G_{N}) have been found to be necessary for thrips transmission.

== Management ==
Presently, there are no management recommendations. This is a relatively new disease and as such whether or not there is a significant yield impact remains to be determined. Thrips themselves do not typically cause economic damage on soybeans. Insecticide application targeting thrips for control of the pathogen is not presently recommended. Land Grant universities’ extension (agricultural extension) websites should be monitored for new developments in management as this pathogen undergoes continued study.
