= List of foliage plant diseases (Maranthaceae) =

This is a list of diseases of foliage plants belonging to the family Marantaceae.

== Plant Species ==
diseases
Code	Scientifice Name	Common Name
C	Calathea spp.	
M	Maranta leuconeura	prayer plant

== Bacterial diseases ==
Bacterial diseases
Common name	Scientific name	Plants affected
Pseudomonas leaf spot	Pseudomonas sp.	C
Pseudomonas leaf spot	P. cichorii	C

== Fungal diseases ==
Fungal diseases
Common name	Scientific name	Plants affected
Alternaria leaf spot	Alternaria alternata	C
Fusarium root rot	Fusarium oxysporum	C
Helminthosporium leaf spot	Bipolaris setariae Cochliobolus setariae [teleomorph]	C, M

== Nematodes, parasitic ==
Nematodes, parasitic
Common name	Scientific name	Plants affected
Burrowing	Radopholus similis	C, M
Root-knot	Meloidogyne javanica	M

== Viral diseases ==
Viral diseases
Common name	Scientific name	Plants affected
Mosaic	Cucumber mosaic virus	C, M
