= PRMV =

PRMV may refer to:

- Peach rosette mosaic virus, a plant pathogenic virus of the family Comoviridae

PrMV may refer to:

- Primula mosaic virus, a plant pathogenic virus of the family Potyviridae
