= List of sapphire flower diseases =

This article is a list of diseases of sapphire flowers (Browallia speciosa).

== Bacterial diseases ==
Bacterial diseases
Southern wilt	Ralstonia solanacearum = Pseudomonas solanacearum

== Fungal diseases ==
Fungal diseases
Botrytis blight	Botrytis cinerea
Fusarium wilt	Fusarium sp.
Verticillium wilt	Verticillium albo-atrum

== Viral and viroid diseases ==
Viral and viroid diseases
Impatiens necrotic spot	Impatiens necrotic spot virus (INSV)
Spotted wilt	Tomato spotted wilt virus (TSWV)
