= List of Radermachera sinica diseases =

This is a list of diseases of Radermachera sinica (China doll).

== Fungal diseases ==
Fungal diseases
Common name	Scientific name
Corynespora leaf spot	Corynespora cassiicola
Myrothecium leaf spot	Myrothecium roridum
Phytophthora stem rot	Phytophthora nicotianae var. parasitica = Phytophthora parasitica = Phytophthora nicotianae
Rhizoctonia stem and root rot	Rhizoctonia solani
