= List of foliage plant diseases (Gesneriaceae) =

This is a list of diseases of foliage plants belonging to the family Gesneriaceae.

== Plant Species ==
Plant species
Code	Scientifice Name	Common Name
A	Aeschynanthus pulcher	lipstick vine
Sa	Saintpaulia ionantha	African violet
Si	Sinningia spp.	gloxinia

== Bacterial diseases ==
Bacterial diseases
Common name	Scientific name	Plants affected
Bacterial leaf spot	Pseudomonas spp.	Si
Erwinia blight	Erwinia chrysanthemi	Sa

== Fungal diseases ==
Fungal diseases
Common name	Scientific name	Plants affected
Corynespora leaf spot	Corynespora cassiicola	A, Sa
Gray mold	Botrytis cinerea	A, Sa, Si
Myrothecium leaf spot	Myrothecium roridum	A, Si
Phytophthora stem rot	Phytophthora nicotianae var. parasitica = Phytophthora parasitica = Phytophthora nicotianae	A, Sa, Si
Powdery mildew	Oidium spp.	Sa

== Viral diseases ==
Viral diseases
Common name	Scientific name	Plants affected
Mosaic	Tobacco mosaic virus	Si
Rings		Si
Ringspot	Tomato ringspot virus	Si
Spotted wilt	Tomato spotted wilt virus	Sa, Si

== Nematodes, parasitic ==
Nematodes, parasitic
Common name	Scientific name	Plants affected
Foliar	Aphelenchoides spp.	Sa, Si
