= List of foliage plant diseases (Vitaceae) =

This is a list of diseases of foliage plants belonging to the family Vitaceae.

== Plant Species ==
Plant species
Code	Scientifice Name	Common Name
Cr	Cissus striata C. rhombifolia	grape ivy
Ca	C. antarctica	kangaroo vine

== Fungal diseases ==
Fungal diseases
Common name	Scientific name	Plants affected
Anthracnose	Colletotrichum spp.	Ca, Cr
Downy mildew	Plasmopara spp.	Ca, Cr
Gray mold	Botrytis cinerea	Ca, Cr
Powdery mildew	Erysiphe spp.	Cr
Rhizoctonia aerial blight	Rhizoctonia solani	Ca, Cr

== See also ==
- List of grape diseases
