= List of Croton diseases =

This is a list of diseases of croton (Codiaeum variegatum) plants.

== Bacterial diseases ==
Bacterial diseases
Common name	Scientific name
Crown gall	Agrobacterium tumefaciens

== Fungal diseases ==
Fungal diseases
Common name	Scientific name
Anthracnose	Glomerella cingulata
Bacterial leaf spot	Xanthomonas campestris
Stem gall and canker	Nectriella pironii Kutilakesa pironii [anamorph]
