= Brown patch =

Fungal disease affecting turfgrasses

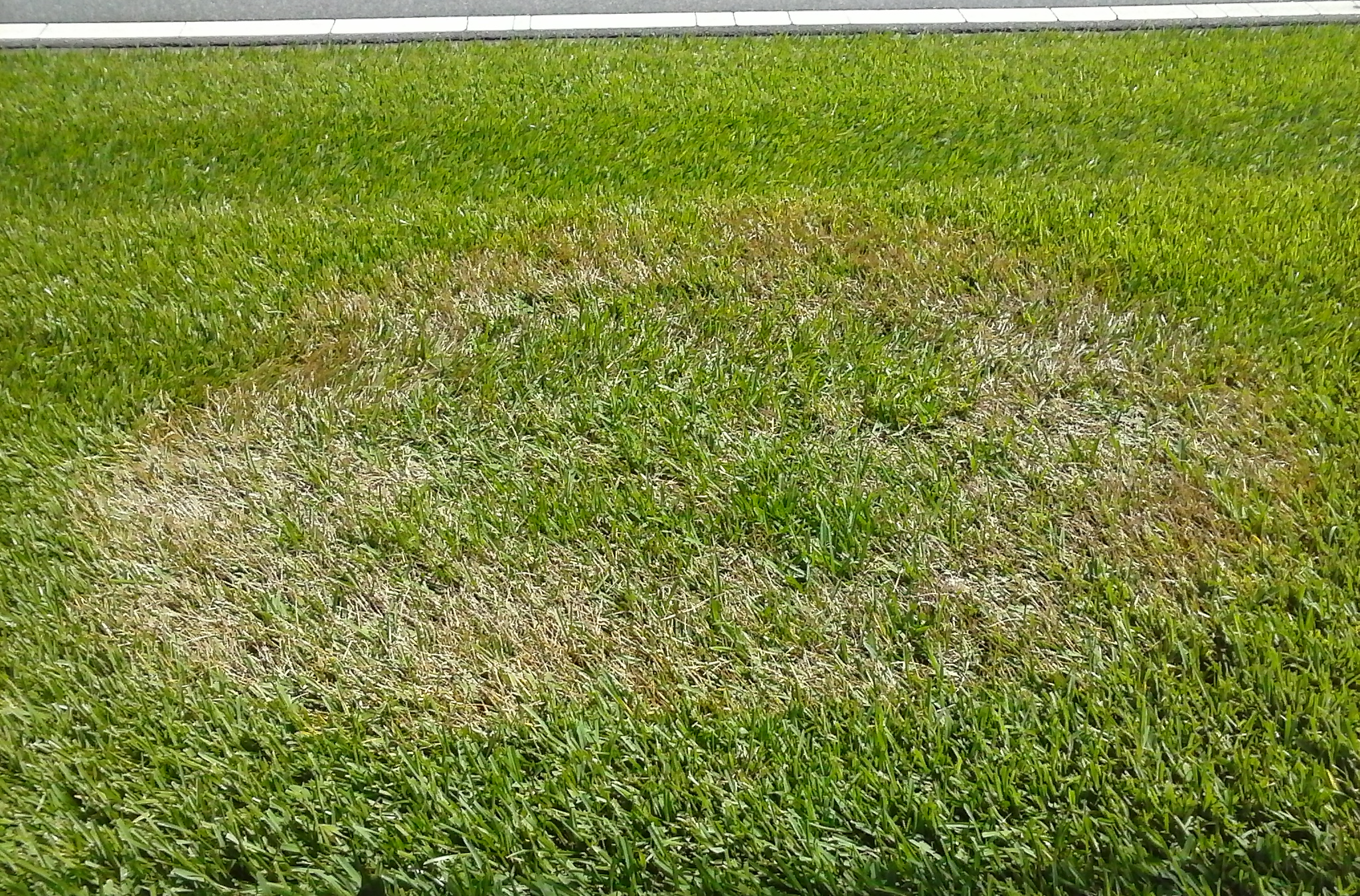
R. solani on centipedegrass

Brown patch is a common turfgrass fungal disease that is caused by species in the genus Rhizoctonia, usually Rhizoctonia solani. Brown patch can be found in all of the cool season turfgrasses found in the United States. Brown patch is most devastating to: Bentgrass (Agrostis sp.), ryegrass (Lolium sp.), Annual bluegrass (Poa annua), and Tall fescue (Festuca arundinacea). Brown patch is also found in Kentucky bluegrass (Poa pratensis) and Fine fescue (Festuca sp.) but this is rare or does minimal damage. Brown patch is known as a foliar disease, so it does not have any effect on the crown or roots of the turf plant.

== Symptoms ==
Brown patch symptoms differ depending on the various maintenance practices performed on the turfgrass (mowing height, fertilizer, watering, etc.) Symptoms on turfgrasses that are wet for extended periods and are closely mowed will produce a distinctive gray-purplish bordered ring "smoke-ring" that is up to 50 cm in diameter. While on taller cut grasses that are not wet for extended periods of time will begin to produce patches that can be several feet in diameter and may have a "frogeye" appearance. White mycelium can be found on dew-covered turf in the early part of the morning. On a closer look at the grass leaf blades (usually on Tall Fescue) you maybe able to see tan to brown small, irregular shaped lesions.

== Disease cycle ==
The Rhizoctonia species thrives in temperatures ranging from 70 °F to 90 °F but can survive in freezing temperatures. Brown patch is most common when night temperatures fail to drop below 68 °F and during extended periods of high humidity or prolonged leaf wetness. The Rhizoctonia species has two specific fungi that affects the turf plant at different times of the year. In most cases Rhizoctonia solani will cause Brown patch in June throughout early July. While when temperatures begin to heat up and the air becomes more humid Rhizoctonia solani will be replaced by Rhizoctonia zeae. It has been found that the Rhizoctonia species is capable of surviving in the soil for many years without affecting turfgrass. During the winter months the fungus will lie dormant in the grass tissue or soil and form into resting bodies called sclerotia.

== Cultural control ==
Similar to most turfgrass diseases one of the best cultural practice to prevent Brown patch is by incorporating new disease resistant turfgrass varieties. To find these new cultivars you can visit turfgrass seed distributors, extension specialists, or visit the National Turfgrass Evaluation Program. If incorporating disease resistant varieties of turfgrass is not an option then focus on better management practices. Some of the management practice include reducing thatch, having adequate drainage, and removing dew during hot and humid weather. Dew can be removed from the grass from mowing, using a backpack blower, or dragging a hose across the grass. Install an internal drainage system if you have severe drainage problems. Improve air circulation and avoid irrigation practices that will leave moisture on the grass blades for extended periods of time. An adequate aeration program will relieve compaction and improve drainage. Aeration should annually disrupt between 15 and 20% of the total surface area. Be sure that you are not applying excess nitrogen to your soil. Most balanced fertility programs for Kentucky Bluegrass lawns will consist of applying two to five lbs of nitrogen/1000 sq.ft. a year.

== Chemical control ==
If severe enough or on high valued turf (ex. golf greens) summer patch can be controlled with the use of fungicides. The application of fungicides is usually done on a curative basis. Apply fungicides at the very first sign of Brown patch symptoms. In traditionally bad areas that cause severe damage to the turf a preventative fungicide application will work best. Fungicides should be applied according to the instructions on the label, the application of fungicides containing thiophanate-methyl and/or chlorothalonil in weather above 90 °F have been proven ineffective against Rhizoctonia zeae. Minimize the cost of applying fungicides by selecting fungicides that will work on a wide range of turfgrass diseases at the same time.

Effective fungicides includes:

- Benzimidazoles : Pro Turf
- Carboximides : Prostar
- DMIs : Banner, Bayleton
- Dicarboximides : Proturf Fungicide X, Touche
- Dithiocarbamates : Captan
- Nitriles : Daconil
- QoIs : Heritage, Compass, Insignia
- Antibiotics : Endorse (polyoxin D)
- Phenylpyrroles : Medallion
