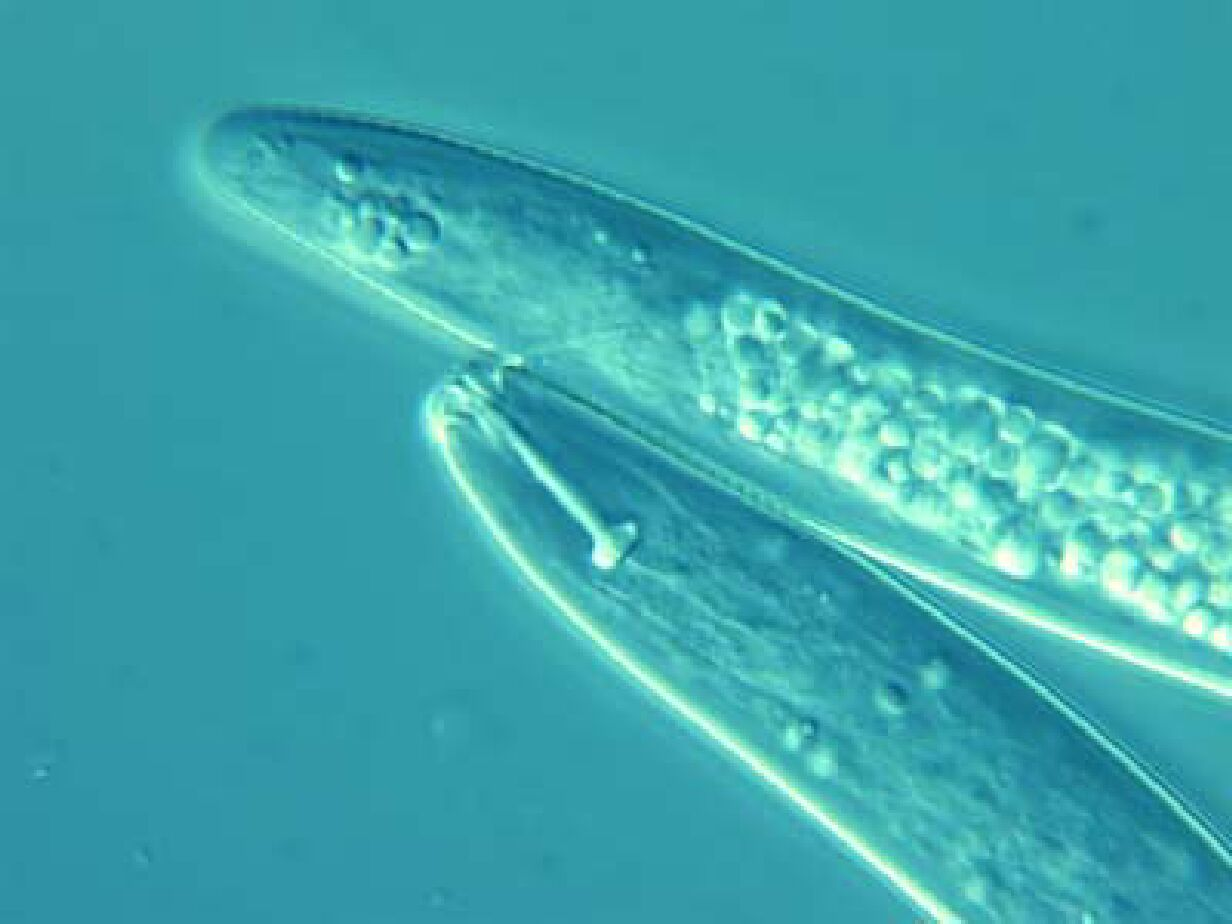

Scientific classification
- Domain: Eukaryota
- Kingdom: Animalia
- Phylum: Nematoda
- Class: Secernentea
- Order: Tylenchida
- Family: Pratylenchidae
- Genus: Pratylenchus
- Species: P. coffeae

Binomial name
- Pratylenchus coffeae (Zimmermann, 1898) Filipjev & Schuurmans Stekhoven, 1941

Synonyms
- Tylenchus coffeae Zimmermann, 1898

= Pratylenchus coffeae =

Species of roundworm

Pratylenchus coffeae is a plant-pathogenic nematode infecting several hosts including potato, banana, sweet potato, strawberry, Persian violet, peanut and citrus. It has the smallest known genome of any animal.
