= List of foliage plant diseases (Asclepiadaceae) =

This is a list of diseases of foliage plants belonging to the family Asclepiadaceae.

== Plant Species ==
Plant Species
Code	Scientifice Name	Common Name
H	Hoya carnosa	wax plant

== Fungal diseases ==
Fungal diseases
Common name	Scientific name	Plants affected
Cercospora leaf spot	Cercospora spp.	H
Gray mold	Botrytis cinerea	H
Rhizoctonia aerial blight	Rhizoctonia solani	H
