= Hydrangea ringspot virus =

Virus classification
- (unranked): Virus
- Realm: Riboviria
- Kingdom: Orthornavirae
- Phylum: Kitrinoviricota
- Class: Alsuviricetes
- Order: Tymovirales
- Family: Alphaflexiviridae
- Genus: Potexvirus
- Species: Potexvirus hydrangeae

Species of virus

Hydrangea ringspot virus (HRSV) is a plant pathogenic virus of the family Alphaflexiviridae.
