= Pseudomonas ficuserectae =

Scientific classification
- Domain: Bacteria
- Kingdom: Pseudomonadati
- Phylum: Pseudomonadota
- Class: Gammaproteobacteria
- Order: Pseudomonadales
- Family: Pseudomonadaceae
- Genus: Pseudomonas
- Species: P. ficuserectae

Binomial name
- Pseudomonas ficuserectae Goto 1983

Type strain
- ATCC 35104 CCUG 32779; CFBP 3224; JCM 2400; LMG 5694

Species of bacterium

Pseudomonas ficuserectae is a nonfluorescent, Gram-negative, soil bacterium that causes bacterial leaf spot on the Japanese fig (Ficus erecta), from which it derives its name. Based on 16S rRNA analysis, P. ficuserectae has been classified within the P. syringae group.
