= List of foliage plant diseases (Araucariaceae) =

This is a list of diseases of foliage plants belonging to the family Araucariaceae.

== Plant species ==
Plant species
A	Araucaria heterophylla	Norfolk Island Pine

== Fungal diseases ==
Fungal diseases
Code	Scientifice Name	Common Name
Bleeding canker	Dothiorella spp. Lasiodiplodia theobromae = Botryodiplodia theobromae	A
Cylindrocladium root rot	Cylindrocladium spp.	A
Needle blight	Colletotrichum gloeosporioides = Colletotrichum derridis	A
Pythium root rot	Pythium spp.	A
