= Primula mosaic virus =

Primula mosaic virus (PrMV)

Virus classification
- Group: Group IV ((+)ssRNA)
- Family: Potyviridae
- Genus: Potyvirus
- Species: Primula mosaic virus

Species of virus

Primula mosaic virus (PrMV) is a plant pathogenic virus of the family Potyviridae.
