= Necrovirus =

Defunct genus of viruses

Necrovirus was a genus of viruses. In 2012, the genus was abolished and split into two genera that still bear its name: Alphanecrovirus and Betanecrovirus.
