= Sarcopodium pironii =

Scientific classification
- Kingdom: Fungi
- Division: Ascomycota
- Class: incertae sedis
- Order: incertae sedis
- Family: incertae sedis
- Genus: Sarcopodium
- Species: S. pironii

Binomial name
- Sarcopodium pironii (Alfieri) Ts. Watan. (1993)

Synonyms
- Kutilakesa pironii Alfieri (1979)

Species of fungus

Sarcopodium pironii is an ascomycete fungus that is a plant pathogen.
