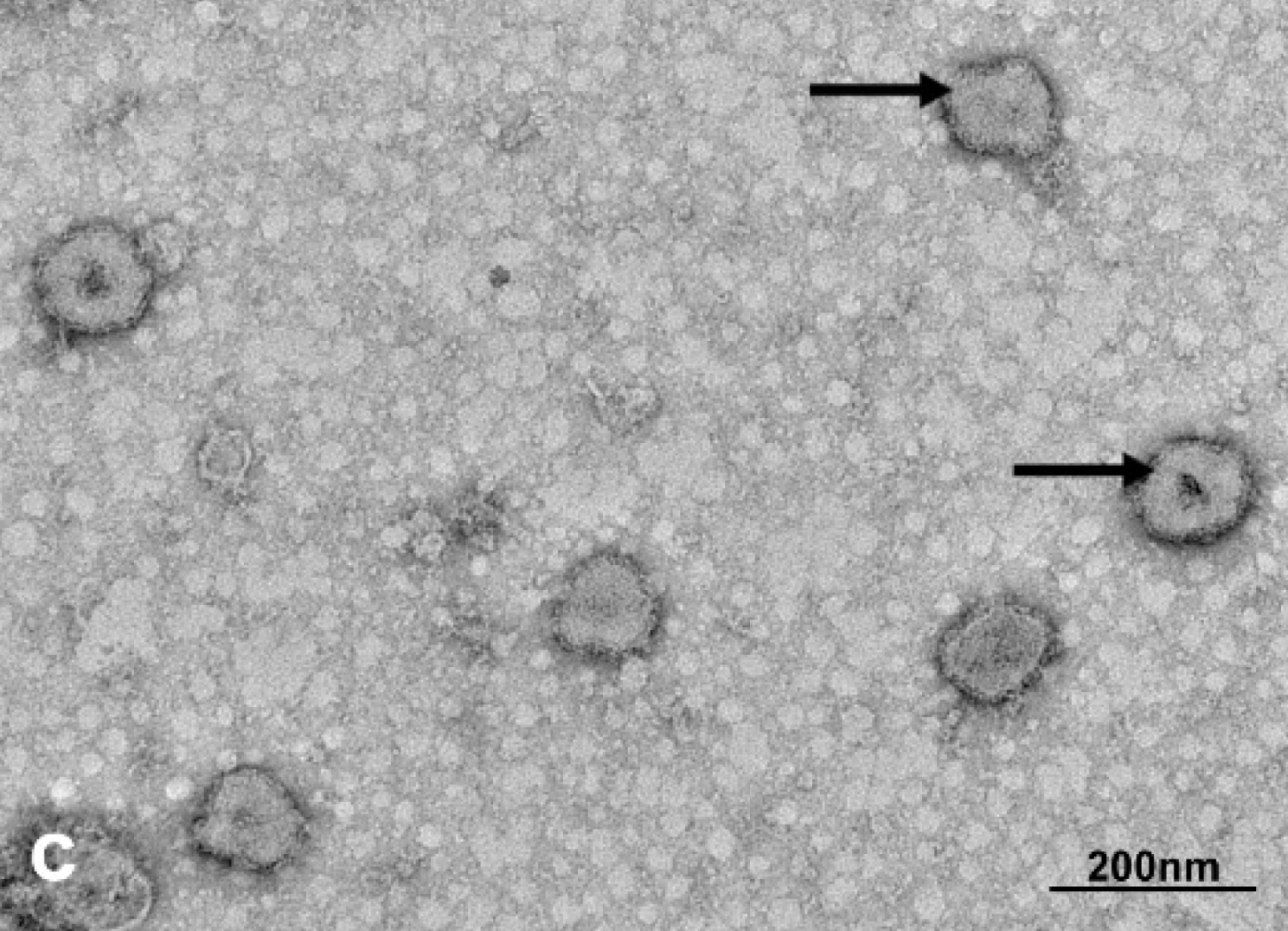
- Transmission electron micrograph of tomato yellow ring virus

Virus classification
- (unranked): Virus
- Realm: Riboviria
- Kingdom: Orthornavirae
- Phylum: Negarnaviricota
- Class: Bunyaviricetes
- Order: Elliovirales
- Family: Tospoviridae
- Genus: Orthotospovirus

Species
- See text

= Orthotospovirus =

Genus of viruses

Orthotospovirus is a genus of negative-strand RNA viruses, in the family Tospoviridae of the order Elliovirales, which infects plants. Tospoviruses take their name from the species Tomato spotted wilt virus (TSWV) which was discovered in Australia in 1919. TSWV remained the only known member of the family until the early 1990s when genetic characterisation of plant viruses became more common. There are now 36 species in the genus. Member viruses infect over eight hundred plant species from 82 different families.

== Genome ==
Tospoviruses have a negative-sense, single-strand RNA genome. The genome resembles that of the genus Phlebovirus. It is linear and is 17.2 kb in size. It is divided into three segments termed S (2.9kb), M (5.4kb), and L (8.9kb). The M and S RNA segments encode for proteins in an ambisense direction.

== Transmission ==
Tospoviruses are arboviruses usually vectored by thrips. At least ten species of thrips belonging to family Thripidae have been confirmed as vectors for the transmission of thirteen or more tospoviruses. The thrips vectors are not closely related, implying an independent origin of infection for each thrips, possibly transmitted horizontally through shared hosts. There may be other species of thrips competent to transmit similar viruses, but they have not been documented on crops of economic significance.

Recent research concludes that thrips can only be infected by tospovirus during the larval phases of development, as pupation and metamorphosis separate the connection between the salivary glands and the infected muscle tissue of the mid-gut. Adults transmit the virus from infected salivary glands, and uninfected adults will not transmit the virus. Obviously, controlling the infection by limiting transmission from infected plants to larval thrips or by preventing adult dispersal from infected plants are key strategies in preventing an epidemic of the disease.

== Agricultural importance ==
Infection with these viruses results in spotting and wilting of the plant, reduced vegetative output, and eventually death. No antiviral cures have been developed for plants infected with a Tospovirus, and infected plants should be removed from a field and destroyed in order to prevent the spread of the disease.

A large number of plant families are known to be affected by viruses of the Tospovirus genus. These include both food crops (such as peanuts, watermelons, capsicums, tomatoes, zucchinis, et al.) as well as ornamental species which are important to flower farms (calla lily, impatiens, chrysanthemums, iris, et al.). For a more complete list of hosts examine the Tospovirus host list at Kansas State University.

== Diagnosis ==
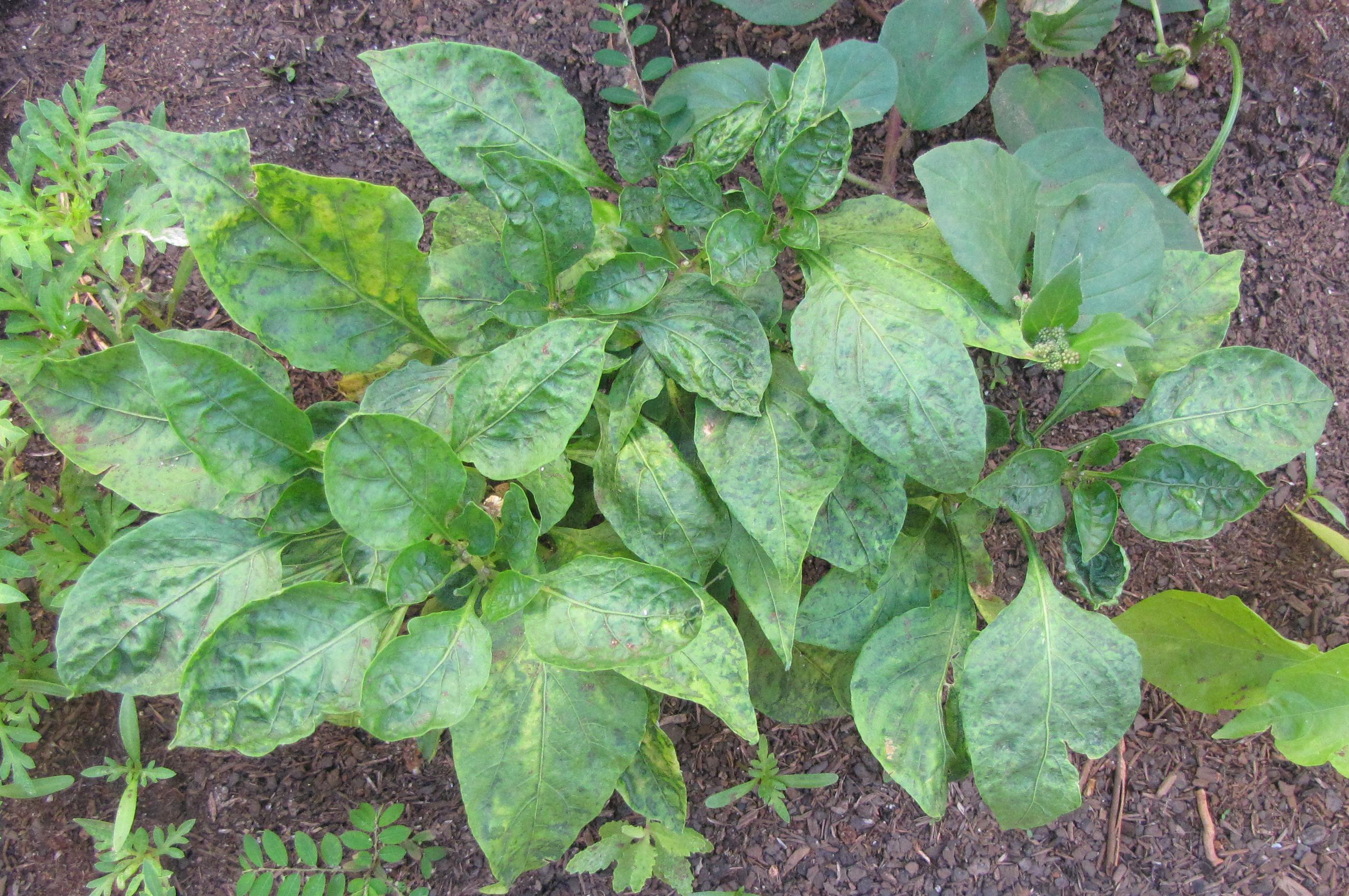
Pepper infected with Tomato spotted wilt virus. Plant of Pimiento L sweet pepper.

Early symptoms of infection are difficult to diagnose. In young infected plants the characteristic symptoms consist of inward cupping of leaves and leaves that develop a bronze cast followed by dark spots. As the infection progresses additional symptoms develop which include dark streaks on the main stem and wilting of the top portion of the plant. Fruit may be deformed, show uneven ripening and often have raised bumps on the surface. Once a plant becomes infected the disease cannot be controlled.

Serological and molecular tests are commercially available to diagnose TSWV as well as a second common tospovirus found in ornamentals, Impatiens necrotic spot virus (INSV). Cytological studies of TSWV and INSV have shown that these viruses produce granular inclusions in the cytoplasm of infected plants. These inclusions can be seen in the light microscope with proper staining techniques. These inclusions can be diagnostic.

== Epidemiology ==
Tospoviruses are prevalent in warm climates in regions with a high population of thrips. For instance TSWV is an agricultural pest in Asia, America, Europe and Africa. Over the past 15 years outbreaks of Tomato spotted wilt disease have become more prevalent in these regions. Therefore, TSWV is described as an emerging viral disease of plants. The increased prevalence is largely because of the successful survival of the thrips vector Frankliniella occidentalis. Another thrips, Scirtothrips dorsalis, has also been implicated in the transmission of at least three tospoviruses, but there remains some controversy over its efficiency as a vector. Immunological testing and vector-competence studies suggest that S. dorsalis may represents a non-transmitting carrier for some strains of virus.

The success of this virus has also been attributed to the acquisition of a gene in the M segment of the genome which encodes a movement protein. This protein allows the virus to infect a wide range of hosts. The gene encoding this protein was likely acquired by recombination from either a plant host or from another plant virus.

== Management ==
Control of these diseases is difficult. One of the reasons for this is that the wide host range allows the viruses to successfully overseason from one crop to the next. To prevent spread of the virus infected plants should be immediately removed away from neighbouring plants. Control of insects, especially thrips, is important to reduce spread of the virus by vectors.

== Taxonomy ==
The genus contains the following species, listed by scientific name and followed by the common name:

- Orthotospovirus alstroemeriflavi, Alstroemeria yellow spot virus
- Orthotospovirus alstroemerinecrosis, Alstroemeria necrotic streak virus
- Orthotospovirus arachianuli, Groundnut ringspot virus
- Orthotospovirus arachiflavamaculae, Groundnut yellow spot virus
- Orthotospovirus arachiflavi, Groundnut chlorotic fan-spot virus
- Orthotospovirus arachinecrosis, Groundnut bud necrosis virus
- Orthotospovirus barlerichlorosis, Barleria chlorosis-associated virus
- Orthotospovirus callaflavi, Calla lily chlorotic spot virus
- Orthotospovirus capsiciflavi, Capsicum chlorosis virus
- Orthotospovirus capsiciflavianuli, chilli yellow ringspot virus
- Orthotospovirus capsicimaculaflavi, Pepper chlorotic spot virus
- Orthotospovirus chrysanthinecrocaulis, Chrysanthemum stem necrosis virus
- Orthotospovirus citrullomaculosi, Watermelon silver mottle virus
- Orthotospovirus citrullonecrosis, Watermelon bud necrosis virus
- Orthotospovirus cucurbichlorosis, Zucchini lethal chlorosis virus
- Orthotospovirus eustomae, Lisianthus necrotic ringspot virus
- Orthotospovirus fatsiae Fatsia japonica ringspot-associated virus
- Orthotospovirus glycininecrovenae, Soybean vein necrosis virus
- Orthotospovirus hippeflavi, Hippeastrum chlorotic ringspot virus
- Orthotospovirus impatiensnecromaculae, Impatiens necrotic spot virus
- Orthotospovirus iridimaculaflavi, Iris yellow spot virus
- Orthotospovirus limonii, Limonium orthotospovirus 1
- Orthotospovirus macadamianuli, Macadamia ringspot-associated virus
- Orthotospovirus meloflavi, Melon yellow spot virus
- Orthotospovirus melotessellati, Melon severe mosaic virus
- Orthotospovirus mercurialis, Mercurialis orthotospovirus 1
- Orthotospovirus morivenae, Mulberry vein banding associated virus
- Orthotospovirus phaseolinecrotessellati, Bean necrotic mosaic virus
- Orthotospovirus polygonianuli, Polygonum ringspot virus
- Orthotospovirus scadoxiflavianuli, Scadoxus chlorotic ringspot virus
- Orthotospovirus tomatanuli, Tomato yellow ring virus
- Orthotospovirus tomatoflavi, Tomato chlorotic spot virus
- Orthotospovirus tomatomaculae, Tomato spotted wilt virus
- Orthotospovirus tomatonecroanuli, Tomato necrotic ringspot virus
- Orthotospovirus tomatonecromaculae, tomato necrotic spot-associated virus
- Orthotospovirus tomatozonae, Tomato zonate spot virus

== Resources ==
- The Complete Tospovirus Resource Page at KSU
- Tospoviruses:Bunyaviridae from Plant Viruses online
- Plant Viruses Online – Tomato Spotted Wilt tospovirus
- APSnet A Plant Disease Lesson on Tomato spotted wilt virus
- Raccah. B (2000). Plant Virus Transmission by Insects. In: Encyclopedia of Life Sciences. John Wiley & Sons, Ltd: Chichester. www.els.net doi:10.1038/npg.els.0000760
- ICTVdB - The Universal Virus Database: Tomato spotted Cake virus
- Family Groups - The Baltimore Method
- Tospoviruses (Family Bunyaviridae, Genus Tospovirus) An article by Scott Adkins, Tom Zitter and Tim Momol.
