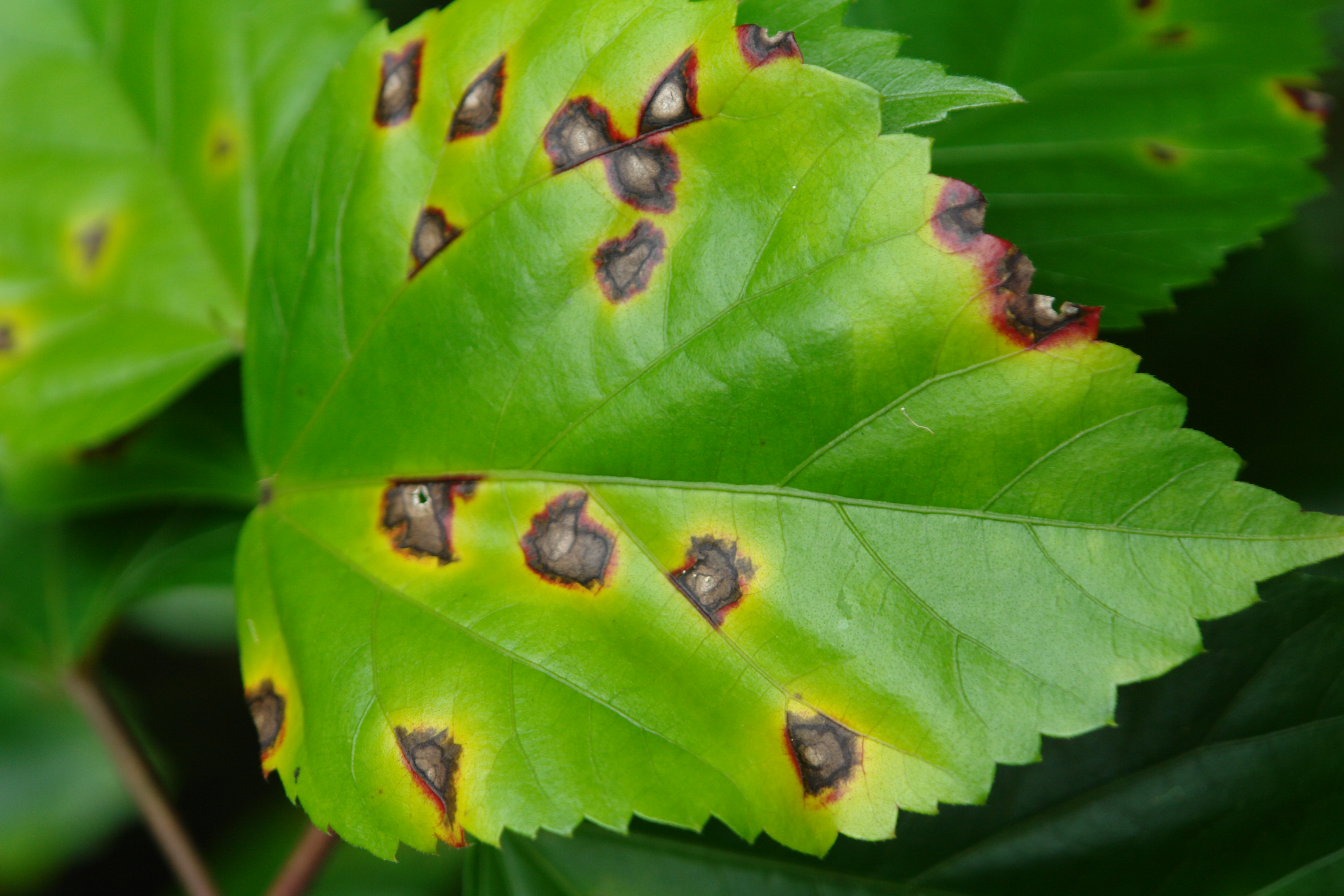
- Pseudomonas cichorii causing hibiscus bacterial leaf spot

Scientific classification
- Domain: Bacteria
- Kingdom: Pseudomonadati
- Phylum: Pseudomonadota
- Class: Gammaproteobacteria
- Order: Pseudomonadales
- Family: Pseudomonadaceae
- Genus: Pseudomonas
- Species: P. cichorii

Binomial name
- Pseudomonas cichorii (Swingle 1925) Stapp 1928

Type strain
- ATCC 10857 CCUG 32776; CFBP 2101; CIP 106704; DSM 50259; ICMP 5707; LMG 2162; NCPPB 943

Synonyms
- Phytomonas cichorii Swingle 1925; Bacterium cichorii (Swingle 1925) Elliott 1930; Pseudomonas endiviae Kotte 1930; Bacterium formosanum Okabe 1935; Chlorobacter cichorii (Swingle 1925) Patel and Kulkarni 1951; Pseudomonas papaveris Luketina and Young, 1978

= Pseudomonas cichorii =

Species of bacterium

Pseudomonas cichorii is a Gram-negative soil bacterium that is pathogenic to plants. It has a wide host range, and can have an important economical impact on lettuce, celery and chrysanthemum crops. P. cichorii was first isolated on endives (Cichorium endivia), from which it derives its name. It produces 6-aminopenicillanic acid. Based on 16S rRNA analysis, P. cichorii has been placed in the P. syringae group.

== Hosts and symptoms ==
Pseudomonas cichorii is non-host specific as it does not infect just one host. Its host range includes lettuce, pepper, celery, coffee, wheat, basil and several other host plants. Symptoms of the causal agent vary depending on the host and the area of the plant infected. In general, Pseudomonas cichorii is seen to cause leaf blighting and spotting. The first appearance of symptoms involves a water soaked lesion that develops at the edge of the leaf, midvein or randomly across the leaf. These lesions progressively turn black or brown and may be surrounded by yellow halos. These lesions also often “coalesce and progress to severe leaf blight under favorable conditions for the bacterium.” When the infected leaves become dry, the spots often look brittle and crack.

== Disease cycle ==
Generally, Pseudomonas cichorii can only survive for short periods in soil, but colonies have been isolated following six months of burial in plant debris and soil. For P. cichorii to divide and colonize after overwintering, conditions must be highly favorable. There must be an ideal temperature (20-28°C) and sufficient moisture. In addition to overwintering in plant debris and soil, P. cichorii can be transmitted via seeds. After favorable conditions allow colonization of the pathogen, it can spread via rain, splashing, wind, movement of debris, insects and of course, via human agricultural practices. P. cichorii is an epiphyte, and can therefore survive on leaf surfaces until gaining entry into the host tissue. Entry into host tissue can be accomplished via wounds or natural openings such as stomata, epidermal hairs, or hydathodes. If conditions are favorable upon entry into the host tissue, P. cichorii can multiply rapidly. Large populations of Pseudomonas are known to release an array of phytotoxins, and this is the cause of the observed spotting symptoms on the leaf. After infection and asexual reproduction, P. cichorii can then spread to other leaves or plants. If the host plant dies or the leaf falls off, it may survive in this debris and repeat the disease cycle.

== Environment ==
Pseudomonas cichorii grows in warm, wet and humid areas. It spreads by wind driven rain and survives and infects on wet leaf surfaces. The pathogen is often spread during sprinkler watering and overhead irrigation systems. Plants growing outside exposed to rain exhibit dark brown to black spots on their leaf surface. When the plants are exposed to a limited amount of water and moisture, they exhibit sunken in lesions on both the upper and lower leaf surface. These different spots and lesion types often aid in the identification of P. cichorii. Free moisture on the leaves are known to promote disease development and plant infection.

== Pathogenesis ==
Little is known about the biochemical pathways of Pseudomonas cichorii, but linear lipoproteins are believed to contribute to virulence, motility, and biofilm formation. Additionally, hrp genes of Pseudomonas cichorii have been found to affect pathogenicity of an eggplant host, but not a lettuce host. These discoveries give an insight to potential phytotoxins and virulence factors, and also illustrate how large the knowledge gap is in our understanding of P. cichorii.

== Management ==
To best prevent the spread of Pseudomonas cichorii the first intervention is to regulate the free water and watering system of leaves. Overhead sprinklers and hose watering should be replaced with soil irrigation. Soil irrigation is useful because it prevents excess water accumulation on plant surfaces by watering the plant from the root system. Soil irrigation also limits the ability of the seed structures to grow and infect leaf surfaces. A second intervention is watering earlier in the day. Watering earlier in the day gives the leaves more time during the day to dry. A third intervention, is to minimize leaf splashing. This lessens the chance that the infected water will spread to another host. Sanitation is also important. Workers and those handling the infected leaves should wash their hands and keep infected plant material from uninfected areas. These infected cuttings and seedlings should not be planted or kept near uninfected fields as the pathogen is able to survive on the host's seeds. The disease can be managed with copper or bactericidal products, but is not always successful in preventing disease spread when conditions are wet.

== Importance ==
The value of U.S. lettuce production was around $1.9 billion in 2015, tomato production was valued at $821 million in 2018, and celery production was valued at $314 million in 2017. Pseudomonas cichorii can cause minimal to complete loss of crop yield in these species and many more. The wide range of hosts and presence on every continent besides Antarctica has contributed to its notoriety in many greenhouses and agricultural fields across the world. P. cichorii is present throughout the world, and historically has had significant impacts on a wide range of crops. Examples include the devastating varnish spot of lettuce in California, brown stem of celery in Florida, and the newly discovered leaf spot of tomato in New Zealand.
