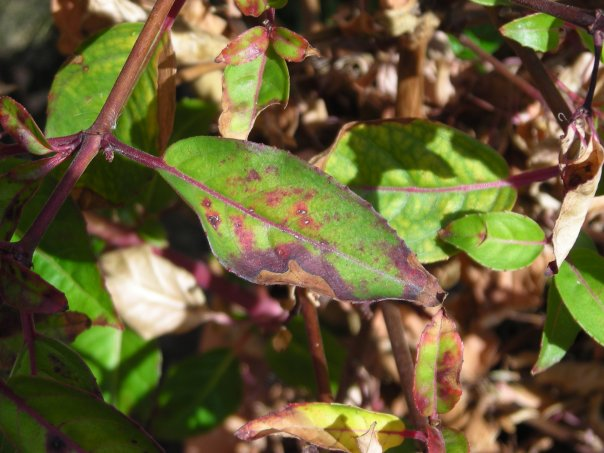
- Impatiens necrotic spot virus on a Fuchsia leaf

Virus classification
- (unranked): Virus
- Realm: Riboviria
- Kingdom: Orthornavirae
- Phylum: Negarnaviricota
- Class: Bunyaviricetes
- Order: Elliovirales
- Family: Tospoviridae
- Genus: Orthotospovirus
- Species: Orthotospovirus impatiensnecromaculae

Synonyms
- Impatiens necrotic spot orthotospovirus

= Impatiens necrotic spot virus =

Species of virus

Impatiens necrotic spot virus (INSV) is a plant pathogenic virus of the genus Orthotospovirus. It was originally believed to be another strain of Tomato spotted wilt virus, but genetic investigations revealed them to be separate viruses. It is a negative-strand RNA virus which has a tripartite genome. It is largely spread by the insect vector of the western flower thrips. The virus infects more than 648 species of plants including important horticultural and agricultural species such as fuchsia, tomato, orchids, and lettuce (especially romaine). As the name implies, the main symptom on plants is necrotic spots that appear on the leaves. The INSV virus infects by injecting the RNA the virus contains into the cell which then starts using the cell resources to transcribe what the virus RNA states. Viral infection can often result in the death of the plant. The disease is mainly controlled by the elimination of the western flower thrip vector and by destroying any infected plant material.

== Disease cycle ==
The disease is an ssRNA that injects itself into the host cell, then has the host cell duplicate the RNA sequence as well as the coat protein used to disguise the RNA. The infected cell also starts to create movement proteins that facilitate the movement of the virus through the plant making the plasmodesmata (connections between plant cells) large enough to allow the virus to move throughout the plant. The virus can then also infect other plants by either the infected sap or a vector, such as an insect, which will start the cycle over again.

== Management ==
Typically the best way to manage a virus problem is to get rid of any vectors that may carry the disease. This easily can be done by an insecticide. Another acceptable method would be resistance plants. These plants would kill off any infected cells, not allowing the virus to spread. Furthermore, larger distance between plants could help slow the spread of the disease by not allowing the virus to be transmitted. This can be done by controlling weeds and thrips, the most common vector transmission. Chemical controls of herbicides and insecticides can be implemented and is the best form of control. If virus remains a problem, other plants can be planted in that area that do not have the traits required for infection of INSV.

== Hosts and symptoms ==
INSV has a wide host range and can be found in over 300 plant species including weeds, fruits, vegetables and ornamental crops. Of these, the most severely affected include tomatoes, lettuce, pepper and peppermint as well as most all ornamentals. Symptoms of infection include a downward curling of the leaves, leaf tip dieback, stunting, necrosis of growing leaf tips, sunken 'chicken pox-like' spots on leaves (often with a surrounding halo), stem death and yellowing. Since these symptoms are so generic, extreme caution must be taken when introducing new plants to your greenhouse. Infected plants can not be cured and not all hosts display visible symptoms.

Western flower thrips are extremely hard to remove from their host plants, as they often dig themselves deep into blossoms, buds and other areas hard to reach with insecticides. So, even if plants are sprayed regularly with insecticide, INSV and other insect vectored viruses can not always be ruled out when forming diagnosis.

Temperature and host both play an important factor when discussing the symptoms which an INSV infected plant will display. When New Guinea Impatiens are cultivated in an environment varying between 75 and 80 degrees Fahrenheit the host plant will be highly symptomatic. However, when New Guinea Impatiens are grown in an environment just 10 degrees cooler, it is unlikely for there to be any observable symptoms of disease.

=== INSV – Lettuce (California, United States of America) ===
In 2006, INSV infected lettuce was first reported in Monterey County. For six years, there were minor to severe outbreaks. However, since 2018, Monterey County has seen severe outbreaks along with other coastal regions, seeing up to almost 100% crop loss. In the last year, INSV has been reported in desert lettuce regions in California (Riverside Counties) and in Arizona. When INSV gets into a lettuce plant, it can get spots and lines of dead tissue on its leaves.

When lettuce is infected with INSV, it shows a number of symptoms, such as yellowing leaves, dead spots, and stunted growth. On the inner leaves there are patterns of necrosis and chlorosis. At the base of the ribs of infected lettuce plants there is significant necrosis and lesions. The necrotic tissue can look brown to dark brown. The symptoms can be different depending on how bad the infection is and how far along the plant is in its growth. Extensive necrosis can cause damaged leaves to become dry and dead. If a plant is infected in its early development stages, its growth may be stunted. The virus can also hurt the quality and yield of lettuce crops.

== Environment ==
INSV is a virus and relies on vector transmission in order to infect and spread to new hosts. This is achieved by insects called western flower thrips. Western flower thrips are native to the western half of North America and are widespread within this natural domain. They are especially prevalent in warmer areas of the mountain west and pose the most notable threat to the popular apple cultivars of the region such as "Granny Smith" and "Ginger Golds." Apple cultivars will show great signs of cosmetic damage including large, dark halos with a central russet. These cosmetic wounds are known as "pansy spots." They are sites where a female has oviposited into developing flower buds or fruitlets. Despite the cosmetic damage suffered by these light skinned apple cultivars they are seemingly unaffected by most thrip vectored viruses. Infested apples of the mountain west simply provide a natural setting for western flower thrips to thrive and reproduce.

Due to the large natural environment and hundreds of hosts, vector transmission allows the virus a range limited only by the reach of the insect. (3) Greenhouses provide ideal environments for western flower thrips and preventative measures must be taken in order to insure healthy plants.

Although western flower thrips were at one time only a pest across the western United States and Canada, their spread has now reached worldwide. They are now considered to be the most serious pest for floricultural plants across much of the world. Females lay anywhere from 150 to 300 eggs during their lifetime, with each offspring having a life of roughly 28 days. The majority of their lives are spent in their adult stage.

== Importance ==
The spread of INSV can be achieved easily through the importation of infected plants. This has been demonstrated in 1991 by its sudden emergence in Portugal, where it was discovered in over 30 plant species. Because of their preference for hidden away living spaces they often travel undetected globally. By raising enzyme-linked immunosorbent assays against the nucleoproteins of symptomatic species, eight isolates have been identified in Italian vegetable and ornamental crops alone. By providing favorable year round conditions, greenhouses allow INSV carrying western flower thrips a permanent residence unless eradicated. INSV can attack 648 different species, being the number one disease in gloxinia and impatiens, and has numerous symptoms often making diagnosis more difficult.
