= Phytophthora nicotianae =

Scientific classification
- Domain: Eukaryota
- Clade: Sar
- Clade: Stramenopiles
- Phylum: Oomycota
- Class: Peronosporomycetes
- Order: Peronosporales
- Family: Peronosporaceae
- Genus: Phytophthora
- Species: P. nicotianae

Binomial name
- Phytophthora nicotianae Breda de Haan, (1896)

Varieties
- Phytophthora nicotianae var. parasitica

Synonyms
- Blepharospora terrestris (Sherb.) Peyronel; Phloeophthora nicotianae (Breda de Haan) G.W.Wilson; Phloeophthora nicotiane (Breda de Haan) G.W.Wilson; Phytophthora allii Sawada; Phytophthora formosana Sawada; Phytophthora imperfecta var. nicotianae Breda de Haan; Phytophthora imperfecta var. nicotianae Breda de Haan ex Sarej.; Phytophthora lycopersici Sawada; Phytophthora manoana Sideris; Phytophthora melongenae Sawada; Phytophthora melongenae subsp. ananaphthoros Sideris; Phytophthora melongenae var. melongenae Sawada, 1915; Phytophthora nicotianae subsp. parasitica (Dastur) G.M.Waterh., 1963; Phytophthora nicotianae var. nicotianae Breda de Haan, 1896; Phytophthora nicotianae var. parasitica (Dastur) G.M.Waterh.; Phytophthora parasitica Dastur; Phytophthora parasitica subsp. nicotianae (Breda de Haan) Tucker; Phytophthora parasitica subsp. rhei G.H.Godfrey, 1923; Phytophthora parasitica var. nicotianae Tucker; Phytophthora parasitica var. piperina Dastur; Phytophthora parasitica var. rhei G.H.Godfrey; Phytophthora ricini Sawada; Phytophthora tabaci Sawada; Phytophthora terrestris Sherb.

Species of single-celled organism

Phytophthora nicotianae or black shank is an oomycete belonging to the order Peronosporales and family Peronosporaceae.

== Hosts and symptoms ==
Phytophthora nicotianae has a broad host range comprising 255 genera from 90 families. Hosts include tobacco, onion, tomato, ornamentals, cotton, pepper, and citrus plants. This pathogen can cause root rot, crown rot, fruit rot, leaf infection, and stem infection. Root rot symptoms are observed on tobacco, poinsettia, tomato, pineapple, watermelon, and as well as African violet. Fruit rots occur on tomato, papaya, and eggplant. Onion shows a leaf and stem infection. In tobacco black shank affects the roots and basal stem area, but all parts of the plant can become infected. Damping off symptoms can be observed in young seedlings. The first above ground symptom that will be observed is the wilting of plants, which leads to stunting. Roots will be blackened and decayed. In final stages of the disease the stem begins to turn black, hence the name black shank. As this happens, tobacco leaves turn brown and become not marketable. Another symptom is disk-like appearance of the pith, although this is not a definitive symptom as it may also be the result of lightning strikes. On onion it causes the disease known as Phytophthora neck and bulb rot. Different stages of onion may be affected. Initially, tips of newly infected plants start to yellow and dry followed by softening of the "neck" of the plants that eventually fall over. Infected leaves may show grey lesions. Roots may become necrotic in late disease.

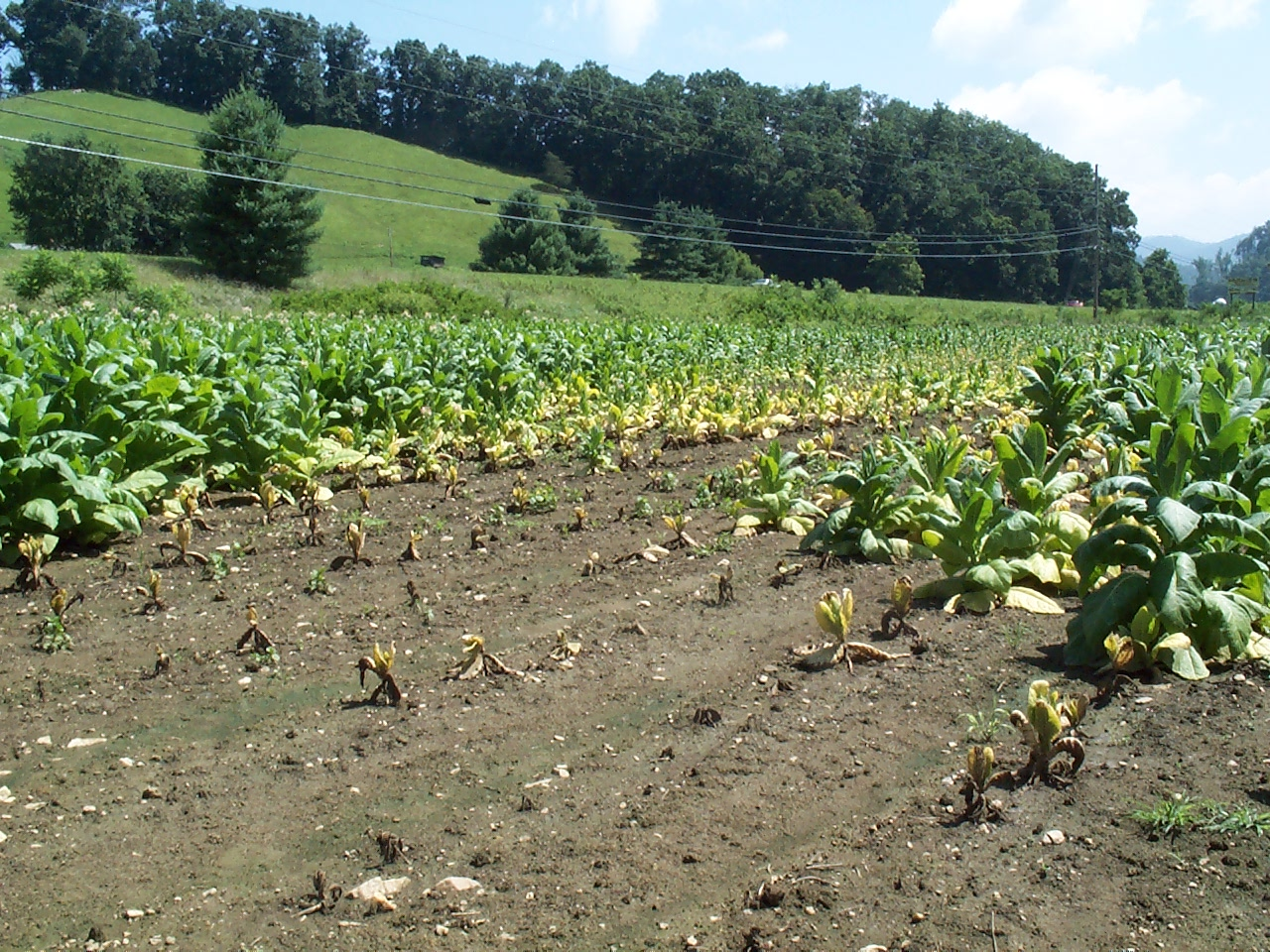
Black shank affecting a field of tobacco

== Disease cycle ==
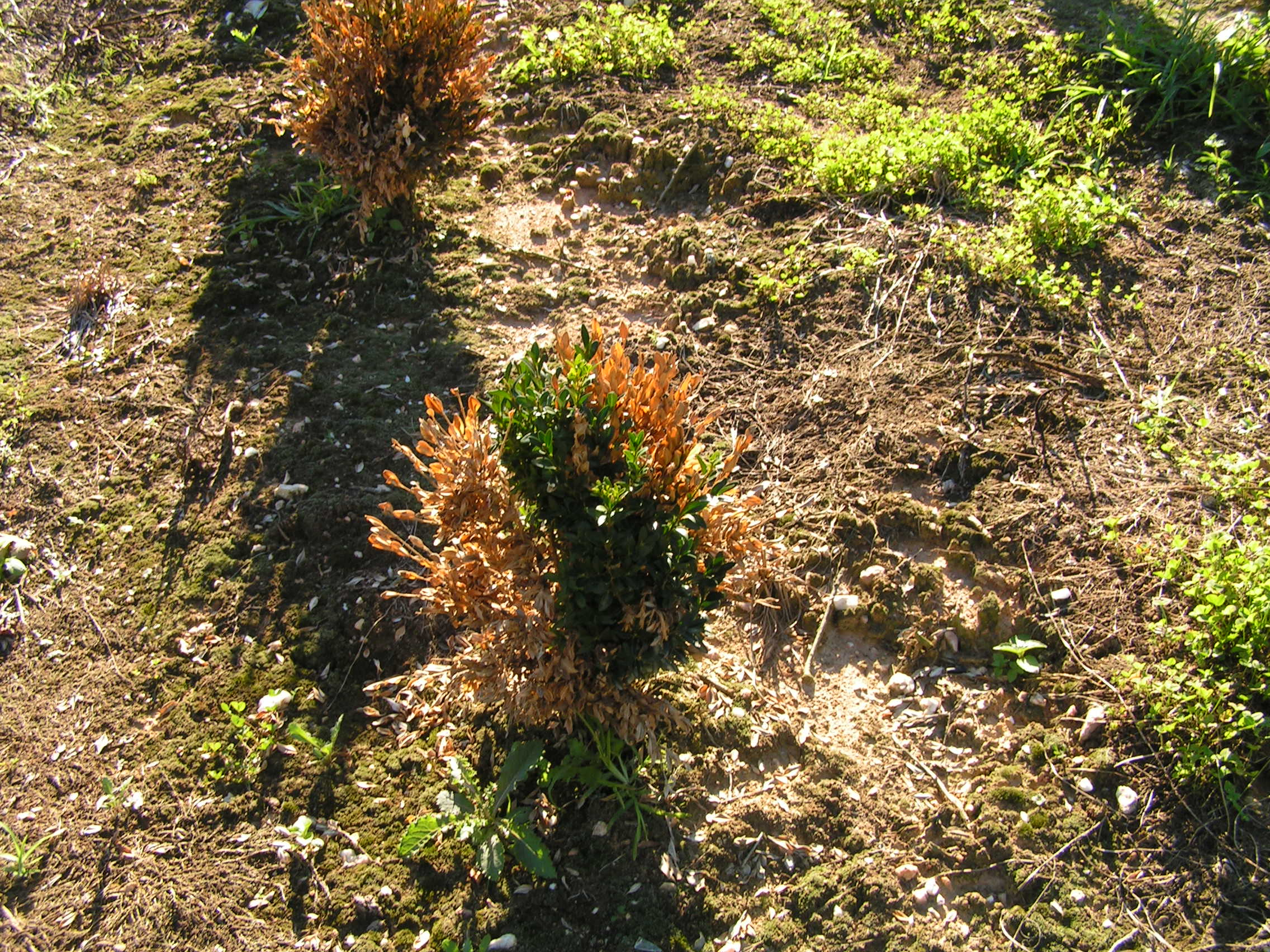
Black shank infection on American boxwood

Black shank is a polycyclic soil borne disease, with the possibility of multiple disease cycles per growing season occurring from May to October. There are important structures this pathogen uses in its disease cycle. Chlamydospores are produced asexually and serve as long lived resting structures, surviving from four to six years. Chlamydospores are the primary survival structure, the primary inoculum, and are usually produced in abundance. These spores germinate in warm and moist soil to produce a germ tube that infects plants or produces a sporangium. Another asexual structure and secondary inoculum, appearing ovoid, pear, or spherical in shape are called sporangium. These spores are produced and can either germinate directly or release motile zoospores within 24 hours of inoculation with the right conditions. Zoospores are kidney shaped with an anterior tinsel flagellum and a posterior whip like flagellum that helps to navigate toward root tips were infection occurs. Black shank needs water for germination and movement because zoospores swim through soil pores and standing water. Splashing water from rain or irrigation can infect healthy plant leaves leading to more repeating secondary cycles. Zoospores move toward nutrient gradients around root tips and host wounds. Once the root surface is contacted, zoospores encyst and a germ tube will emerge penetrating the epidermis. Infection leads to systemic rotting of the root system and wilting and chlorosis in the leaves. Another structure called hyphae is colorless, transparent, and coenocytic, but colonies may yellow with age. Also, there is much morphological variation in colony type with different isolates of P. nicotianae and the growth may differ when grown on different media. The hyphae are heterothallic and require two mating types to produce oospores, the sexual survival structure. Many fields only contain one mating type, so the zoospores rarely germinate and rarely cause epidemics.

== Environment ==
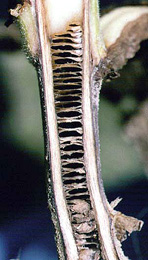
Discing of tobacco pith

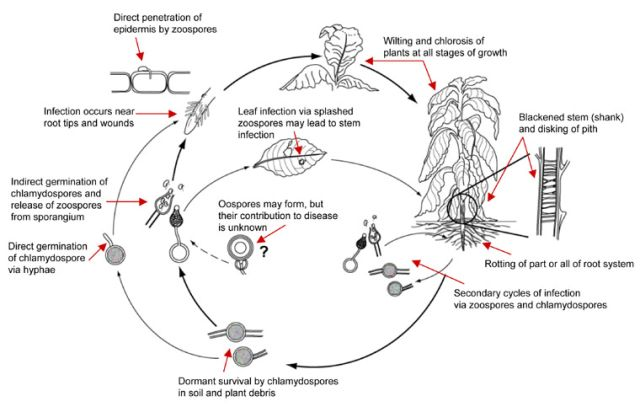
Phytophthora nicotianae disease cycle

This pathogen thrives in temperatures ranging from 84–90 °F (29–32 °C). Disease is prominent in many agricultural productive regions and therefore is a major host to many warm environment crops. Black shank needs water for germination and movement. Saturated soil optimizes disease spread because water is used for dissemination of motile zoospores and sporangia. Low-lying areas of the soil that remain wet for prolonged periods of time will have more disease. Splashing water from rain or irrigation can infect healthy plant leaves leading to more repeating secondary cycles. Soils that are not saturated will lead to little to no disease development, so water management is important. Optimum soil pH for development is between 6 and 7. Levels of calcium and magnesium in the soils can affect disease progress.

== Management ==
Several kinds of management exist for the prevention and suppression of disease. A cultural method that can be effective in preventing disease is sanitation. Equipment should be cleaned after use in infested fields so the disease does not spread into uninfested fields. To disrupt chlamydospore germination crops should be grown in drained disease free soil. Also, avoid transplanting without thorough knowledge of the transplant. To limit spread of structures limit traffic in infected fields and always clean after exposure. Disease is favored by pH values greater than 6.2, so lowering the pH is an effective method for preventing germination. pH management can be difficult when the crop is tobacco because it cannot survive in very low pH soils. Soil pH 5.5 to 6 allow successful growth of tobacco and control of disease.

The cultural control, crop rotation, is very effective at limiting disease. The longer an infected field is planted in a crop other than the initial infected crop, the lower the population will become. A minimum three-year rotation is recommended. Crop rotation is recommended in combination with resistant varieties as genetic controls. Burley tobacco, burley tobacco hybrids, and dark tobacco are varieties of tobacco that are resistant to black shank. Resistance however is not reliable because a single variety has resistance to only a few races of black shank. Finding new lines of resistance is becoming increasingly important due to new discovered resistant races of the pathogen.

Chemical control is most successful if used with resistant varieties. Metalaxyl or mefenoxam are chemistries used to control Phytophthora nicotianae. Ridomil Gold is an example a systemic pesticide with a metalaxyl chemistry. Mefenoxam is twice as active as metalaxyl, but they both have the same mode of action. Successful chemical control is difficult because we are limited to these two chemistries that are basically identical. A study by A. S. Csinos and P. F. Bertrand found out at a rate of 3.36 kg/ha would not inhibit many of the common races used in their study. Overall, from their study they observed that black shank severity was increasing in Georgia due to metalaxyl sensitivity and resistant races of black shank.

== Importance ==
Phytophthora nicotianae has a wide host range, affecting agriculture rich areas all over the world. In the United States this is a major pathogen of ornamentals, tobacco, and tomato. Black shank is one of the most damaging and far reaching diseases of tobacco. In 1896, black shank was first described in Indonesia by Van Breda de Haan. Disease was observed near Georgia in 1915 and reached major tobacco growing areas of Kentucky and North Carolina in the 1930s and 1940s. In North Carolina black shank can be found in every county that grows flue-cured tobacco and currently causes statewide losses of 1 to 2.5 percent per year. This pathogen thrives in warm climates, so it is destructive on crops grown in these areas. During favorable conditions, new generations of spores can be produced every 72 hours, so if this disease is not managed well it can be very destructive. Susceptible cultivars in the right conditions can reach losses of 100 percent, because infected plants do not recover. Less than one propagule per gram of soil can lead to an epidemic.

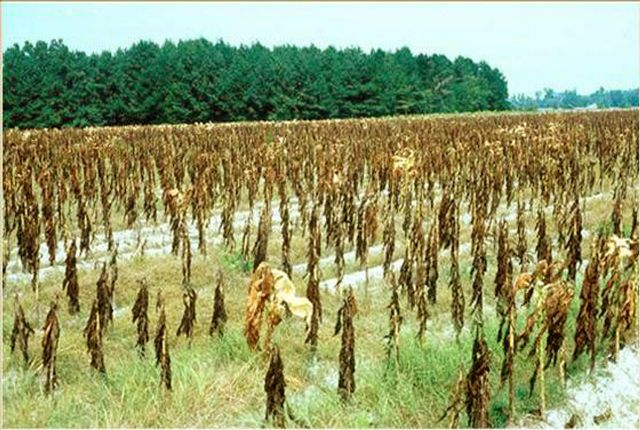
Black shank disease effects

== Pathogenesis ==
This pathogen causes secondary cycles of disease by mode of zoospores. Zoospores interact with the host by sensing and moving toward the nutrient gradients near the root tip and wounds of the plant. Without this means of sensing entry points there would be no secondary cycles of disease. Zoospores, chlamydospores, and sporangia produce a germ tube that directly penetrates the epidermis of the plant. Without this penetration device the pathogen would not be able to infect the plant. The pathogen interferes with transport by infecting the roots. Typically hyphae can be seen in the pith and cause blackening and necrosis. Infection can proceed rapidly once the pathogen has made an entrance into the plant. Once established, further reproduction of both chlamydospores and sporangia will occur within host tissues, amplifying the spread of disease within the host plant and spreading out into nearby plants. Upon death of the host, the decomposing infected tissues will release the pathogen back into the soil, in the form of chlamydospores and zoospores. A resting spore, the chlamydospores are capable of surviving in the soil for years, but it has been noted that cold winters cause an inhibitory effect on the survival rate. This results in less black shank infections where tobacco is grown in cooler, more northern climates.

The action of P. nicotianae is amplified by the presence of root-knot nematodes, which through their own feeding habits, assist the pathogen in finding an entrance to the host. This pathogen synergy with root-knot nematodes has the ability to overcome much of the resistance of cultivars especially bred for P. nicotianae resistance.
