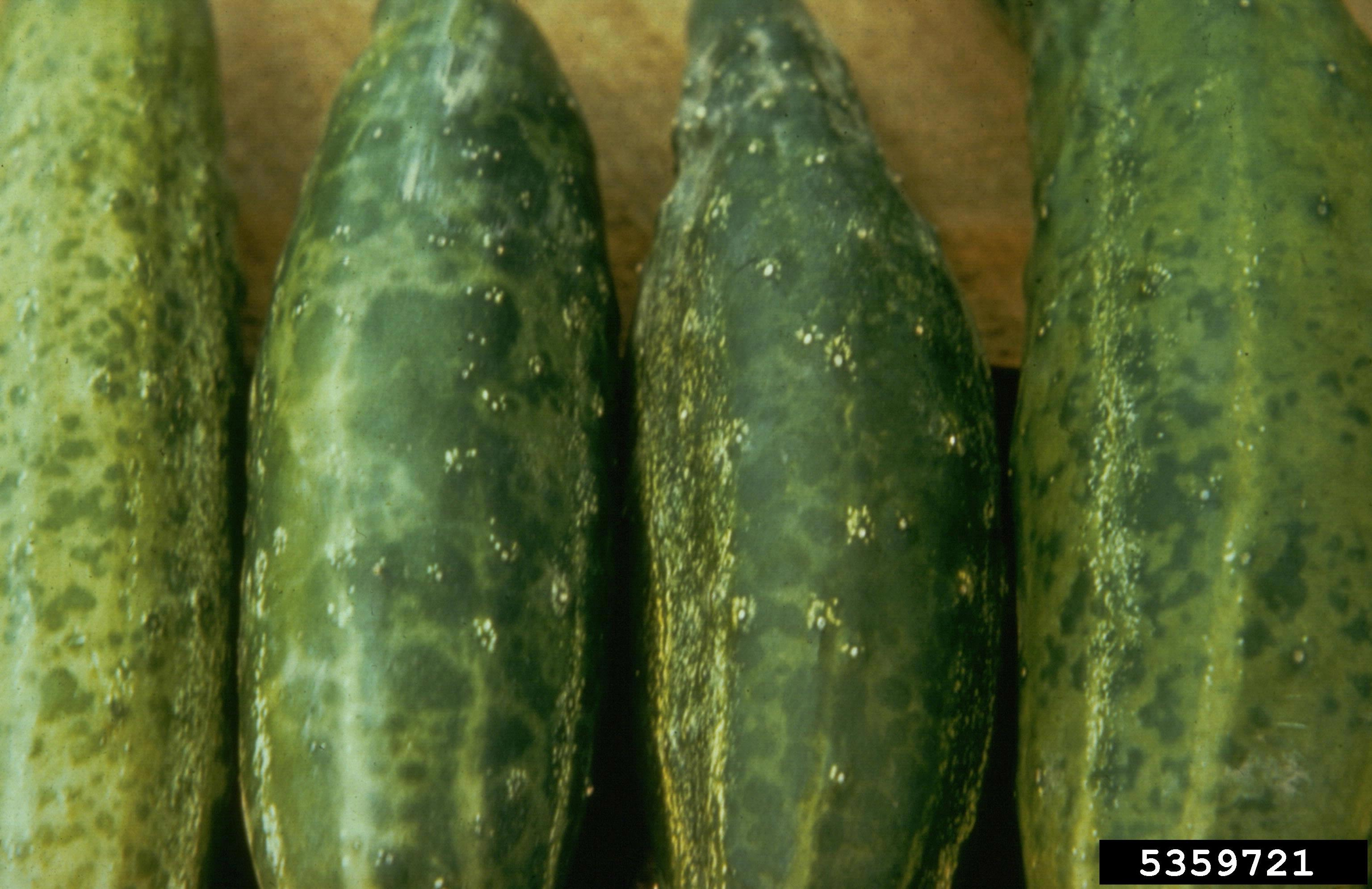
- Cucumber mosaic virus symptoms

Virus classification
- (unranked): Virus
- Realm: Riboviria
- Kingdom: Orthornavirae
- Phylum: Kitrinoviricota
- Class: Alsuviricetes
- Order: Martellivirales
- Family: Bromoviridae
- Genus: Cucumovirus
- Species: Cucumovirus CMV

Synonyms
- banana infectious chlorosis virus; coleus mosaic virus; cowpea banding mosaic virus; cowpea ringspot virus; cucumber virus 1; lily ringspot virus; pea top necrosis virus; peanut yellow mosaic virus; southern celery mosaic virus; soybean stunt virus; spinach blight virus; tomato fern leaf virus; pea western ringspot virus

= Cucumber mosaic virus =

Species of virus

Cucumber mosaic virus (CMV) is a plant pathogenic virus in the family Bromoviridae. This virus has a worldwide distribution and a very wide host range, having the reputation of the widest host range of any known plant virus. It can be transmitted from plant to plant both mechanically by sap and by aphids in a stylet-borne fashion. It can also be transmitted in seeds and by the parasitic weeds, Cuscuta sp. (dodder).

== Hosts and symptoms ==
This virus was first characterized in cucumbers (Cucumis sativus) showing mosaic symptoms in 1934, hence the name Cucumber mosaic. Since then, it has been found to infect a great variety of other plants. These include other vegetables such as squash, melons, peppers, eggplants, tomatoes, beans, carrots, celery, lettuce, spinach, beets, many ornamentals and bedding plants, such as Narcissus, and various weeds. Its presence has been confirmed on every continent of the world, including Antarctica.

Symptoms seen with this virus include leaf mosaic or mottling (Fig. 1), yellowing, ringspots, stunting, and leaf, flower and fruit distortion. CMV also induces a type of symptom on leaves known as the "shoestring" effect on many host species. This effect causes young leaves to appear narrow and the entire plant to be stunted.

Specifically, CMV can cause cucumbers to turn pale and bumpy. The leaves of these plants turn mosaic and their rugosity is often changed, making leaves wrinkled and misshapen. Growth of these plants is usually also stunted and produces few flowers. Often, cucumber fruits are oddly shaped, appear gray, and tasted bitter. These appearances lead to them being referred to as "white pickles".

Tomato plants are usually stunted and have poorly shaped leaves, or "fernleaf", when infected by CMV. Also certain strains of CMV can cause partial or total crop loss. CMV in peppers causes slightly different symptoms than the previously mentioned. Pepper plants often have severe foliar damage, shown as mosaic and necrotic rings. Often the peppers themselves are misshapen and contain chlorotic rings and spots. In celery, CMV causes streaking and spotting and can be often confused with symptoms of the celery mosaic virus. Symptoms of CMV in lettuce, such as chlorosis, plant stunting and often do not properly head, can be very similar to those of lettuce mosaic virus.

CMV has also been identified in a lesser extent to a number of plant species. It is found to be a minor virus infecting Allium crops. The virus infection causes extensive malformation on garlic plants, and mild malformation to severe necrotic streaks on onion leaves. The severe damages on garlic plants and difficulty of aphids transmission of garlic isolate, were possible causal for the rare CMV on garlic. Genetically, the two onion isolates from Turkey (CMV-14.3Po and CMV-15.5Po) are highly similar to others isolated from various plant species in Mediterranean, European, and East Asian countries. CMV was also detected on American beautyberry, an important wildlife and pollinator food source plant native to North America.

In plant tissue this virus makes characteristic viral inclusion bodies which can be diagnostic. They are hexagonal in shape (Fig. 2) and stain both in a protein stain and a nucleic acid stain. The inclusions can also be rhomboidal, may appear hollow (Fig. 2) and can form larger aggregates. The inclusions are not uniformly distributed and can be found in epidermal (Fig. 2), mesophyll, and stomatal cells. These inclusions are made up of virus particles.

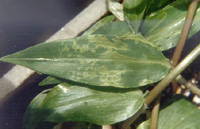
Fig. 1 Symptoms in Commelina diffusa

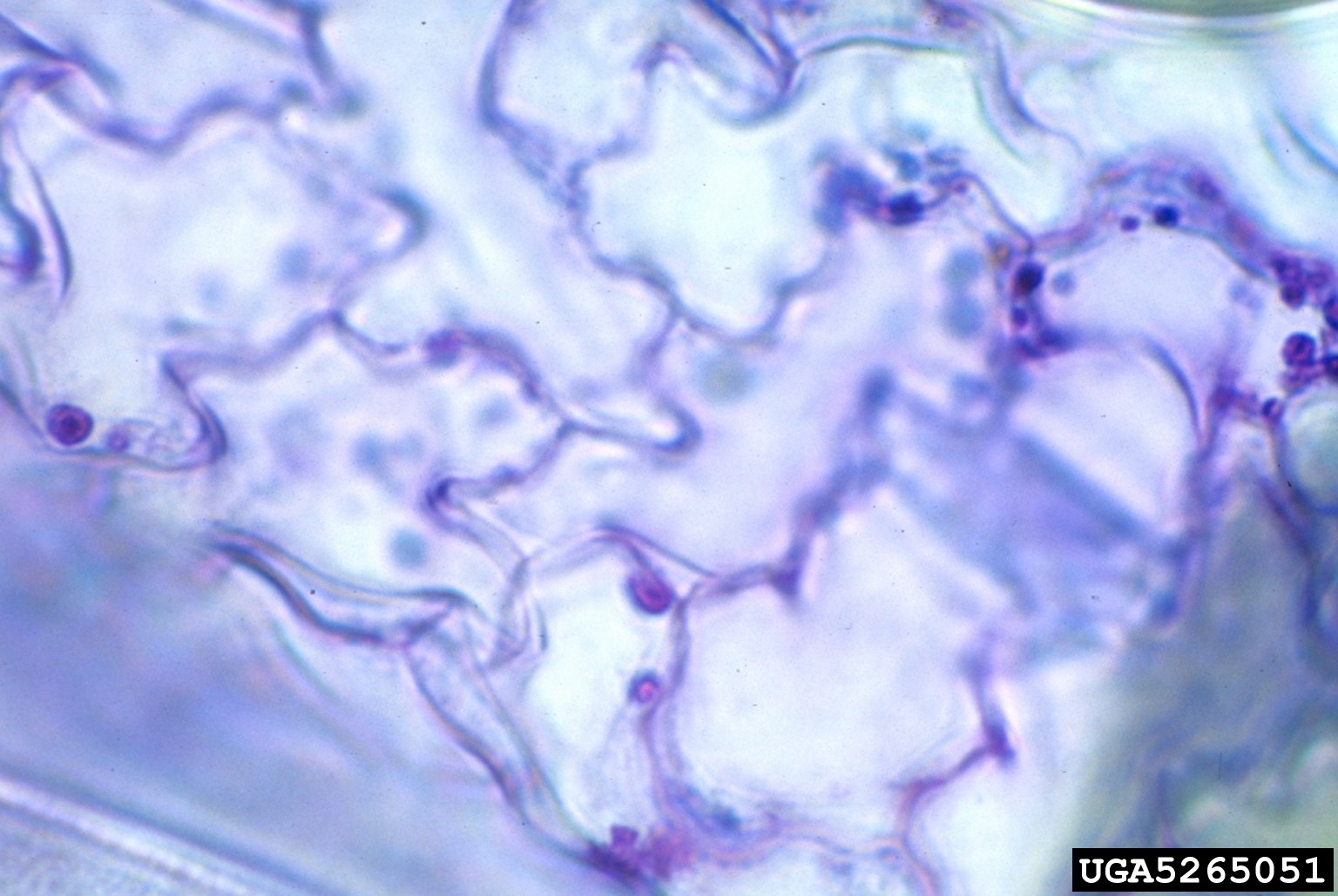
Fig. 2 Cucumber mosaic virus inclusion bodies

== Importance ==
CMV is non-persistently non-circulatively transmitted by more than 80 different aphid species, among other vectors. As consequences, the virus is easily spread, and can be found worldwide. CMV infects over 1200 plant species, including important crops and ornamental species. In its plant host, CMV can induce severe damage, which often lead to economical losses, as it has been proven to cause to 10-20% loss of field yield. A reduction of crop yield can affect mechanisms such as photosynthesis and its ability to provide oxygen to the environment.

== Disease cycle ==
CMV is mainly transmitted by aphids, but it can also be mechanically spread by humans in some cases. However, the mechanically spreading of this virus is not as common as the case of other virus (such as Tobacco Mosaic Virus, TMV), because CMV is not a very stable virus. When it is transmitted by aphids, this virus has an acquisition period of five to ten seconds and an inoculation period of about a minute. Nevertheless, after two minutes, the probability of inoculation largely decreases, and within two hours it is practically impossible to transmit it. Moreover, CMV can overwinter in perennial plants and weeds, as it can survive the winter in the roots of the plant and move to the aerial parts in spring, where it can be transmitted by aphids to other plants.

Once the virus penetrates into the host cell, it releases its RNAs into the host cytoplasm. Then, proteins 1a and 2a are produced to enable the virus replication, which takes place in viral factories, which are subcellular compartments which increase the efficiency of this process. There, a dsRNA genome is synthesized from the ssRNA(+) and transcribed in order to obtain viral mRNAs as well as new ssRNAs. Afterwards, the capsid proteins are produced and the new viral particles are assembled. Finally, the virus is ready to move to a new cell by triggering the formation of tubular structures which mediate the movement of the virions . The short-distance (cell-to-cell) movement of the virus is achieved via plasmodesmata, while the long-distance one (within the plant) occurs via the phloem.

== Properties ==
=== Genome ===
CMV is a linear positive-sense, tripartite single-stranded RNA virus . Its genome size is 8.623 kb and it is divided among RNA1 (3357 bp), RNA2 (3050 bp), and RNA3 (2216 bp), all of which has a tRNA-like structure . These three RNAs encode five proteins, proteins 1a, 2a, 2b, movement protein (MP) and coat protein (CP). While proteins 1a and 2a are responsible for the replication of the virus, protein 2b is the host-silencing suppressor. The RNA is surrounded by a protein coat consisting of 32 copies of a single structural protein which form isometric particles.

=== Virion ===
This virus presents non-enveloped, icosahedral or bacilliform virions of 26-35 nm in diameter. The different RNAs are encapsidated in distinct particles, which results in a variety of virions .The virus is made of 180 subunits that are composed of single capsid proteins and single stranded positive RNA. The different RNAs such as satellite RNA are linked to expressing the virus. Cucumber mosaic virus affects plant species where it infects them and rapidly mutates, causing difficulties in treatments attributable to its constant mutations, host range, and resistance.

=== Environment ===
CMV is naturally found in temperate areas, where aphids, one of its main vectors, are also found. In addition to its presence in temperature areas, this virus can also be found in more tropical climate zones. Areas such as these include California, Spain, Italy, and parts of Eastern Asia.

=== Diagnosis ===
Plants have physical implications of being affected by this virus. A series of yellow or green pigmentation can appear predominantly in the leaves of the plant. Leaf malformation, plant necrosis, plant growth inhibition, and altered fruit quality are all characteristics of plants with this virus.

The presence of this virus in a plant can be confirmed serologically (ELISA), molecularly (PCR), or by host range tests. These tests can be done to determine the amount of or the presence of the virus on the plants. Biological assays can also be performed to determine the specific variants of CMV affecting the plant.

=== Management ===
This virus can negatively affect the health and sustainability of agriculture such as crops like tomatoes, peppers, and lettuce. Currently there is no chemical capable of removing this virus from an infected plant, and therefore the best control is through prevention of the infection and eradication. To achieve this, it is crucial to remove weeds and diseased plants from the field, as well as use clean and sanitized tools. Other options are the use of resistant varieties, or planting so-called "trap crops".

== Bibliography ==
- IWAKI, Mitsuro; KOMURO, Yasuo (1972). "Viruses Isolated from Narcissus (Narcissus spp.) in Japan". Japanese Journal of Phytopathology. 38 (2): 137–145. doi:10.3186/jjphytopath.38.137.

Other on-line Links about CMV for growers and gardeners

1. Texas Plant Disease Handbook: Cucumber Mosaic
2. Weekend Gardener: Cucumber mosaic virus
3. Ohio Floriculture:

Cucumber mosaic virus
