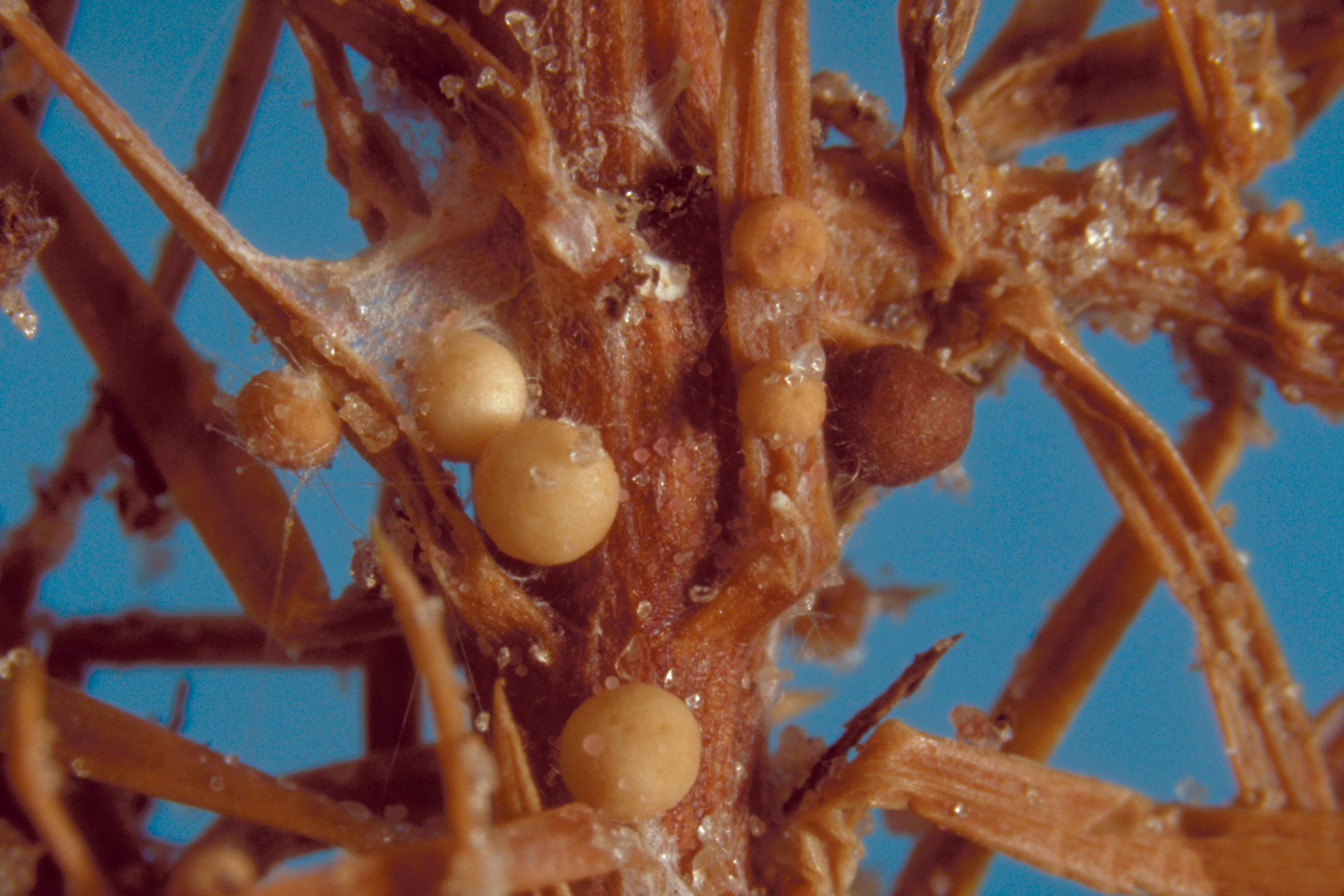
- Sclerotia at base of foliage of eastern redcedar

Scientific classification
- Kingdom: Fungi
- Division: Basidiomycota
- Class: Agaricomycetes
- Order: Amylocorticiales
- Genus: Agroathelia
- Species: A. rolfsii

Binomial name
- Agroathelia rolfsii (Sacc.) Redhead & S-T. Mullineux

Synonyms
- Athelia rolfsii (Sacc.) C.C. Tu & Kimbrough; Corticium rolfsii (Sacc.) Curzi; Pellicularia rolfsii (Sacc.) E. West; Botryobasidium rolfsii (Sacc.) Venkatar. Sclerotium rolfsii anamorph Sacc.

= Agroathelia rolfsii =

Pathogen fungus

Agroathelia rolfsii is a corticioid fungus in the order Amylocorticiales. It is a facultative plant pathogen and is the causal agent of "southern blight" disease in crops.

== Taxonomy ==
The species was first described in 1911 by Italian mycologist Pier Andrea Saccardo, based on a specimen collected by Peter Henry Rolfs, sent by John A. Stevenson at the US national mycological collection. Rolfs first considered the unnamed fungus to be the cause of tomato blight in Florida and subsequently caused diseases on multiple hosts. The specimens sent to Saccardo were sterile, consisting of hyphae and sclerotia. Saccardo placed the species in the old form genus Sclerotium, naming it Sclerotium rolfsii. It is, however, not a species of Sclerotium in the modern sense.

In 1932, Mario Curzi discovered that the teleomorph (spore-bearing state) was a corticioid fungus and accordingly placed the species in the genus Corticium. Uncertainty on its classification when the broadly defined genus Corticium was being partitioned by taxonomists, led to placement in Pellicularia, then Botryobasidium and finally Athelia. Subsequently, it has been shown via phylogenetic analyses of DNA sequences, that Agroathelia rolfsii was a member of the Amylocorticiales and not the Atheliales where it was classified until recently.

== Description ==
The fungus produces effused basidiocarps (fruiting bodies) that are smooth and white. Microscopically, they consist of ribbon-like hyphae with clamp connections. Basidia are club-shaped, bearing four smooth, ellipsoid basidiospores, measuring 4–7 by 3–5 μm. Small, brownish sclerotia (hyphal propagules) are also formed, arising from the hyphae.

== Diseases ==
=== Southern blight ===
Agroathelia rolfsii occurs in soil as a saprotroph, but can also attack living plants. It has an almost indiscriminate host range, but its capacity to form sclerotia (propagules that remain in the soil) means that it particularly attacks seasonal crops. It mostly occurs in warm soils (above 15 °C (59 °F)) and can be a serious pest of vegetables in tropical and subtropical regions (including Florida, where it was first recognized), causing "southern blight".

=== Mustard seed fungus ===
It can also be called mustard seed fungus.

=== Root rot ===
Causes a root rot of Cassava.

== Disease cycle ==
The soil-borne fungal pathogen Agroathelia rolfsii is a basidiomycete that typically exists only as mycelium and sclerotia (anamorph: Sclerotium rolfsii, or asexual state). It causes the disease Southern Blight and typically overwinters as sclerotia. The sclerotia is a survival structure composed of a hard rind and cortex containing hyphae and is typically considered the primary inoculum. The pathogen has a very large host range, affecting over 500 plant species (including tomato, onion, snapbean and pea) in the United States of America. The fungus attacks the host crown and stem tissues at the soil line by producing a number of compounds such as oxalic acid, in addition to enzymes that are pectinolytic and cellulolytic. These compounds effectively kill plant tissue and allow the fungus to enter other areas of the plant. After gaining entry, the pathogen uses the plant tissues to produce mycelium (often forming mycelial mats), as well as additional sclerotia. Sclerotia formation occurs when conditions are especially warm and humid, primarily in the summer months in the United States of America. Susceptible plants exhibit stem lesions near the soil line, and thus often wilt and eventually die. Infection caused by Southern Blight is not considered systemic.

== Environment ==
Agroathelia rolfsii typically prefers warm, humid climates (whence the name of the disease, Southern Blight) which is required for optimal growth (i.e. to produce mycelium and sclerotia). This makes the disease an important issue in regions such as the Southern United States of America, especially for solanaceous crops. In addition, oxygen rich and acidic soils have also been found to favor growth of the pathogen. Southern Blight can be spread (by way of sclerotia and mycelium) by contaminated farm tools and implements, irrigation systems and infected soil and plant material.

== Management ==
Thus, management of the disease is critical, especially in agricultural regions. Although historically management has been difficult, there are several practical ways to reduce disease pressure. Simply avoiding infected fields is perhaps the most straightforward management technique given the large host range and durability of survival structures (i.e. sclerotia). However, when this is not possible, practicing proper sanitation and implementing effective crop rotations can help. Deep tillage has also been shown to reduce Southern Blight occurrence by burying infected plant tissues and creating an anaerobic environment that hinders pathogen growth. Soil solarization and certain organic amendments (e.g. composted chicken manure and rye-vetch green manure), as well as introducing certain Trichoderma spp. have also been shown to reduce plant death and number of sclerotia produced in the field in tomatoes. In addition to these cultural methods, chemical methods (e.g. fungicides) can also be employed. These methods all disrupt the production of mycelium and sclerotia, thus reducing the spread of disease.

== See also ==
- List of soybean diseases
