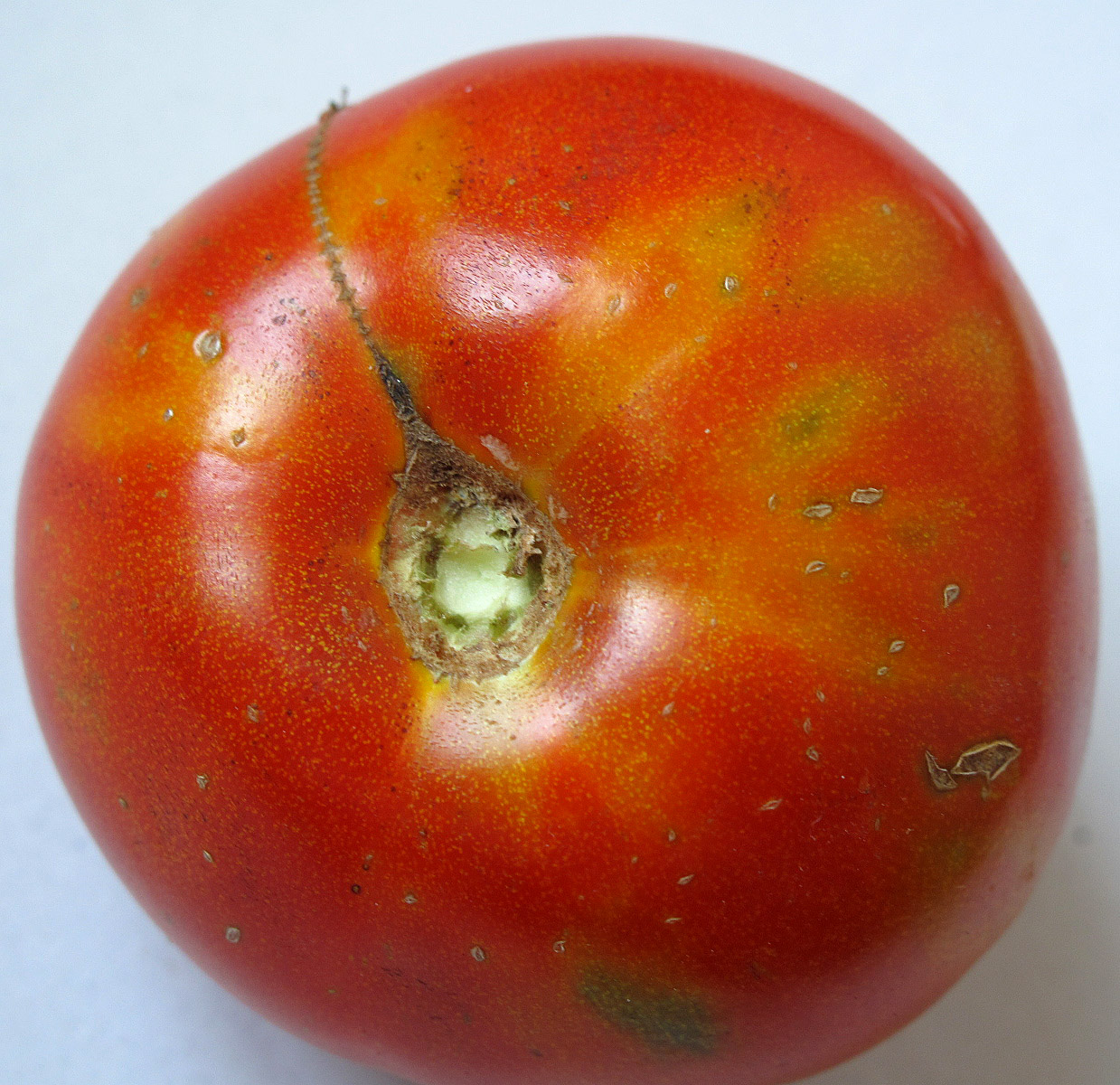
- Symptoms of Tomato spotted wilt virus on tomato

Virus classification
- (unranked): Virus
- Realm: Riboviria
- Kingdom: Orthornavirae
- Phylum: Negarnaviricota
- Class: Bunyaviricetes
- Order: Elliovirales
- Family: Tospoviridae
- Genus: Orthotospovirus
- Species: Orthotospovirus tomatomaculae

Synonyms
- Tomato spotted wilt orthotospovirus; Tomato spotted wilt tospovirus

= Tomato spotted wilt virus =

Species of virus

Tomato spotted wilt virus (TSWV) is a spherical negative-sense RNA virus. Transmitted by thrips, it causes serious losses in economically important crops and it is one of the most economically devastating plant viruses in the world.

== Transmission and lifespan ==
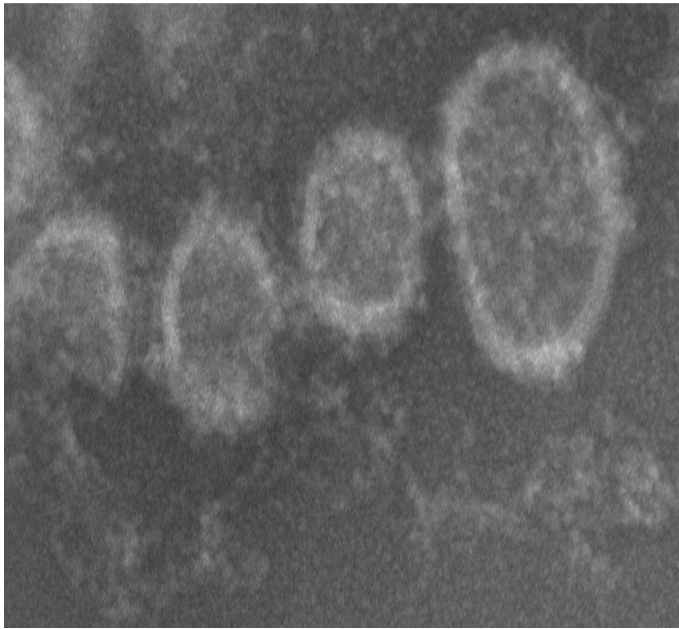
Transmission electron micrograph of tomato spotted wilt virus

The circulative propagative transmission of TSWV is carried out by at least 10 different species of thrips. The most common species is Frankliniella occidentalis (western flower thrips) as it is the vector that predominantly transmits TSWV globally and in greenhouses. The rapid developmental and reproductive rate of the thrips contributes to the spread of TSWV. The time needed for insects to acquire the virus (acquisition period) and the time needed for the virus to move from the insect to the plant (inoculation) for TSWV varies depends on the vector species. For F. occidentalis, the acquisition and inoculation of TSWV can be as short as 5 minutes. However, the acquisition and inoculation periods for optimal transmission is 21.3 hours and 42.7 hours, respectively.

Transmission of TSWV can only occur when larval-stage thrips acquire TSWV. The larval stage for thrips lasts around 1–3 days. TSWV is acquired by thrips when they feed on infected plants. Adult thrips cannot be infected with TSWV, as their midgut barrier successfully prevents infection. However, thrips that have successfully become infected with TSWV in the larval stage can transmit the virus throughout their lifetimes. To protect their eggs, thrips insert them into various types of plant tissue - eggs can be found in the stems, leaves, or flowers of plants. Thrips hatch in 2–3 days and complete their lifecycle in 20–30 days. Adult thrips feed on the flower bud, stem, and leaf parts of the plant.

== Hosts and symptoms ==
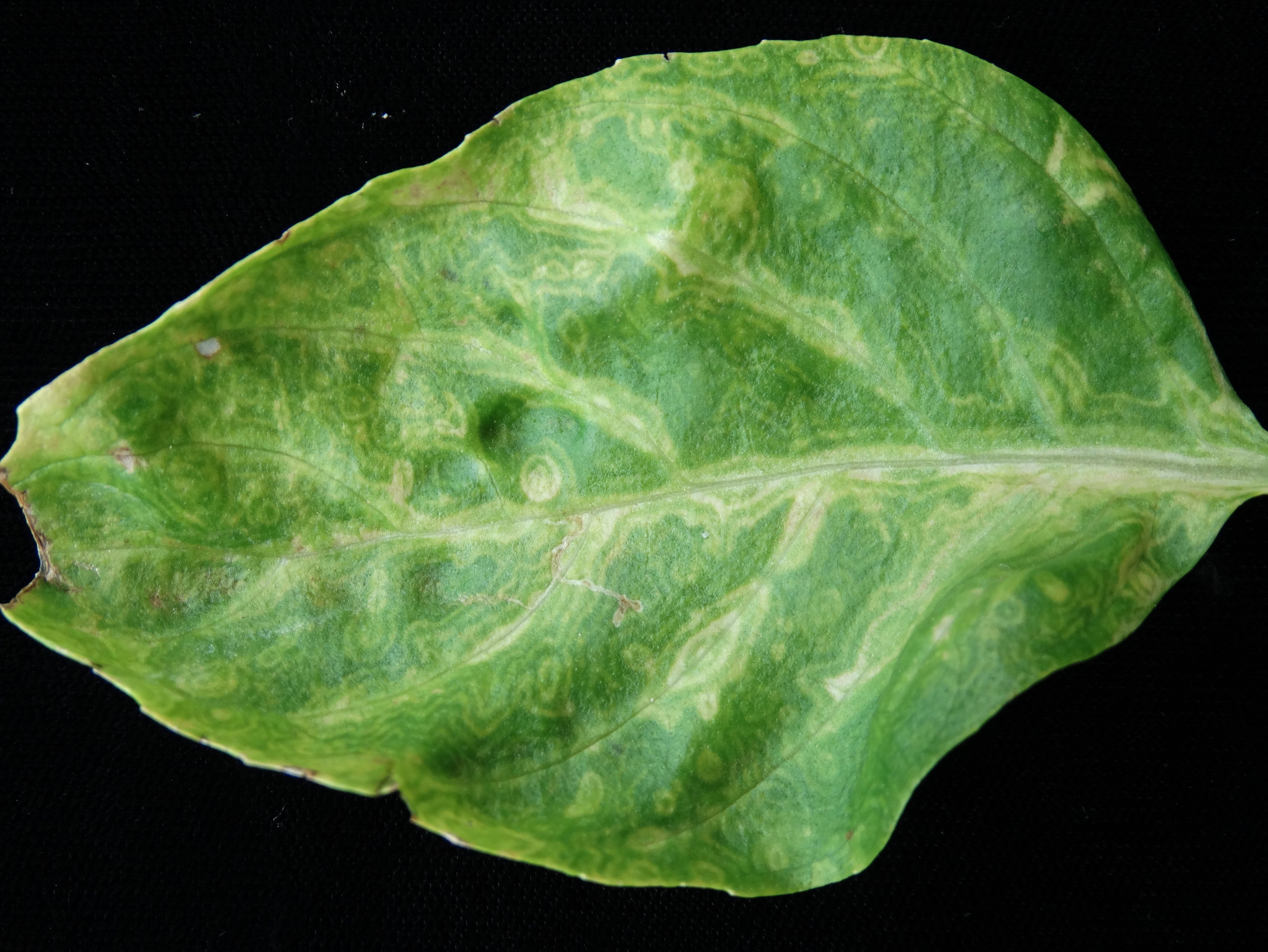
Symptoms of tomato spotted wilt virus on basil

TSWV infects a variety of hosts, contributing to its global economic impact on crops. Over 1000 different hosts are susceptible to TSWV. The host range of TSWV includes agronomically important crops such as tomatoes and tobacco. The symptoms of TSWV vary from host to host. There is also variability of symptoms within a single type of host due to the age of the plant, nutrition and the environment (especially temperature). Common symptoms include stunting, spots on leaves, purple veins on leaves, wilting, and discoloration and incomplete ripening of fruit. Many different strains of TSWV are known, and differences in symptoms may also be attributed to the differences in the number of strains present.

== Genome, phylogeny, and evolution ==
TSWV is a spherical, negative-sense, RNA virus that has a diameter between 80 and 110 nanometers. TSWV tripartite genomes are named RNAs L (8.9 kb), M (4.8 kb), and S (2.9 kb). The RNA S has two genes that encode nucleocapsid (N) and nonstructural protein (NSs).

p202/3WT, Tarquinia, and p105 isolates were always positioned in three different lineages according to phylogenetic analysis based on full genome, RdRp, GcGn, NSm, N, and NSs genes. TSWV isolates from worldwide shared high nucleotide and amino acid identities in N gene region. Additionally, the highly conserved N gene was found to be under very strong negative selection pressures with estimated dN/dS values = 0.0638 and 0.0557.

== Management ==
Prevention is key in managing TSWV. Once a plant becomes infected with TSWV, no practical ways are known to cure the virus-infected plant. The most efficient method of containing this disease is genetic resistance. Several different resistance genes have been identified in multiple crops. In some crops, the resistance genes have been effective, but in others, some strains of TSWV have been discovered to overcome the resistance gene, such as the Sw-5 resistance gene in tomato. The Sw-5 resistance gene in tomato is a dominant resistant gene. The Sw-5 gene gives resistance to the TSWV through a hypersensitive response. A hypersensitive response is when the plant cells that surround the infection undergo cell death, which would then deprive the virus of the cell machinery it needs to replicate and infect the plant further. Several strains of TSWV have been detected in countries such as Australia, Spain, and the United States that can overcome the Sw-5-resistant gene. However, those strains of TSWV have not been spread worldwide, so the Sw-5 gene is still useful.

Other important prevention techniques include buying virus- and thrips-free transplants and managing thrips populations. Introducing species that naturally prey on thrips, such as the minute pirate bugs (Orius insidiosus) and big-eyed bugs (Geocoris punctipes), may help reduce transmission of TSWV. Insecticides are not an efficient way to decrease the vector population because the vectors rapidly develop resistance. Removing weeds and infected plants is a good way to prevent more infections in the greenhouse. Sanitation practices such as the destruction or removal of old crops by plowing or physical removal are often used in the field.
