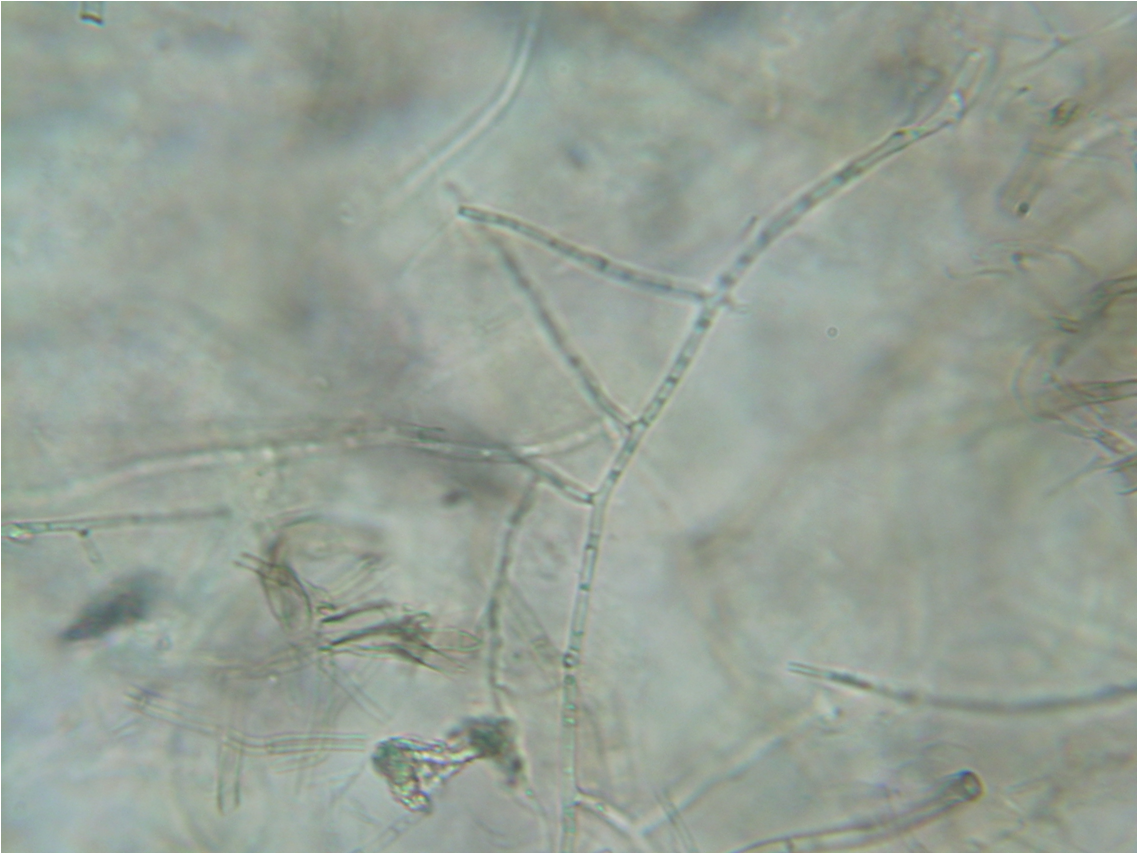
- Microscopic image of Rhizoctonia solani hyphae showing typical right-angled branching

Scientific classification
- Kingdom: Fungi
- Division: Basidiomycota
- Class: Agaricomycetes
- Order: Cantharellales
- Family: Ceratobasidiaceae
- Genus: Rhizoctonia
- Species: R. solani

Binomial name
- Rhizoctonia solani J.G. Kühn, 1858

Synonyms
- Moniliopsis solani (J.G. Kühn) R.T. Moore 1987

= Rhizoctonia solani =

Species of fungus

Rhizoctonia solani is a species of fungus in the order Cantharellales. Basidiocarps (fruit bodies) are thin, effused, and web-like, but the fungus is more typically encountered in its anamorphic state, as hyphae and sclerotia. The name Rhizoctonia solani is currently applied to a complex of related species that await further research. In its wide sense, Rhizoctonia solani is a facultative plant pathogen with a wide host range and worldwide distribution. It causes various plant diseases such as root rot, damping off, and wire stem. It can also form mycorrhizal associations with orchids.

== Taxonomy ==
In 1858, the German plant pathologist Julius Kühn observed and described a fungus on diseased potato tubers and named it Rhizoctonia solani, the species epithet referring to Solanum tuberosum (potato). The disease caused was well known before the discovery and description of the fungus. In 1956, Dutch mycologist M.A. Donk published the new name Thanatephorus cucumeris for the spore-bearing teleomorph of R. solani, based on the species Hypochnus cucumeris originally described from diseased cucumbers in Germany.

Subsequent research has shown that Rhizoctonia solani is a complex of related species. This was originally based on observing hyphal anastomosis (or lack of it) in paired isolates grown in culture. Successful anastomosis indicated that the isolates were genetically similar, whilst unsuccessful anastomosis indicated they were dissimilar and distinct. As a result Rhizoctonia solani has been split into at least 25 different "anastomosis groups" (AGs) and sub-groups. These AGs tend to be associated with different plant diseases.

Molecular research, based on cladistic analysis of DNA sequences, has largely supported the division of R. solani into AGs.

Following changes to the International Code of Nomenclature for algae, fungi, and plants, the practice of giving different names to teleomorph and anamorph forms of the same fungus was discontinued, meaning that Thanatephorus became a synonym of the earlier name Rhizoctonia. In its current sense, therefore, Rhizoctonia solani includes both anamorphic and teleomorphic forms of the fungus. Thanatephorus cucumeris is part of the R. solani species complex, but since it is based on a different type species, it may not be a synonym of R. solani sensu stricto.

== Hosts and symptoms ==
Rhizoctonia solani sensu lato causes a wide range of commercially significant plant diseases. It is one of the fungi responsible for brown patch (a turfgrass disease), damping off (e.g. in soybean seedlings), black scurf of potatoes, bare patch of cereals, root rot of sugar beet, belly rot of cucumber, banded leaf and sheath blight in maize, sheath blight of rice, and many other pathogenic conditions. The fungus, therefore, has a wide host range and strains of R. solani may differ in the hosts they are able to infect, the virulence of infection, selectivity for a given host (which may range from nonpathogenic to highly virulent), the temperature at which infection occurs, the ability to develop in lower soil levels, the ability to form sclerotia, the growth rate, and survival in a certain area. These factors may not always be distinctive in every host that Rhizoctonia attacks or in every strain thereof.

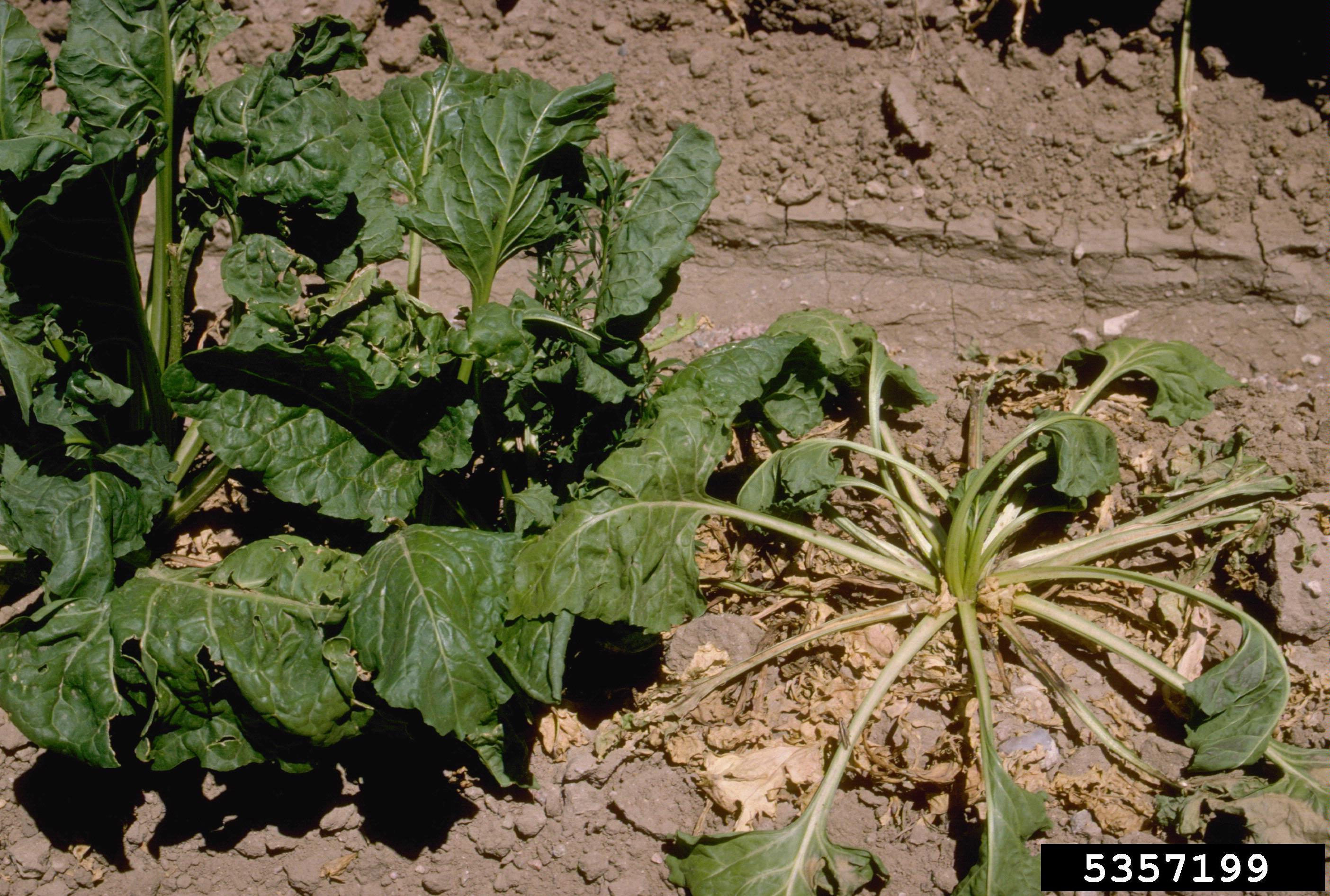
R. solani causing crown rot infection on Beta vulgaris, common beet

R. solani primarily attacks seeds of plants below the soil surface, but can also infect pods, roots, leaves, and stems. The most common symptom of Rhizoctonia is "damping off", or the failure of infected seeds to germinate. R. solani may invade the seed before it has germinated to cause this pre-emergent damping off, or it can kill very young seedlings soon after they emerge from the soil. Seeds that do germinate before being killed by the fungus have reddish-brown lesions and cankers on stems and roots.

Various environmental conditions put plants at higher risk of infection. The pathogen prefers warmer, wet climates for infection and growth. Seedlings are most susceptible to disease in their early stages.

Cereals in regions of England, South Australia, Canada, and India experience losses caused by R. solani every year. Roots are killed back, causing plants to be stunted and spindly. Other non-cereal plants in those regions can experience brown stumps as another symptom of the pathogen. R. solani can also cause hypocotyl and stem cankers on mature plants of tomatoes, potatoes, and cabbages. Strands of mycelium and sometimes sclerotia appear on their surfaces. Roots turn brown and die after a period of time. The best known symptom of R. solani is black scurf on potato tubers, the scurf being the sclerotia of the fungus.

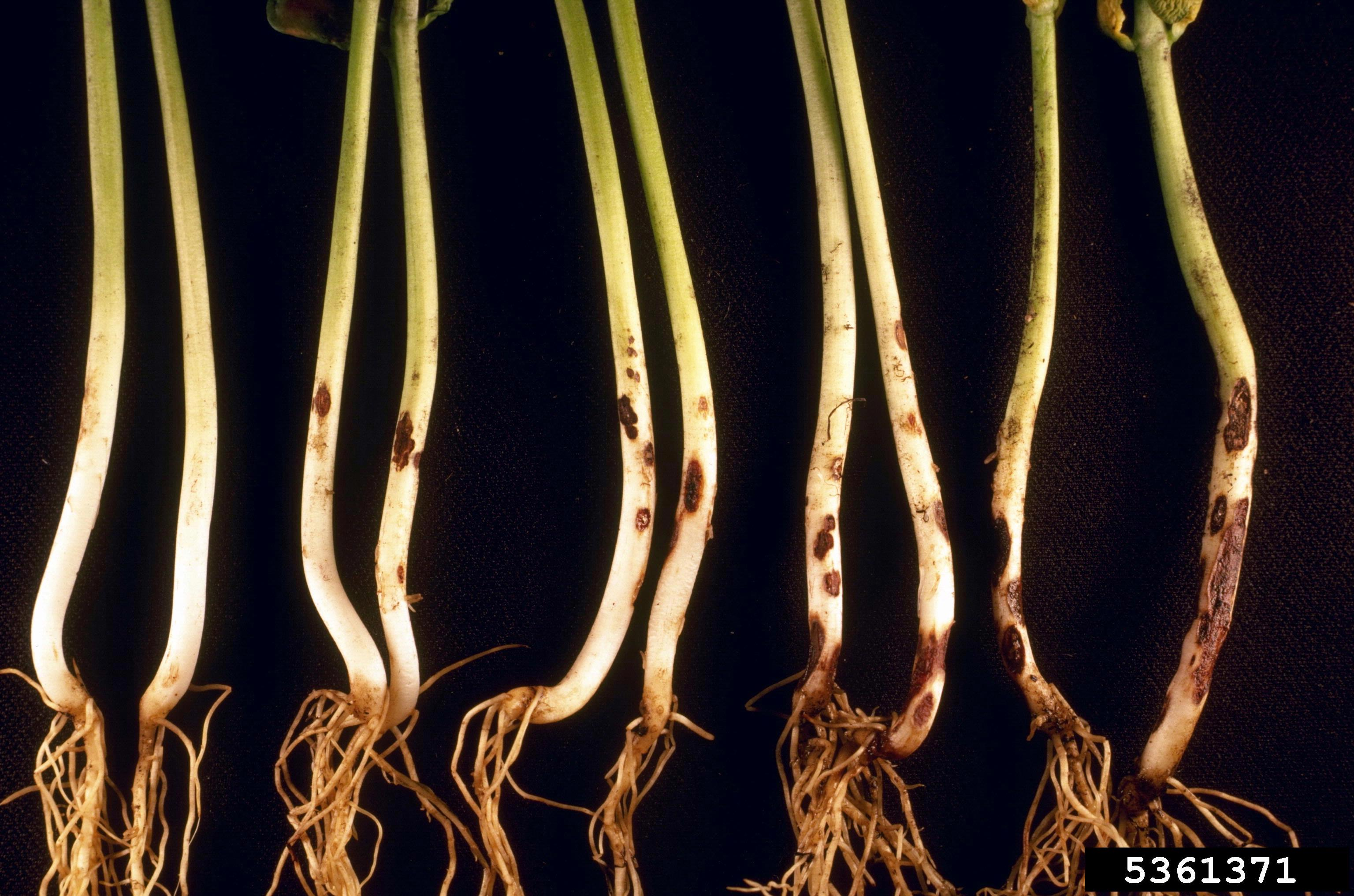
Symptoms on common beans, Rhizoctonia damping off, blight, and rot

== Disease cycle ==
Rhizoctonia solani can survive in the soil for many years in the form of sclerotia. Sclerotia of Rhizoctonia have thick outer layers to allow for survival, and they function as the overwintering structure for the pathogen. In some rare cases (such as the teleomorph) the pathogen may also take on the form of mycelia that reside in the soil, as well. The fungus is attracted to the plant by chemical stimuli released by a growing plant and decomposing plant residue. The process of penetration of a host can be accomplished in a number of ways. Entry can occur through direct penetration of the plant cuticle/epidermis or by means of natural openings in the plant. Hyphae come in contact with the plant and attach to the plant by which through growth they begin to produce an appressorium which penetrates the plant cell and allows for the pathogen to obtain nutrients from the plant cell. The pathogen can also release enzymes that break down plant cell walls, and continues to colonize and grow inside dead tissue. This breakdown of the cell walls and colonization of the pathogen within the host forms the sclerotia. New inoculum is produced on or within the host tissue, and a new cycle is repeated when new plants become available. The disease cycle begins as such:

1. Sclerotia/mycelium overwinter in plant debris, soil, or host plants.
2. The young hyphae and fruiting basidia (rare) emerge and produce mycelia and rarely basidiospores.
3. The very rare production of the germinating basidiospores penetrate the stoma, whereas the mycelia land on the plant surface and secrete the necessary enzymes onto the plant surface to initiate invasion of the host plant.
4. After the mycelia successfully invade the host, necrosis and sclerotia form in and around the infected tissue which then leads to the various symptoms associated with the disease, such as soil rot, stem rot, damping off, etc. and the process begins all over again.

== Environment ==
The pathogen is known to prefer warm, wet weather, and outbreaks typically occur in the early summer months. Most symptoms of the pathogen do not occur until late summer, thus most farmers do not become aware of the diseased crop until harvest. A combination of environmental factors has been linked to the prevalence of the pathogen, such as presence of host plant, frequent rainfall/irrigation, and increased temperatures in spring and summer. In addition, poor drainage of the soil (whether caused by parent soil texture, or by compaction) is also known to create favorable environments for the pathogen. The pathogen is dispersed as sclerotia, and these sclerotia can travel by means of wind, water, or soil movement between host plants.

== Identification ==
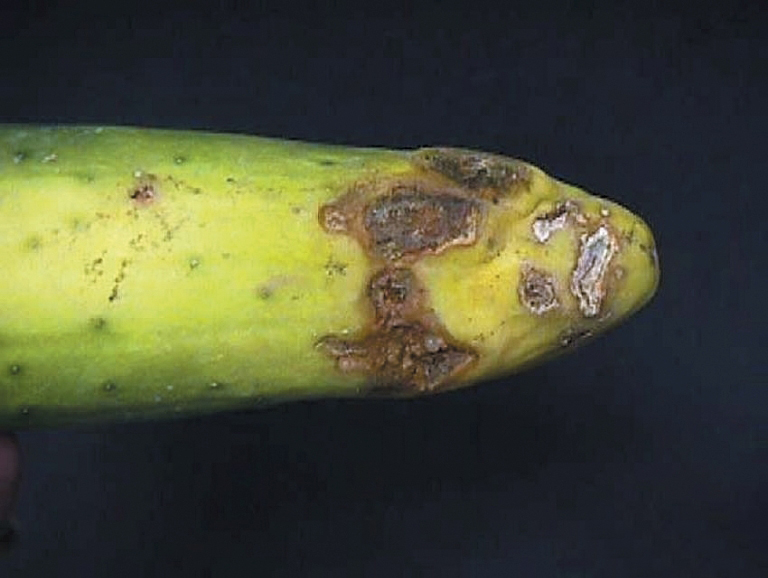
R. solani infection on cucumber

Basidiocarps (fruit bodies) are thin, effused, web-like, corticioid, smooth, and ochraceous. Microscopically they have comparatively wide hyphae without clamp connections. Basidia bear 2 to 4 sterigmata. Basidiospores are ellipsoid to oblong, smooth, and colourless, 7 to 10 × 4 to 5.5 μm. They frequently produce secondary spores and germinate by hyphal tubes. The anamorphs consist of hyphae and occasionally sclerotia (small propagules composed of thick-walled hyphae). The fungus produces white to deep brown mycelium when grown on an artificial medium and can often be recognized by the hyphae which are frequently monilioid (forming chains of swollen hyphal compartments), 4 to 15 μm wide, multinucleate, and tend to branch at right angles.

== Management ==
Complete control of Rhizoctonia solani is not possible, but the severity of the pathogen can be limited. Successful control depends on characteristics of the pathogen, host crops, and the environment. Controlling the environment, crop rotation, using resistant varieties, and minimizing soil compaction are effective and non-invasive ways to manage disease. Planting seedlings in warmer soil and getting plants to emerge quickly helps minimize damage. Crop rotation also helps minimize the amount of inoculum that results in infection. A few resistant varieties with moderate resistance to R. solani can be used, but they produce lower yields and quantity than standard varieties. Minimizing soil compaction helps water infiltration, drainage, and aeration for the plants.

One specific chemical option is a chemical spray pentachloronitrobenzene (PCNB), which is known to be the best solution to reducing damping-off of seeds on host plants. To minimize this soil-borne disease, certified seed free of sclerotia can be planted. Although fungicides are not the most effective way to manage this pathogen, a few have been approved in the United States by the USDA for control of the pathogen.

As long as seed growers stay clear of wet, poorly drained areas while also avoiding susceptible crops, R. solani is not usually a problem. Diseases caused by this pathogen are more severe in soils that are moderately wet and a temperature range of 15–18 °C (59–64 °F).

Rice genetically engineered for overexpression of oxalate oxidase has increased in vivo resistance.

== Economic importance ==
In the United States, Rhizoctonia solani can be found across all areas (environmental conditions permitting) where its host crops are located. The severity of infection can vary. Consequences include major yield losses (from 25% to 100%), increased soil tare (because the soil sticks to the fungal mycelium), and poor industrial quality of the crops based on increased levels of sodium, potassium, and nitrogen. Due to the number of hosts that the pathogen attacks, these consequences are numerous and detrimental to a variety of crops. Sheath blight caused by this pathogen is the second-most devastating disease after rice blast.

== Mycorrhizal association with orchids ==
Rhizoctonia solani is one of several Rhizoctonia species forming mycorrhizal associations with orchids. This association includes plant pathogenic strains of the fungus as well as non-pathogenic strains.

== Genome ==
The draft genome of R. solani strain Rhs1AP covers 51.7 Mbp, although the heterokaryotic genome of this strain was estimated at 86 Mb, based on an optical map of the chromosomes. The discrepancy is explained by the aneuploid, highly repetitive genome of this species which prevented sequencing (or assembling) the complete DNA. The genome is predicted to encode 12,726 genes. Another strain, AG1-IB 7/3/14, was recently sequenced too.
