= Trichodorus aequalis =

Scientific classification
- Kingdom: Animalia
- Phylum: Nematoda
- Class: Enoplea
- Order: Triplonchida
- Family: Trichodoridae
- Genus: Trichodorus
- Species: T. aequalis

Binomial name
- Trichodorus aequalis Allen, 1957

Species of worm

Trichordorus aequalis is a species of terrestrial root feeding (stubby-root) nematode. It is commonly found in North America.

== Description ==
The nematode is on average 0.81 mm in length, and its onchiostyle is 54 μm.
