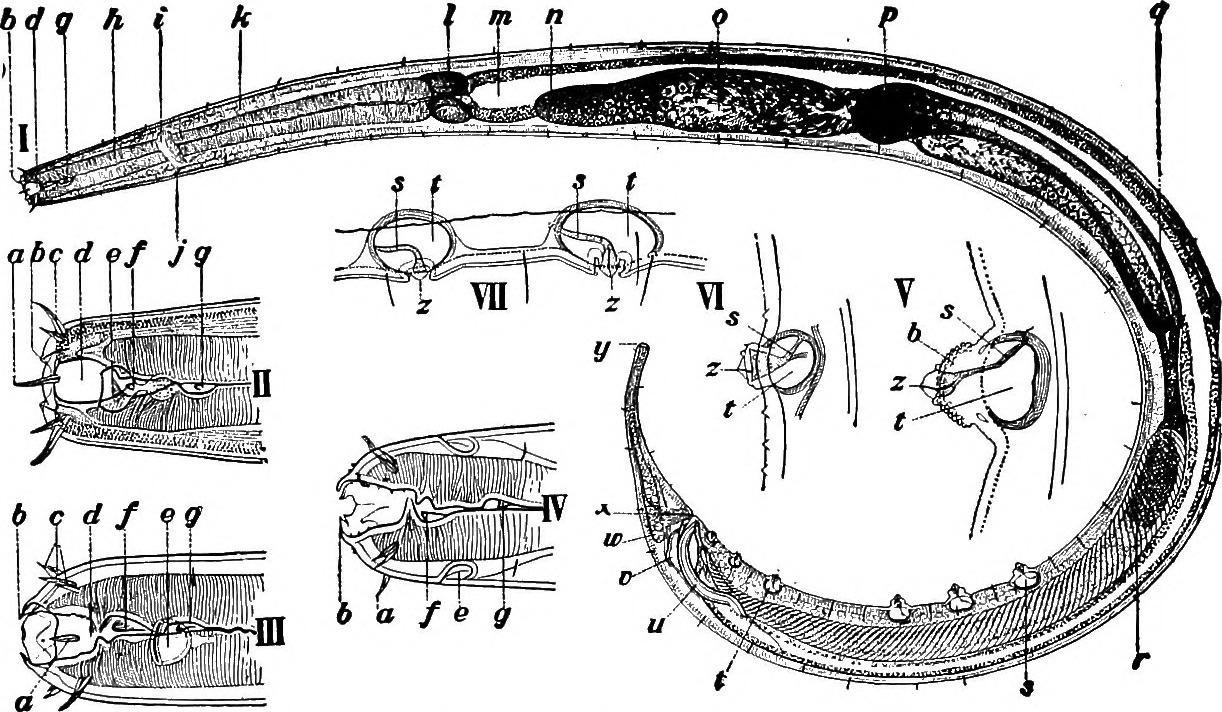
- I, male; II, head, lateral view; III, head, lateral view; IV, head, ventral view; V, anterior supple- mentary organ; VI, posterior supplementary organ; VII, two supplementary organs from an exceptional female. a, lateral seta; b, papilla; c, submedian seta; d, pharynx; e, lateral organ; f, tooth; g, tooth; h, esophagus; i, nerve-ring; j, excretory pore; k, body muscles; l, glandular (?) organs; m, intestine; n, blind-end anterior testicle; 0, testicle; p, junction of testicles; 5, blind-end posterior testicle; r, vas deferens: s, nerve of supplementary organ; t, cavity of supplementary organ; u, left spiculum; v, accessory piece; w, the three caudal glands; x, anus; y, terminus; z, apex of supplementary organ. (After Cobb.)

Scientific classification
- Kingdom: Animalia
- Phylum: Nematoda
- Class: Enoplea
- Order: Triplonchida
- Family: Tobrilidae
- Genus: Neotobrilus
- Species: N. longus

Binomial name
- Neotobrilus longus (Leidy, 1852)

Synonyms
- Anguillula longa Leidy, 1852; Tobrilus longus (Leidy, 1852) Andrássy, 1959; Trilobus longus (Leidy, 1852)

= Neotobrilus longus =

Species of roundworm

Neotobrilus longus is a nematode species from the family Tobrilidae, which lives in freshwater. The scientific name of the species was first validly published in 1852 by Joseph Leidy.
