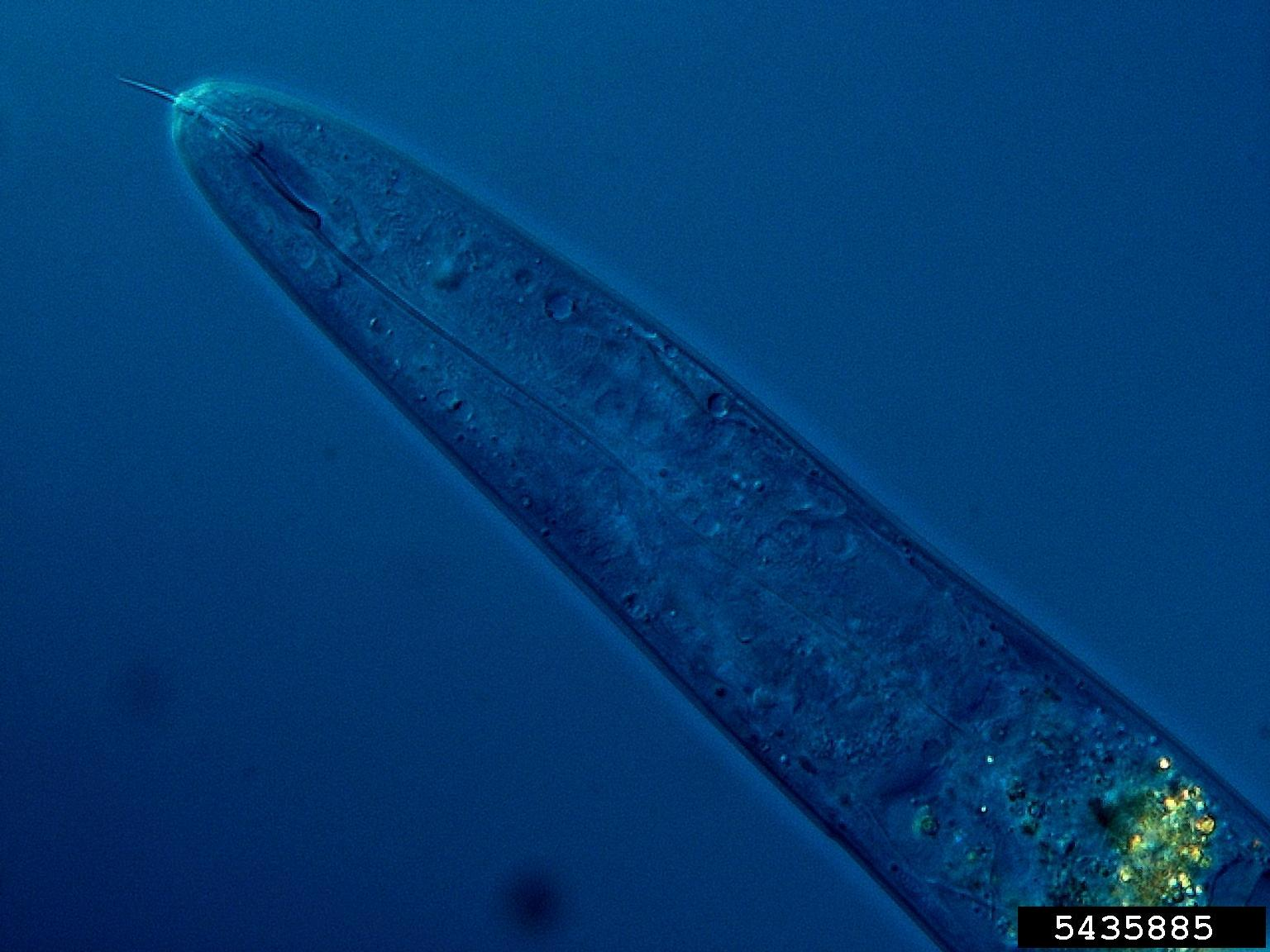

Scientific classification
- Kingdom: Animalia
- Phylum: Nematoda
- Class: Enoplea
- Order: Triplonchida
- Family: Trichodoridae
- Genus: Trichodorus; Cobb, 1913

Type species
- Trichodorus primitivus (de Man, 1876) Micol. 1922.

Species
- 69: Trichodorus obtusus; Trichodorus primitivus; ...

Synonyms
- Dorylaimus primitivus de Man, 1876

= Trichodorus =

Genus of roundworms

Trichodorus is a genus of terrestrial root feeding (stubby-root) nematodes in the Trichodoridae family (trichorids), being one of five genera. They are economically important plant parasites and virus vectors.

== Taxonomy ==
As originally described by Cobb in 1913, Trichodorus was the only genus in its family. However, in 1974 the genus was split into two genera in 1974 by Siddiqi, Trichodorus and Paratrichodorus.

The genus, which is the largest in the family consists of 69 species. The females are didelphic (two genital tracts), and are distributed worldwide.

== Plant pathology ==
Trichorids became of interest in 1951. At that time Trichodorus christie (=Paratrichodorus minor) was recognised as a pest of crops in Florida.

== Species ==
Trichodorus contains the following species:

- Trichodorus aequalis Allen, 1957
- Trichodorus altaicus De Waele & Brzeski, 1995
- Trichodorus andalusicus Decraemer, Palomares-Rius, Cantalapiedra-Navarette, Landa, Duarte, Almeida, Vovlas & Castillo, 2013
- Trichodorus aquitanensis Baujard, 1980
- Trichodorus arasbaranensis Zahedi, Niknam, Decraemer & Karegar, 2009
- Trichodorus asturanus Decraemer, Palomares-Rius, Cantalapiedra-Navarette, Landa, Duarte, Almeida, Vovlas & Castillo, 2013
- Trichodorus azorensis Almeida, De Waele, Santos & Sturhan, 1989
- Trichodorus beirensis Almeida, De Waele, Santos & Sturhan, 1989
- Trichodorus borai Rahman, Jairajpuri & Ahmad, 1985
- Trichodorus borneoensis Hooper, 1962
- Trichodorus cadusiensis Fadakar, Afshar & Pourjam & Pedram, 2021
- Trichodorus californicus Allen, 1957
- Trichodorus carlingi Bernard, 1992
- Trichodorus cedarus Yokoo, 1964
- Trichodorus complexus Rahman, Jairajpuri & Ahmad, 1985
- Trichodorus coomansi De Waele & Carbonell, 1983
- Trichodorus cottieri Clark, 1963
- Trichodorus cylindricus Hooper, 1962
- Trichodorus dilatatus Rodriguez-M & Bell, 1978
- Trichodorus eburneus De Waele & Carbonell, 1983
- Trichodorus elegans Allen, 1957
- Trichodorus elejohnsoni Bernard, 1992
- Trichodorus giennensis Decraemer, 1993
- Trichodorus gilanensis Maafi & Decraemer, 2002
- Trichodorus guangzhouensis Xie, Feng & Zhao, 2000
- Trichodorus hooperi Loof, 1973
- Trichodorus iliplaensis Decraemer, Palomares-Rius, Cantalapiedra-Navarette, Landa, Duarte, Almeida, Vovlas & Castillo, 2013
- Trichodorus intermedius Rodriguez-M & Bell, 1978
- Trichodorus iranicus Pedram & Pourjam, 2014
- Trichodorus iuventus Decraemer & Marais, 2000
- Trichodorus japonicus Zhao, Xie, Gu & Xu, 2013
- Trichodorus jeonjuensis Baek & Choi, 1995
- Trichodorus kilanae Decraemer & Marais, 1993
- Trichodorus lusitanicus Siddiqi, 1974
- Trichodorus magnus Decraemer & Marais M., 1993
- Trichodorus marylandi Decraemer, Kantor, Handoo & Subbotin, 2022
- Trichodorus minzi De Waele & Cohn, 1992
- Trichodorus nanjingensis Liu & Cheng, 1990
- Trichodorus obscurus Allen, 1957
- Trichodorus obtusus Cobb, 1913
- Trichodorus onubensis Decraemer, Palomares-Rius, Cantalapiedra-Navarette, Landa, Duarte, Almeida, Vovlas & Castillo, 2013
- Trichodorus orientalis De Waele & Hashim, 1984
- Trichodorus pakistanensis Siddiqi, 1962
- Trichodorus paracedarus Xu & Decraemer, 1995
- Trichodorus paragiennensis Decraemer, Palomares-Rius, Cantalapiedra-Navarette, Landa, Duarte, Almeida, Vovlas & Castillo, 2013
- Trichodorus parasilvestris Decraemer, Palomares-Rius, Cantalapiedra-Navarette, Landa, Duarte, Almeida, Vovlas & Castillo, 2013
- Trichodorus parorientalis Decraemer & Kilian, 1992
- Trichodorus paucisetosus Bernard, 1992
- Trichodorus persicus De Waele & Sturhan, 1987
- Trichodorus petrusalberti De Waele, 1988
- Trichodorus philipi De Waele, Meyer & Van Mieghem, 1990
- Trichodorus primitivus (de Man, 1880)
- Trichodorus pseudoaequalis Decraemer & Subbotin, 2021
- Trichodorus pseudobursatus Decraemer, Radivojevic & De La Pena, 2008
- Trichodorus reduncus Siddiqi & Sharma, 1995
- Trichodorus rinae Vermeulen & Heyns, 1984
- Trichodorus sanniae Vermeulen & Heyns, 1984
- Trichodorus silvestris Decraemer, Palomares-Rius, Cantalapiedra-Navarette, Landa, Duarte, Almeida, Vovlas & Castillo, 2013
- Trichodorus similis Seinhorst, 1963
- Trichodorus sparsus Szcygiel, 1968
- Trichodorus taylori De Waele, Mancini, Roca & Lamberti, 1982
- Trichodorus tricaudatus Shishida, 1979
- Trichodorus vandenbergae De Waele & Kilian, 1992
- Trichodorus variabilis Roca, 1997
- Trichodorus variopapillatus Hooper, 1972
- Trichodorus velatus Hooper, 1972
- Trichodorus viruliferus Hooper, 1963
- Trichodorus yokooi Eroshenko & Teplyakov, 1975
- Trichodorus zanjanensis Asghari, Eskandri, Tanha Maafi & Decraemer, 2018

== Bibliography ==
- Blaxter, Mark L.; De Ley, Paul; Garey, James R.; Liu, Leo X.; Scheldeman, Patsy; Vierstraete, Andy; Vanfleteren, Jacques R.; Mackey, Laura Y.; Dorris, Mark; Frisse, Linda M.; Vida, J. T.; Thomas, W. Kelley (5 March 1998). "A molecular evolutionary framework for the phylum Nematoda". Nature. 392 (6671): 71–75. doi:10.1038/32160. PMID 9510248. S2CID 4301939.
- Lee, Donald L, ed. (2010). The biology of nematodes. London: Taylor & Francis. ISBN 978-0415272117.
- De Ley, P & Blaxter, M 2004, 'A new system for Nematoda: combining morphological characters with molecular trees, and translating clades into ranks and taxa'. in R Cook & DJ Hunt (eds), Nematology Monographs and Perspectives. vol. 2, E.J. Brill, Leiden, pp. 633–653.
- Decraemer, W. 1980. Systematics of the Trichodoridae (Nematoda) with keys to their species. Revue. Nematol. 3(1): 81-99.
- Decraemer, W. (1995). The family Trichodoridae : stubby root and virus vector nematodes. Dordrecht: Kluwer Academic Publishers. ISBN 978-0792337737.
  - DECRAEMER, W. & BAUJARD, P., 1998. Additions and corrections to: Decraemer: The Family Trichodoridae. Fundamental and Applied Nematology 21 (2): 207-212.
- Zuckerman, B.N.; Mai, W.F.; Rohde, R.A., eds. (1971). Plant Parasitic Nematodes: Volume I. Morphology, Anatomy, Taxonomy, and Ecology. Oxford: Elsevier Science. ISBN 978-0323154246.
  - Perry, Roland N.; Moens, Maurice, eds. (2013). Plant nematology (2 ed.). Boston, MA: CABI. ISBN 978-1780641515.
