= Diphtherophorina =

Scientific classification
- Kingdom: Animalia
- Phylum: Nematoda
- Class: Enoplea
- Order: Triplonchida
- Suborder: Diphtherophorina; Coomans & Loof, 1970

Superfamily
- see text

Suborder of roundworms

Diphtherophorina is a suborder of terrestrial nematodes, being one of three that constitute suborder Triplonchida.

== Taxonomy ==
There is a single superfamily, the Diphtherophoroidea (formerly Trichodoiroidea (Thorne, 1935) Siddiqi, 1961), consisting of two families;

- Diphtherophoridae
- Trichodoridae

== Bibliography ==
- Blaxter, Mark L.; De Ley, Paul; Garey, James R.; Liu, Leo X.; Scheldeman, Patsy; Vierstraete, Andy; Vanfleteren, Jacques R.; Mackey, Laura Y.; Dorris, Mark; Frisse, Linda M.; Vida, J. T.; Thomas, W. Kelley (5 March 1998). "A molecular evolutionary framework for the phylum Nematoda". Nature. 392 (6671): 71–75. doi:10.1038/32160. PMID 9510248. S2CID 4301939.
- Lee, Donald L, ed. (2010). The biology of nematodes. London: Taylor & Francis. ISBN 978-0415272117.
- De Ley, P & Blaxter, M 2004, 'A new system for Nematoda: combining morphological characters with molecular trees, and translating clades into ranks and taxa'. in R Cook & DJ Hunt (eds), Nematology Monographs and Perspectives. vol. 2, E.J. Brill, Leiden, pp. 633–653.
- Zhang, Zhi-Qiang, ed. (2011). Animal biodiversity : an outline of higher-level classification and survey of taxonomic richness. Auckland, N.Z.: Magnolia Press. ISBN 978-1869778491.
