= Paratrichodorus =

Scientific classification
- Kingdom: Animalia
- Phylum: Nematoda
- Class: Enoplea
- Order: Triplonchida
- Family: Trichodoridae
- Genus: Paratrichodorus; Siddiqi, 1974

Type species
- Paratrichodorus tunisiensis Siddiqi

Species
- Paratrichodorus minor; Paratrichodorus pachydermus; Paratrichodorus tunisiensis; ...

Genus of roundworms

Paratrichodorus is a genus of terrestrial root feeding (stubby-root) nematodes in the Trichodoridae family (trichorids), being one of five genera. They are economically important plant parasites and virus vectors. The females are didelphic (two genital tracts), and are distributed worldwide.

== Taxonomy ==
Historically, Trichodorus formed the only genus in the Trichodoridae family. Then Trichodorus was split into two genera in 1974 by Siddiqi, Trichodorus and Paratrichodorus. The genus, which is the second largest in the family consists of 34 species. Siddiqi based the separation on the position of the gland nuclei and the type of pharyngo-intestinal junction.

=== Subdivision ===
Using the same characteristics as those establishing the genus, Siddiqi described three subgenera, Paratrichodorus, Atlantadorus and Nanidorus, but Decraemer did not support the validity of this. While the latter approach has not been accepted by some authorities, Siddiqi elevated them to genus status in 1980, an approach that few other authors have followed, but maintained by that author, and now receiving some support from modern molecular approaches to taxonomy. At least in the case of Nanidorus, phylogenetic analysis has supported its recognition as a separate genus, although clustering with Trichodorus rather than its parent Paratrichodorus.

== Plant pathology ==
Trichorids became of interest in 1951. At that time Trichodorus christie (=Paratrichodorus minor) was recognised as a pest of crops in Florida.

== Bibliography ==
- Blaxter, Mark L.; De Ley, Paul; Garey, James R.; Liu, Leo X.; Scheldeman, Patsy; Vierstraete, Andy; Vanfleteren, Jacques R.; Mackey, Laura Y.; Dorris, Mark; Frisse, Linda M.; Vida, J. T.; Thomas, W. Kelley (5 March 1998). "A molecular evolutionary framework for the phylum Nematoda". Nature. 392 (6671): 71–75. doi:10.1038/32160. PMID 9510248. S2CID 4301939.
- Lee, Donald L, ed. (2010). The biology of nematodes. London: Taylor & Francis. ISBN 978-0415272117.
- De Ley, P & Blaxter, M 2004, 'A new system for Nematoda: combining morphological characters with molecular trees, and translating clades into ranks and taxa'. in R Cook & DJ Hunt (eds), Nematology Monographs and Perspectives. vol. 2, E.J. Brill, Leiden, pp. 633–653.
- Decraemer, W. (1995). The family Trichodoridae: stubby root and virus vector nematodes. Dordrecht: Kluwer Academic Publishers. ISBN 978-0792337737.
  - DECRAEMER, W. & BAUJARD, P., 1998. Additions and corrections to: Decraemer: The Family Trichodoridae. Fundamental and Applied Nematology 21 (2): 207-212.
- Zuckerman, B.N.; Mai, W.F.; Rohde, R.A., eds. (1971). Plant Parasitic Nematodes: Volume I. Morphology, Anatomy, Taxonomy, and Ecology. Oxford: Elsevier Science. ISBN 978-0323154246.
- Perry, Roland N.; Moens, Maurice, eds. (2013). Plant nematology (2 ed.). Boston, MA: CABI. ISBN 978-1780641515.
- Duarte, Isabel; Neilson, Roy; Decraemer, Wilfrida; Brown, Derek; de Almeida, Maria Teresa M.; Marques (1 February 2010). "Phylogenetic relationships, based on SSU rDNA sequences, among the didelphic genera of the family Trichodoridae from Portugal". Nematology. 12 (2): 171–180. doi:10.1163/156854109X461721. hdl:1822/18363.
- Kumari, S.; Subbotin, S. A. (December 2012). "Molecular characterization and diagnostics of stubby root and virus vector nematodes of the family Trichodoridae (Nematoda: Triplonchida) using ribosomal RNA genes". Plant Pathology. 61 (6): 1021–1031. doi:10.1111/j.1365-3059.2012.02598.x.
