= Cultivar group =

Grouping used for cultivated plants

A Group (previously cultivar-group) is a formal category in the International Code of Nomenclature for Cultivated Plants (ICNCP) used for cultivated plants (cultivars) that share a defined characteristic. It is represented in a botanical name by the symbol Group or Gp. "Group" or "Gp" is always written with a capital G in a botanical name, or epithet. (Note: ICNCP's publisher, the International Society for Horticultural Science, also prefers to use the capitalized orthography in running text, e.g. "several Groups", but this stylization has not been universally adopted even in specialist literature. It is always given as "Group" or "Gp" in an actual name.) The Group is not italicized in a plant's name. The ICNCP introduced the term and symbol "Group" in 2004, as a replacement for the lengthier and hyphenated "cultivar-group", which had previously been the category's name since 1969. For the old name "cultivar-group", the non-standard abbreviation cv. group or cv. Group is also sometimes encountered. There is a slight difference in meaning, since a cultivar-group was defined to comprise cultivars, whereas a Group may include individual plants. The cultivar-groups, in turn, replaced the similar category convariety (convar.), which did not necessarily contain named varieties.

The ICNCP distinguishes between "group" in lowercase and "Group" capitalized. It defines lowercase "group" as "an informal taxon not recognized in the ICBN", and capitalized "Group" as the formal taxon defined by the ICNCP (see above).

This categorization does not apply to plant taxonomy generally, only to horticultural and agricultural contexts. Any given Group may have a different taxonomic classification, such as a subspecific name (typically a form or variety name, given in italics) after the genus and species.

A Group is usually united by a distinct common trait, and often includes members of more than one species within a genus. For example, early flowering cultivars in the genus Iris form the Iris Dutch Group. A plant species that loses its taxonomic status in botany, but still has agricultural or horticultural value, meets the criteria for a cultivar group, and its former botanical name can be reused as the name of its cultivar group. For example, Hosta fortunei is usually no longer recognized as a species, and the ICNCP states that the epithet fortunei can be used to form Hosta Fortunei Group.

== Orthography ==
Every word in a Group name is capitalized (unless that conflicts with linguistic custom; for example, lower-case is used after a hyphen in a hyphenated term, like "Red-skinned", and for conjunctions and prepositions except in the first word of the name). This is followed by the capitalized word "Group". The combined Group name is not italicized or otherwise stylized, and follows the italicized Latin epithet. It can also be used after a vernacular name for the species, genus, or other category. Examples:

- Lilium Darkest Red Group
- Neofinetia falcata Hariba Group
- hollyhock Chater's Double Group

"Group" may be abbreviated "Gp" (without a terminal . character (Note: "Gp" without a period (full point) is consistent with other abbreviated horticultural symbols like "gx" for grex, and differs from higher-level taxonomic style, e.g. "var." for "variety" and "f. sp." for "forma specialis" in the International Code of Nomenclature for algae, fungi, and plants (ICN).)). A cultivar group may be surrounded by parentheses (round brackets) for clarity in long epithets:

- Solanum tuberosum (Maincrop Group) 'Desiree'

ICNCP illustrates this order consistently, though in actual practice the cultivar name in single quotation marks may come before that of the cultivar group (with or without parentheses):

- Solanum tuberosum 'Desiree' Maincrop Group

"Group" is translated in non-English material, and uses the word order of the language in question, but is always capitalized. Translation may or may not be applied to the name itself. For example, "Chater's Double Group" may appear as "Groupe Chater's Double" in French (retaining the English name but translating "Group" and using French word order), yet with full translation as "Chaters Doppelte Gruppe" in German.

Groups are not necessarily mutually exclusive. For example, the same potato may be designated Solanum tuberosum Maincrop Group, or Solanum tuberosum Red-skinned Group, or given with both as Solanum tuberosum Maincrop Red-skinned Group, "depending on the purpose of the classification used".

== See also ==
- Grex (horticulture), a taxonomic category for hybrid orchids, defined by parentage rather than by characteristics
- Polyploid, having extra sets of chromosomes. Polyploidy is a characteristic sometimes used to define a cultivar group.
