= List of African daisy diseases =

This is a list of diseases of the African daisy (Gerbera jamesonii) plant

== Bacterial diseases ==
Bacterial diseases
Bacterial leaf spot	Pseudomonas cichorii
Southern wilt	Ralstonia solanacearum

== Fungal diseases ==
Fungal diseases
Ascochyta leaf spot	Ascochyta doronici
Alternaria leaf spot	Alternaria alternata Alternaria dauci Alternaria gerberae
Black root rot	Thielaviopsis basicola
Botrytis blight	Botrytis cinerea
Cercospora leaf spot	Cercospora gerberae
Downy mildew	Plasmopara sp.
Fusarium crown rot	Fusarium solani
Fusarium root rot	Fusarium oxysporum
Fusarium wilt	Fusarium oxysporum
Nectria canker	Nectria haematococca
Phyllosticta leaf spot	Phyllosticta sp.
Phytophthora crown and root rot	Phytophthora cryptogea Phytophthora parasitica
Powdery mildew	Golovinomyces sp. Podosphaera xanthii complex
Pythium root rot	Pythium spp.
Rhizoctonia root and crown rot	Rhizoctonia solani
Rhizopus blight	Rhizopus stolonifer
Sclerotinia blight	Sclerotinia sclerotiorum
Septoria leaf spot	Septoria sp.
Southern blight	Sclerotium rolfsii
Verticillium wilt	Verticillium albo-atrum
Web blight	Rhizoctonia solani
White rust	Pustula obtusata

== Nematodes, parasitic ==
Nematodes, parasitic
Foliar nematode	Aphelenchoides fragariae
Root knot nematodes	Meloidogyne arenaria Meloidogyne hapla Meloidogyne incognita Meloidogyne javanica
Sting nematode	Belonolaimus longicaudatus
Stubby root nematode	Paratrichodorus minor

== Virus and viroid diseases ==
Virus and viroid diseases
Cucumber mosaic	genus Cucumovirus, Cucumber mosaic virus (CMV)
Impatiens necrotic spot	genus Tospovirus, Impatiens necrotic spot virus (INSV)
Spotted wilt	genus Tospovirus, Tomato spotted wilt virus (TSWV)
Tobacco mosaic	genus Tobamovirus, Tobacco mosaic virus (TMV)
Tobacco ring spot	genus Tobravirus, Tobacco rattle virus (TRV)

== Phytoplasmal diseases ==
Phytoplasmal diseases
Yellows	Phytoplasma
