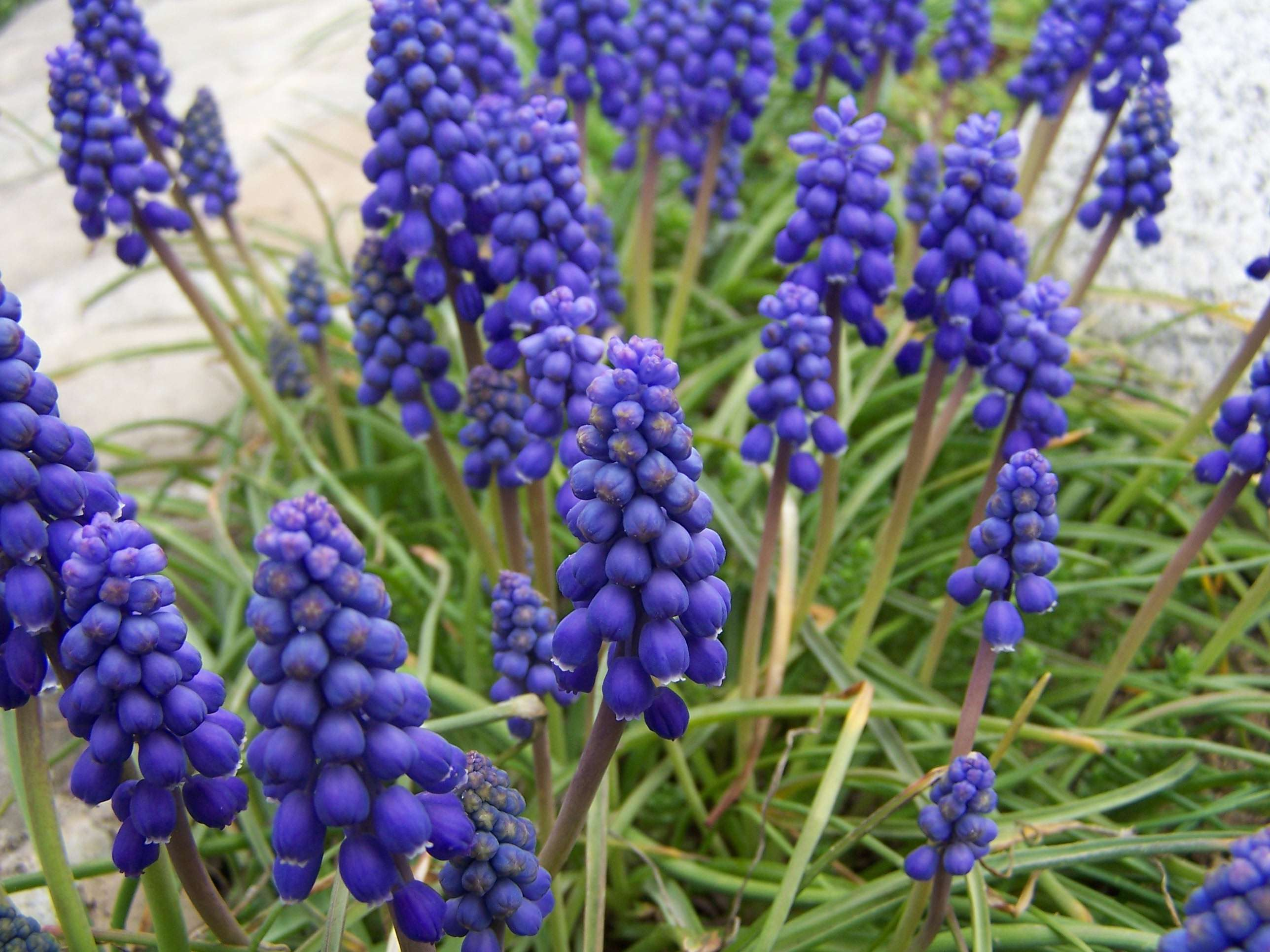
- Flowering plants

Scientific classification
- Kingdom: Plantae
- Clade: Embryophytes
- Clade: Tracheophytes
- Clade: Angiosperms
- Clade: Monocots
- Order: Asparagales
- Family: Asparagaceae
- Subfamily: Scilloideae
- Genus: Muscari
- Subgenus: Muscari subg. Muscari
- Species: M. armeniacum

Binomial name
- Muscari armeniacum Leichtlin

= Muscari armeniacum =

Species of plant in the asparagus family

Muscari armeniacum is a species of flowering plant in the squill subfamily Scilloideae of the asparagus family Asparagaceae (formerly the lilies, Liliaceae). It is a bulbous perennial with basal, simple leaves and short flowering stems. It is one of a number of species and genera known as grape hyacinth, in this case Armenian grape hyacinth or garden grape-hyacinth. The flowers are purple, blue (with a white fringe), white (cv. 'Album') or pale pink (cv. 'Pink Sunrise') and the plants are usually 15 centimetres (6 in) tall. M. armeniacum blooms in mid-Spring (April or May in the Northern Hemisphere) for 3–4 weeks. Some selections are fragrant. Established bulbs leaf in the autumn. M. armeniacum is widespread in the woods and meadows of the Eastern Mediterranean, from Greece and Turkey to the Caucasus, including Armenia which gives it its name.

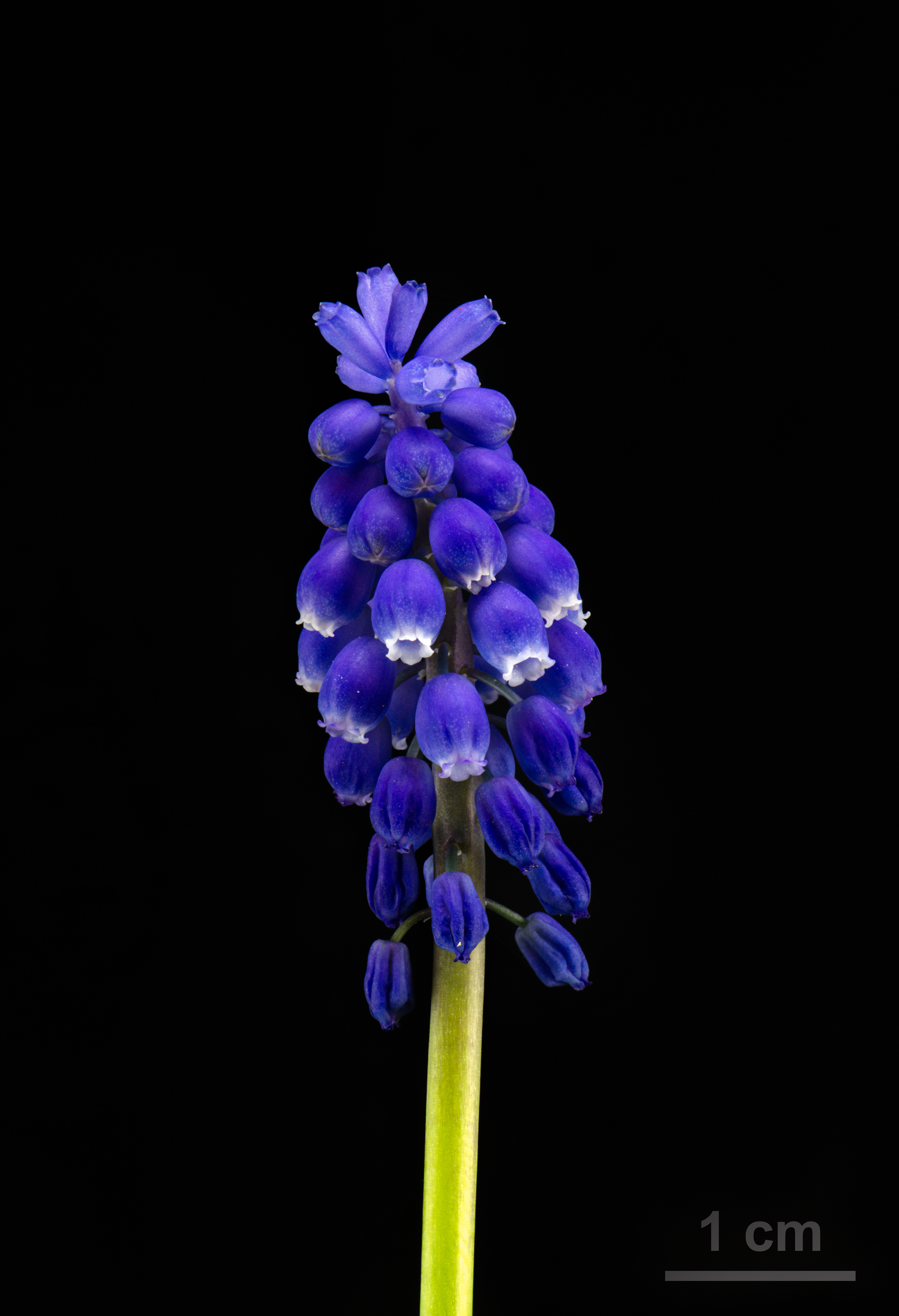
Flower details

== Cultivation ==
Muscari armeniacum is one of the most commonly cultivated species of Muscari, is robust and naturalises easily. It appeared in European gardens in 1871. The following have gained the Royal Horticultural Society's Award of Garden Merit:

- M. armeniacum
- M. armeniacum 'Christmas Pearl'
- M. armeniacum 'Jenny Robinson'
- M. armeniacum 'Saffier'

Cultivars listed by Mathew include 'Blue Spike' and 'Cantab'. Others include 'Argaei Album' and 'Album' (white), 'Côte d'Azur', 'Dark Eyes, 'Early Giant', 'Fantasy Creation', 'Peppermint', 'Saffier', 'Valerie Finnis' (pale blue), and 'Pink Sunrise' (pale pink). The commonly available form is often referred to as M. armeniacum 'Blue'.

'Blue Spike' is a double flowered variety, with double florets on the flower stalk. 'Cantab' is pale blue. 'Fantasy Creation' is a sport (a naturally occurring genetic mutation) of 'Blue Spike'. 'Atlantic' is light blue, introduced by Jan van Bentem in 2002, by hybridisation in 1990 from M. armeniacum and an unknown parent.

== Gallery ==
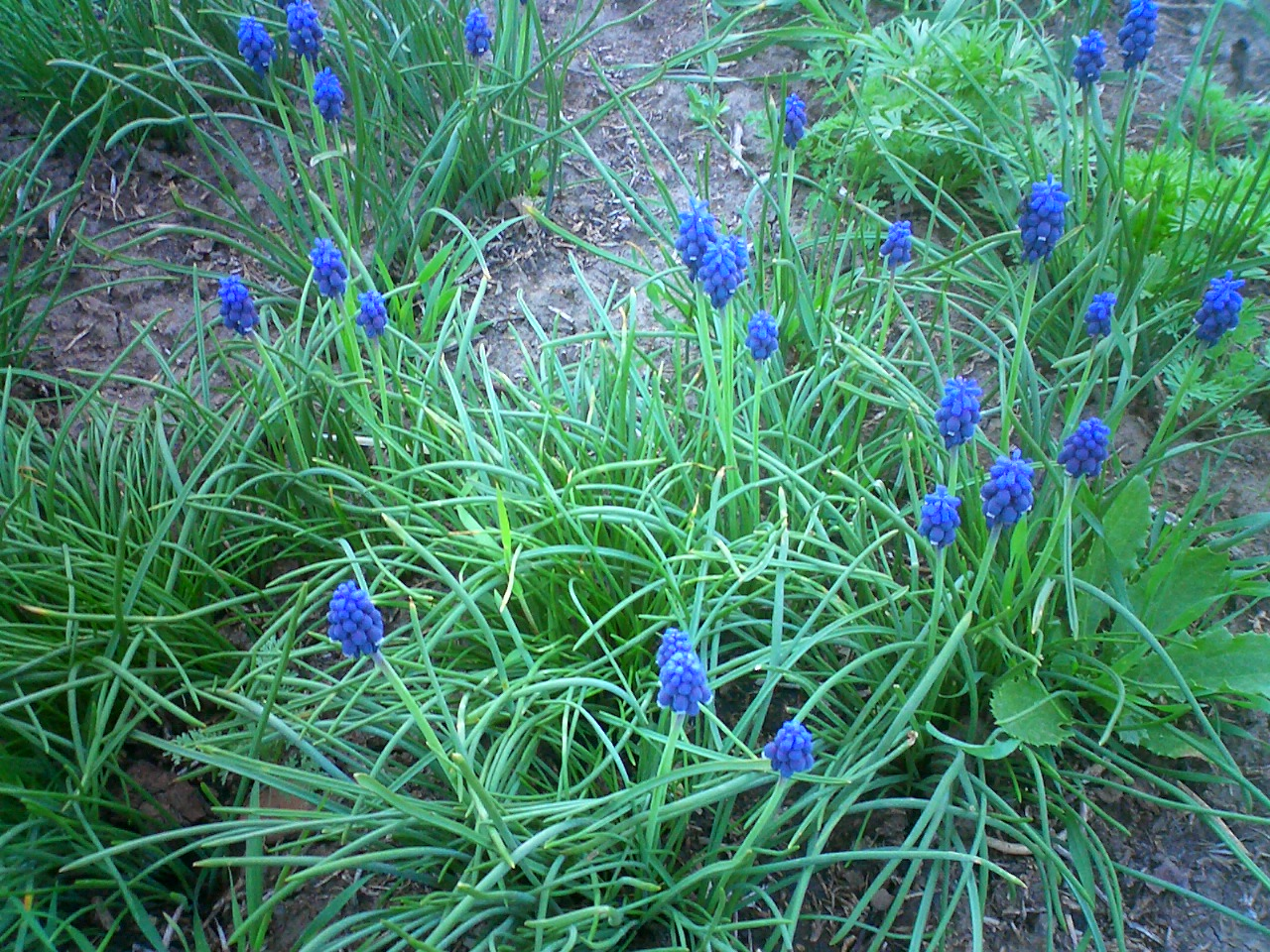
Muscari armeniacum growing in the wild in Oshakan, Armenia

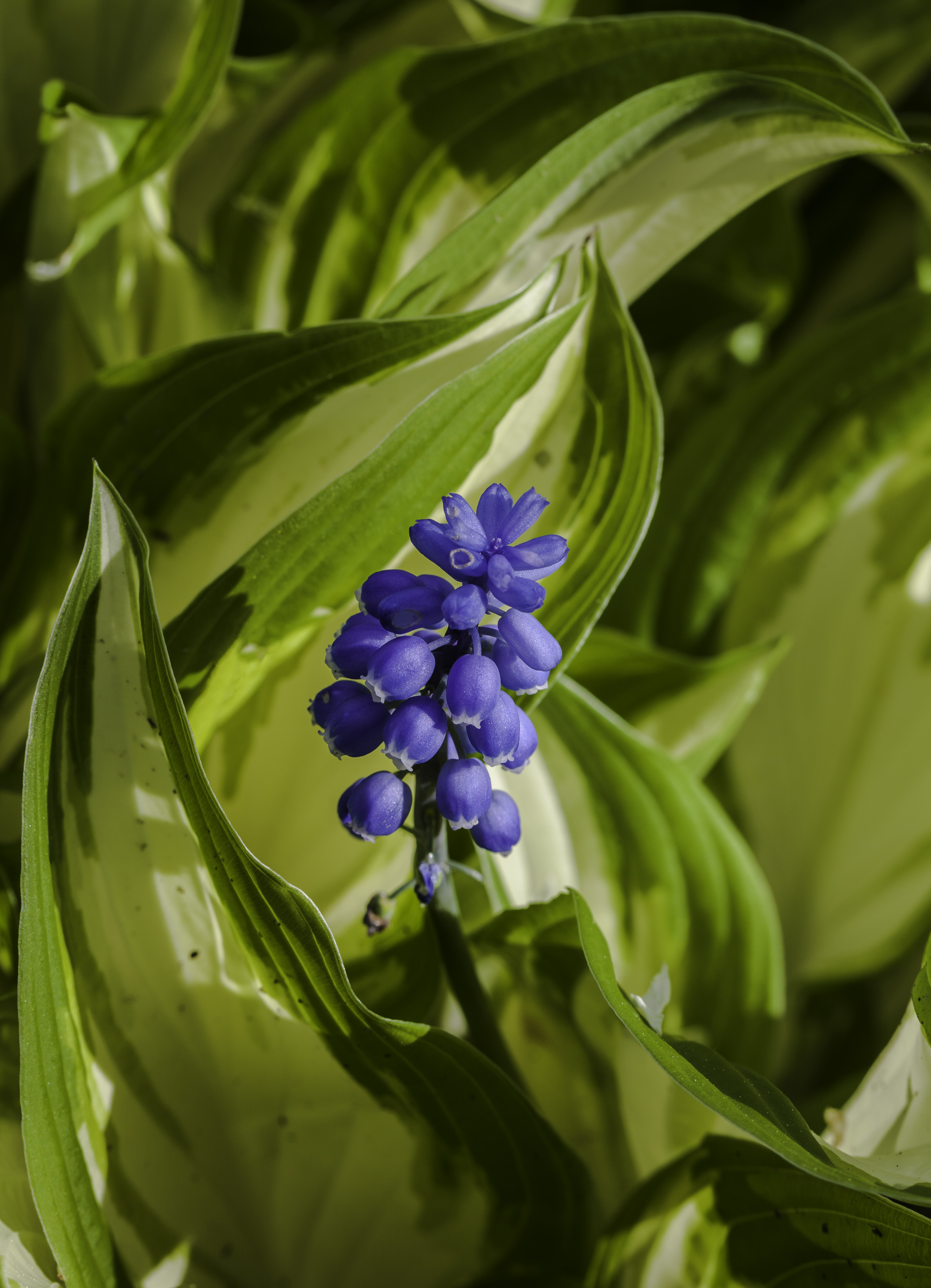
Bell-shaped flowers of a Muscari armeniacum surrounded by leaves of Hosta 'Undulata', Munich Botanical Garden, Germany

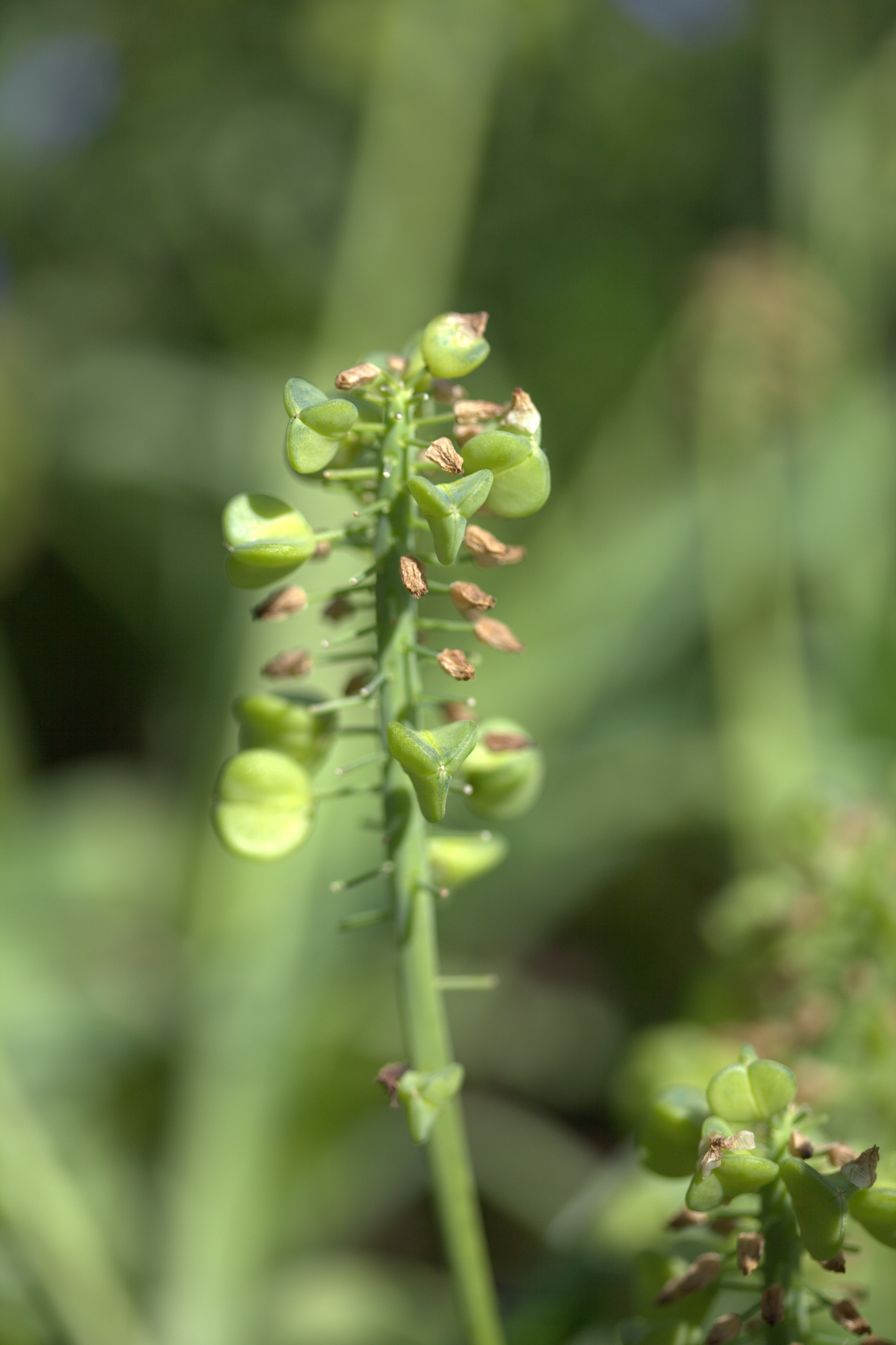
Immature capsules of Muscari armeniacum 'Peppermint', Gothenburg Botanical Garden, Sweden

== Sources ==
- Taylor's guide to Bulbs. Houghton Mifflin Boston 1986. p. 350. ISBN 0-395-40449-5
