= Hosta × tardiva =

Scientific classification
- Kingdom: Plantae
- Clade: Tracheophytes
- Clade: Angiosperms
- Clade: Monocots
- Order: Asparagales
- Family: Asparagaceae
- Subfamily: Agavoideae
- Genus: Hosta
- Species: H. × tardiva

Binomial name
- Hosta × tardiva Nakai

Synonyms
- Hosta × cathayana F.Maek.; Hosta × cathayana Araki

Species of flowering plant

Hosta × tardiva is a hybrid species of shade-tolerant foliage plants in the genus Hosta. It is a hybrid of H. kikutii and H. sieboldii.
