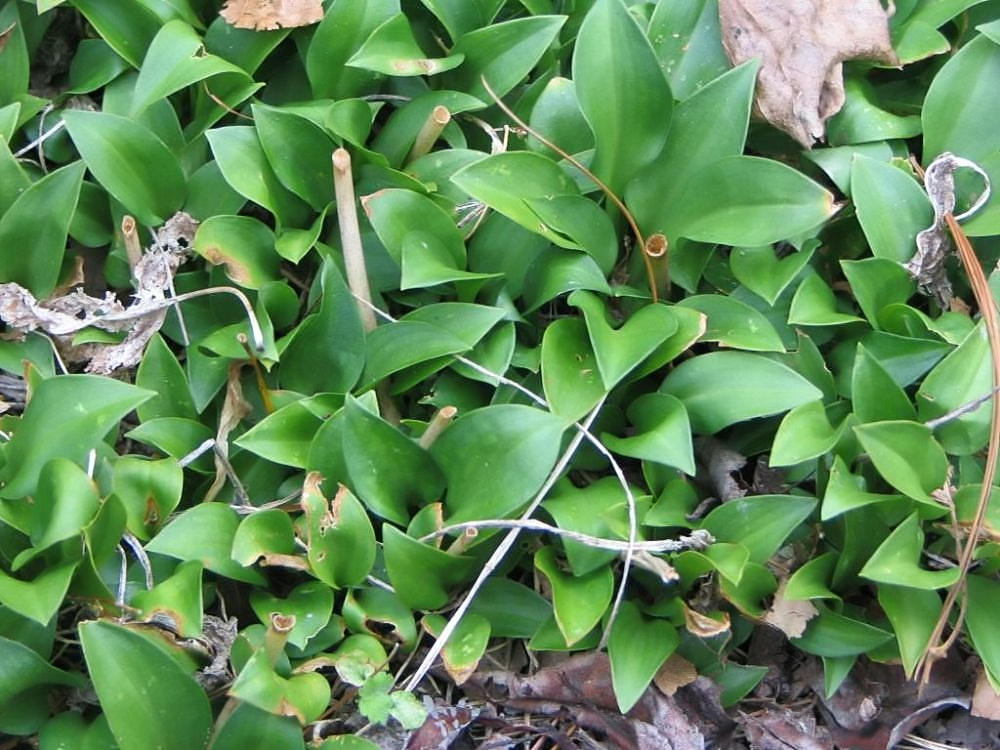
- At the United States National Arboretum

Scientific classification
- Kingdom: Plantae
- Clade: Embryophytes
- Clade: Tracheophytes
- Clade: Spermatophytes
- Clade: Angiosperms
- Clade: Monocots
- Order: Asparagales
- Family: Asparagaceae
- Subfamily: Agavoideae
- Genus: Hosta
- Species: H. venusta

Binomial name
- Hosta venusta F.Maek.

Synonyms
- Hosta minor var. venusta (F.Maek.) M.Kim & H.Jo; Hosta taquetii (H.Lév.) M.G.Chung & J.W.Kim

= Hosta venusta =

Species of flowering plant

Hosta venusta, the handsome plantain lily, is a species of flowering plant in the family Asparagaceae, native to Jeju Island of South Korea, with a few populations in central Japan. It may have arisen from Hosta minor populations isolated on Jeju since the last ice age. One of the smallest hostas, it cold hardy to USDA zone 3, shade tolerant, and is well suited for rock gardens, borders and as a ground cover.
