= Onchiostyle =

Feeding spear of a worm

An onchiostyle is a curved solid dorsal tooth (feeding spear) that extends from the anterior esophageal wall that is used during feeding. The onchiostyle is most commonly found in Trichodoridae nametodes.

== Structure and components ==
The onchiostyle consists of two main parts:

- Onchium: the curved solid tooth that punctures the plants.
- Onchiophore: the supporting extension that holds the onchium.

The onchiostyle is slightly curved, solid at the tip, and lacks stylet knobs. It is usually considered a modified tooth rather than a hollow needle.

== Examples and measurements ==
A couple of examples are the Trichodorus aequalis and the Trichodorus marylandi. The T. aequalis has an onchiostyle of 54 μm, and the T. marylandi has a onchiostyle of between 47 and 59 μm.

== Function in feeding ==
The onchiostyle is used to puncture epidermal and sub-epidermal root cell, and also to inject salivary secretions.
