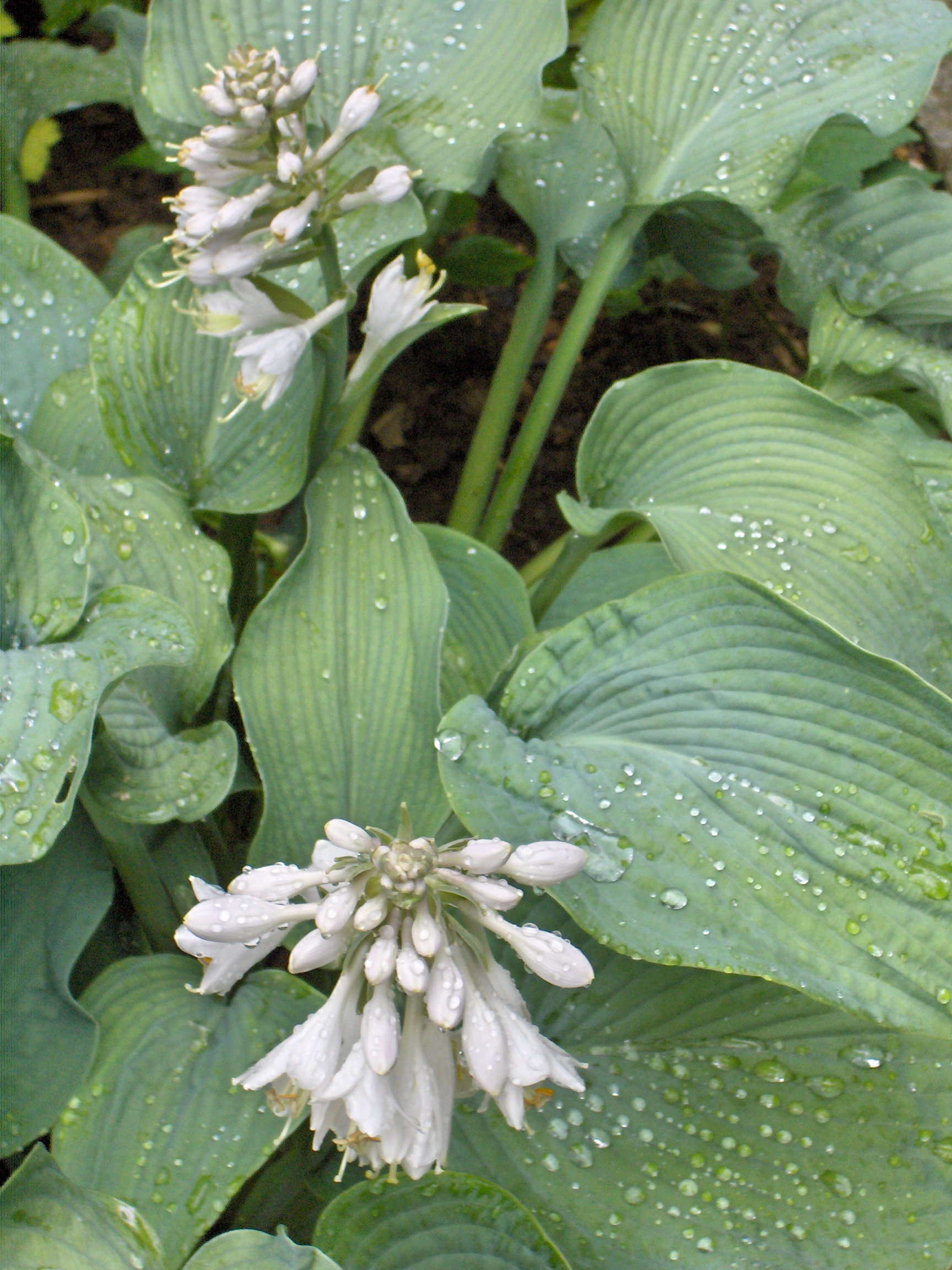
- 'Bressingham Blue', a Hosta cultivar

Scientific classification
- Kingdom: Plantae
- Clade: Embryophytes
- Clade: Tracheophytes
- Clade: Angiosperms
- Clade: Monocots
- Order: Asparagales
- Family: Asparagaceae
- Subfamily: Agavoideae
- Genus: Hosta; Tratt., conserved name, not Jacq. (syn of Cornutia in Lamiaceae) nor Vell. ex Pfeiff. (Primulaceae)

Synonyms
- Saussurea Salisb., illegitimate homonym, not DC. (Saussurea in Asteraceae); Bryocles Salisb.; Niobe Salisb.; Funkia Spreng., illegitimate homonym, not Willd. (syn of Astelia in Asteliaceae); Libertia Dumort., illegitimate homonym, not Spreng. (Libertia in Iridaceae) nor Lej. (syn of Bromus in Poaceae)

= Hosta =

Genus of flowering plants

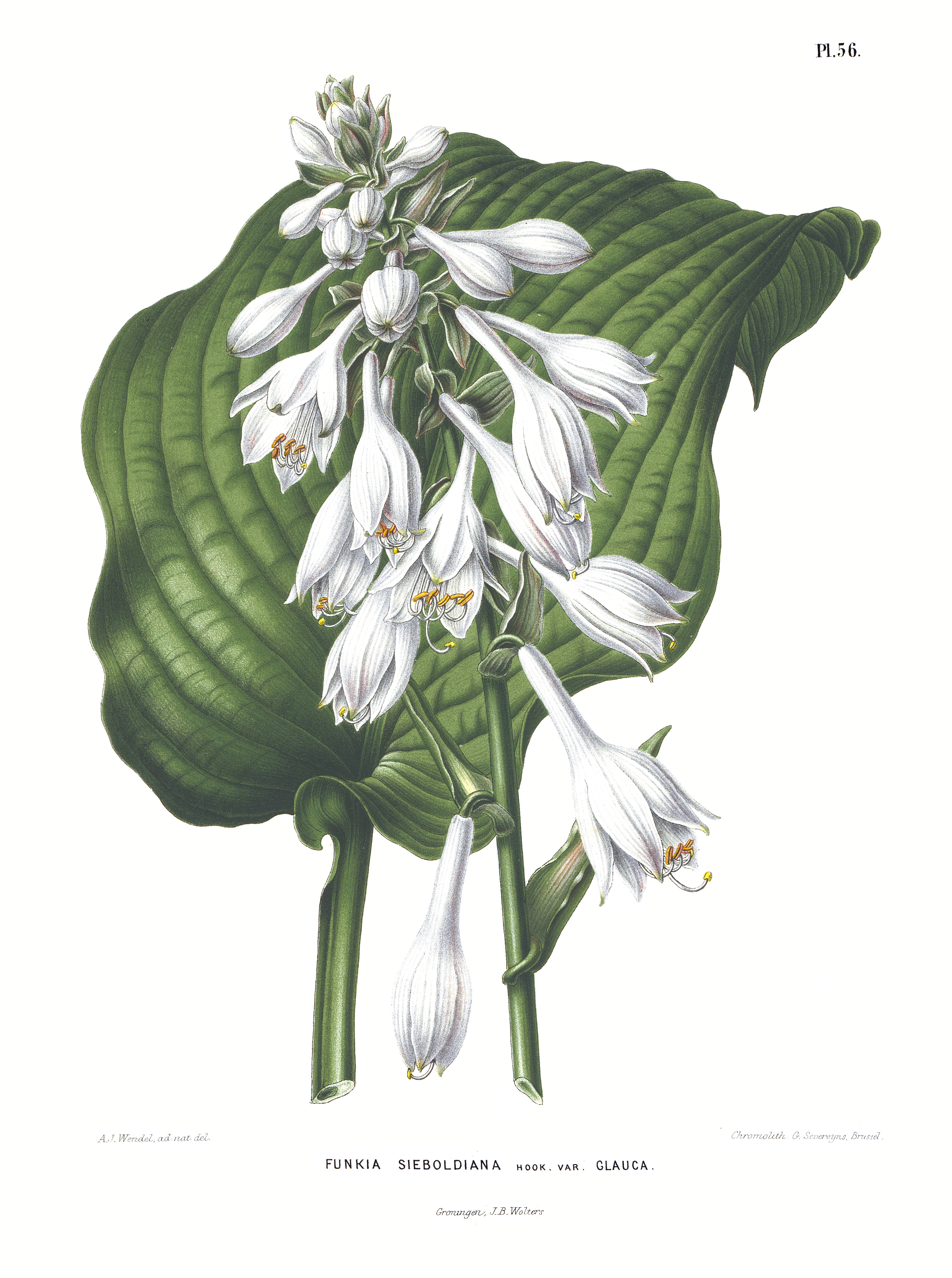
Hosta sieboldiana by Abraham Jacobus Wendel, 1868

Hosta (/ˈhɒstə/, syn. Funkia) is a genus of plants commonly known as hostas, plantain lilies and occasionally by the Japanese name gibōshi. Hostas are widely cultivated as shade-tolerant foliage plants. The genus is placed in the family Asparagaceae, subfamily Agavoideae, and is native to northeast Asia (China, Japan, Korea, and the Russian Far East). Like many "lilioid monocots", the genus was once classified in the Liliaceae. The genus was named by Austrian botanist Leopold Trattinnick in 1812, in honor of the Austrian botanist Nicholas Thomas Host. In 1817, the generic name Funkia was used by German botanist Kurt Sprengel in honor of Heinrich Christian Funck, a collector of ferns and alpines. It was later used as a common name and is referenced in some older literature.

== Description ==
Hostas are herbaceous perennial plants, growing from rhizomes which are sometimes stoloniferous, with broad lanceolate or ovate leaves varying widely in size by species from 1–18 in (2.5–45.7 cm) long and 0.75–12 in (2–30 cm) broad. The smallest varieties are called miniatures. Variation among the numerous cultivars is even greater, with clumps ranging from less than 4 in (10 cm) across and 3 in (7.6 cm) high to more than 6 ft (1.8 m) across and 4 ft (1.2 m) high. Leaf color in wild species is typically green, although some species (e.g., H. sieboldiana) are known for a glaucous waxy leaf coating that gives a blue appearance to the leaf. Some species have a glaucous white coating covering the underside of the leaves. Natural mutations of native species are known with yellow-green ("gold") colored leaves or with leaf variegation (either white/cream or yellowish edges or centers). Variegated plants very often give rise to sports which are the result of the reshuffling of cell layers during bud formation, producing foliage with mixed pigment sections. In seedlings variegation is generally maternally derived by chloroplast transfer and is not a genetically inheritable trait.

The flowers of hosta are produced on upright scapes that are woody and remain on the plant throughout winter, they are generally taller than the leaf mound, and end in terminal racemes. The individual flowers are usually pendulous, 0.75–2 in (1.9–5.1 cm) long, with six tepals, white, lavender, or violet in color and usually scentless. The only strongly fragrant species is Hosta plantaginea, which has white flowers up to 4 in (10 cm) long; it is also unusual in that the flowers open in the evening and close by morning. The species blooms in late summer and is sometimes known as "August Lily".

== Taxonomy ==
Taxonomists differ on the number of Hosta species; there may be as many as 45. Accordingly, the list of species given here may be taken loosely. The genus may be broadly divided into three subgenera. Interspecific hybridization occurs since all the species have the same chromosome number (2n = 2x = 60); except H. ventricosa which is a natural tetraploid that sets seed through apomixis. Many cultivated hostas formerly described as species have been reduced to cultivars; the names of these are often conserved and retain Latinised names which resemble species names (e.g., Hosta 'Fortunei').

Accepted species as of July 2021:

Image	Scientific name	Distribution
	Hosta albofarinosa	Anhui
	Hosta capitata	Japan, Korea
	Hosta clausa	Korea, Manchuria, Primorye
	Hosta hypoleuca	Honshu
	Hosta jonesii	Korean Islands
	Hosta kikutii	Japan
	Hosta kiyosumiensis	Honshu
	Hosta lancifolia	Russian Far East, Japan
	Hosta longipes	Japan, Korea
	Hosta longissima	Japan, Korea
	Hosta minor	Kyushu, Korea
	Hosta plantaginea	China
	Hosta pulchella	Kyushu
	Hosta pycnophylla	Honshu
	Hosta shikokiana	Shikoku
	Hosta sieboldiana	Japan, Korea
	Hosta sieboldii	Japan
	Hosta tsushimensis	Kyushu
	Hosta ventricosa	S China
	Hosta venusta	Jeju-do, Japan
	Hosta yingeri	Korean Islands

=== Accepted hybrids ===
- Hosta × alismifolia – Honshu
- Hosta × tardiva

== Cultivation ==
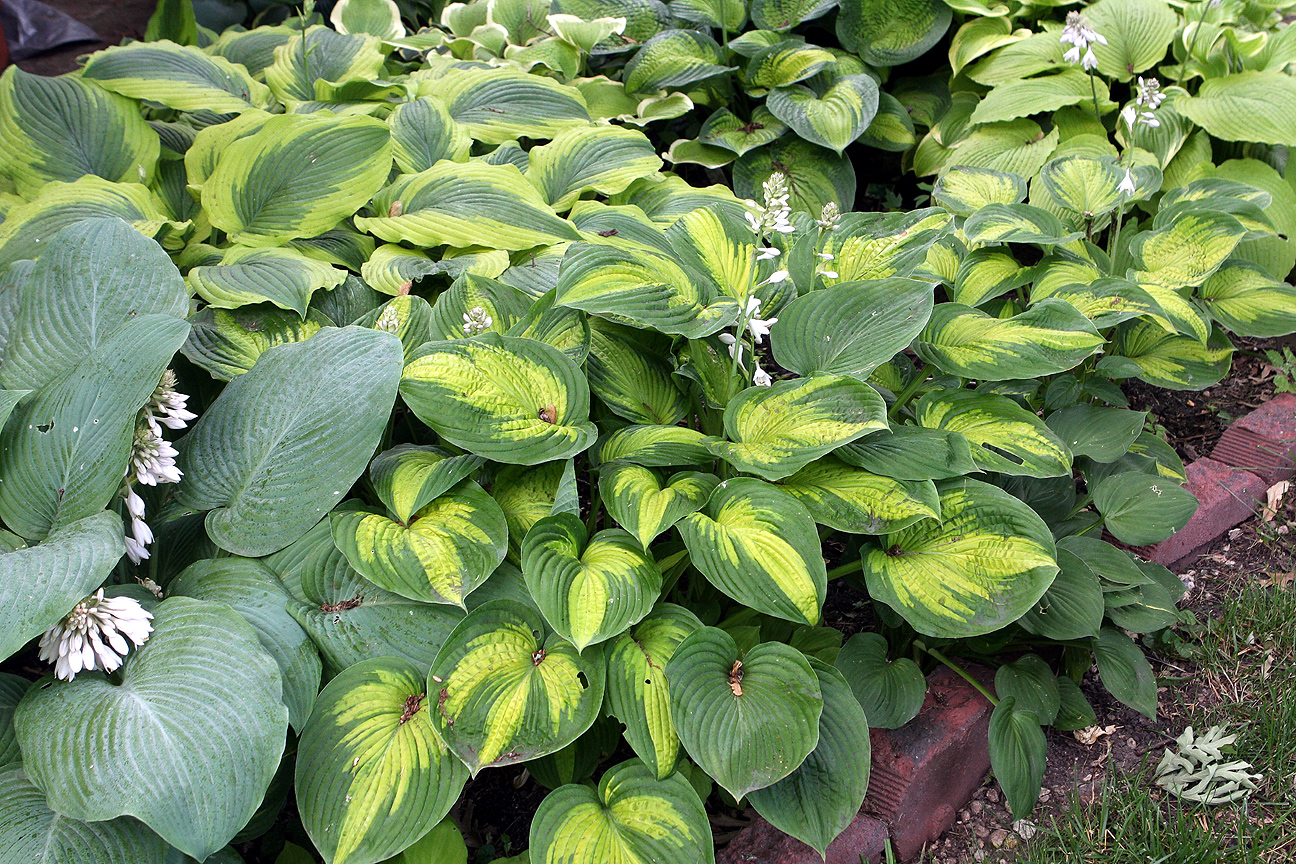
Hosta

Hostas are widely cultivated, being particularly useful in the garden as shade-tolerant plants whose striking foliage provides a focal point. The plants are long-lived perennials that are winter hardy in USDA Zones 3 to 8 and recommended for heat zones 8 to 1. Though Hosta plantaginea originates in China, most of the species that provide the modern plants were introduced from Japan to Europe by Philipp Franz von Siebold in the mid-19th century originating from shady locations with more moisture than they are generally cultivated. Newer species have been discovered on the Korean peninsula as well. Hybridization within and among species and cultivars has produced numerous cultivars. The American Hosta Society is the International Cultivar Registration Authority for Hosta, and recognizes over 7,200 registered or reserved names.

Cultivars with golden- or white-variegated leaves are especially prized. Popular cultivars include 'Francee' (green leaves with white edges), 'Gold Standard' (yellow leaves with green edges, discovered by Pauline Banyai) 'Undulata' (green leaves with white centers), 'June' (blue-green leaves with creamy centers), and 'Sum and Substance' (a huge plant with chartreuse-yellow leaves). Newer, fragrant cultivars including 'Guacamole' are also popular.

The American Hosta Society and the British Hosta and Hemerocallis Society support hosta display gardens, often within botanical gardens. Hostas are frequently exhibited at major shows like the Chelsea Flower Show.

=== Cultivars ===
Here is a list of cultivars that have gained the Royal Horticultural Society's Award of Garden Merit:

- 'Allegan Fog'
- 'Aureomarginata' (ventricosa)
- 'Blue Angel' (sieboldiana)
- 'Blue Mouse Ears'
- 'Christmas Tree'
- 'Cracker Crumbs'
- 'Devon Green'
- 'El Niño' (Tardiana Group)
- 'Fire Island'
- 'First Frost'
- 'Francee' (fortunei)
- 'Frances Williams'
- 'Golden Tiara'
- 'Halcyon' (tardiana)
- H. fortunei var. aureomarginata
- H. plantaginea var. japonica
- H. sieboldiana var. elegans
- H. undulata var. undulata
- H. ventricosa
- H. venusta
- 'June' (tardiana)
- 'Krossa Regal'
- 'Liberty'
- 'Orange Marmalade'
- 'Paradise Puppet'
- 'Patriot'
- 'Paul's Glory'
- 'Praying Hands'
- 'Revolution'
- 'Royal Standard'
- 'Sagae'
- 'Shining Tot'
- 'Stained Glass'
- 'Sum and Substance'
- 'Touch of Class'
- 'Whirlwind'
- 'Wide Brim'

== Toxicity ==
While usually grown for ornamental purposes, all species of hosta are edible, and are grown as vegetables in some Asian cultures. However, hostas may be toxic to dogs, cats, and horses if consumed in large quantities because some contain saponins. Symptoms include vomiting and diarrhea.

== Pests and diseases ==
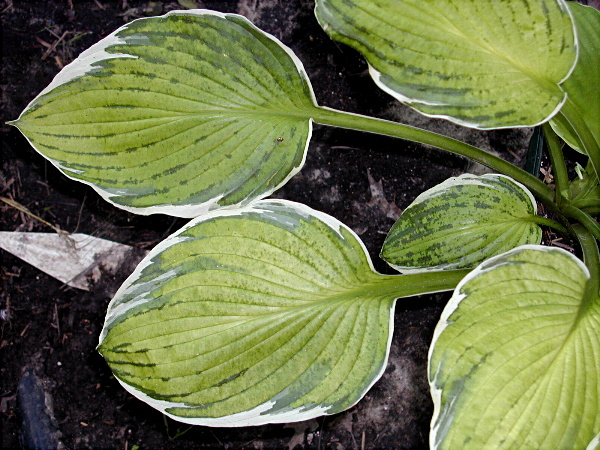
Hosta with virus X

Hosta leaves and stems are eaten by deer, rabbits, slugs, and snails. The roots and rhizomes are eaten by voles. All of these animals can cause extensive damage to collections in gardens. Some varieties seem more resistant to slug damage, which is more prevalent later in the growing season, than others. Insect pests include vine weevils and cutworms.

Foliar nematodes, which leave streaks of dead tissue between veins, have become an increasing problem where pesticide use has decreased. A potexvirus called 'Hosta Virus X' was first identified in Minnesota in 1996. Plants which are infected are destroyed to prevent its spread as the disease can be transmitted from plant to plant by contaminated sap. Symptoms include dark green "ink bleed" marks in the veins of yellow-colored leaves, and/or tissue collapse between veins. It can take years for symptoms to show, so symptomless plants in infected batches should also be considered infected.

Other viruses which infect hosta include: Tomato Ringspot Virus, Impatiens Necrotic Spot Virus, Tobacco Rattle Virus, Cucumber Mosaic Virus and several unidentified viruses. Fungal diseases which affect hosta include: crown rot caused by Fusarium hostae. It causes stunting and late emergence of the plants, leaf chlorosis, browning and necrosis.
