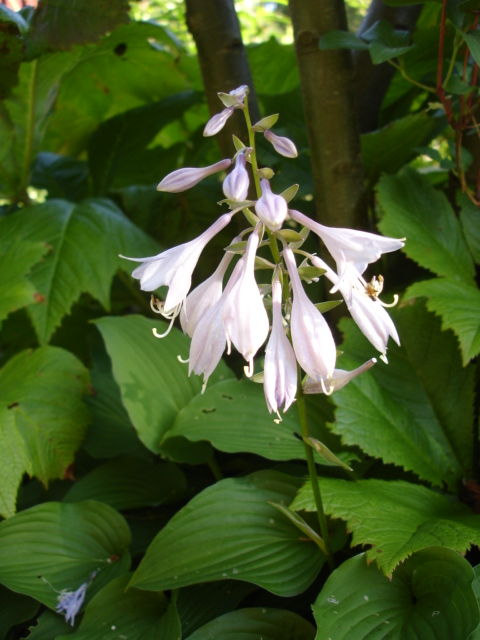

Scientific classification
- Kingdom: Plantae
- Clade: Tracheophytes
- Clade: Angiosperms
- Clade: Monocots
- Order: Asparagales
- Family: Asparagaceae
- Subfamily: Agavoideae
- Genus: Hosta
- Species: H. capitata

Binomial name
- Hosta capitata (Koidz.) Nakai

= Hosta capitata =

Species of flowering plant

Hosta capitata is a perennial species of flowering plant in the genus Hosta, native to central and southern Japan as well as South Korea.
