= Diphtherophoridae =

Scientific classification
- Domain: Eukaryota
- Kingdom: Animalia
- Phylum: Nematoda
- Class: Enoplea
- Order: Triplonchida
- Family: Diphtherophoridae

Family of roundworms

Diphtherophoridae is a family of nematodes belonging to the order Triplonchida.

Genera:

- Diphtherophora de Man, 1880
- Longibulbophora Yeates, 1967
- Triplonchium Cobb, 1920
- Tylolaimophorus de Man, 1880
