= Paratrichodorus minor =

Scientific classification
- Domain: Eukaryota
- Kingdom: Animalia
- Phylum: Nematoda
- Class: Enoplea
- Order: Triplonchida
- Family: Trichodoridae
- Genus: Paratrichodorus
- Species: P. minor

Binomial name
- Paratrichodorus minor (Colbran) Siddiqi

Synonyms
- Nanidorus minor Paratrichodorus christiei Trichodorus christiei

Species of roundworm

Paratrichodorus minor is a species of nematode in the family Trichodoridae, the stubby-root nematodes. It occurs in tropical and subtropical regions of the world. It damages plants by feeding on the roots and it is a vector of plant viruses. It is a pest of some agricultural crops.

Like other stubby-root nematodes, this species is microscopic, reaching up to 0.71 millimeters in length. Its body is rounded at both ends. It has an onchiostyle, a curved, solid stylet which it uses to puncture plant roots. It stabs the plant tissue rapidly, up to 10 times per second, to make a hole. It injects saliva, which hardens into a hollow tube, and it uses this like a drinking straw to withdraw the contents of the plant cells. It moves around the root, leaving old tubes in place and creating new ones. It is an ectoparasite, attacking the plant externally rather than entering its tissues.

Damage to plants is evident when it stops the roots from growing, leaving the root system "stubby"-looking. A plant cannot obtain water and nutrients from the soil and becomes stunted and wilted. It shows signs of nutrient deficiency. An affected crop field may have patches of withered plants. The nematode also introduces viruses to plants, including tobacco rattle virus, which causes the disease corky ringspot in potatoes. A potato tuber with corky ringspot has large brown rings on its surface and discolored spots inside. Entire potato crops can be made unmarketable by the appearance of the disease.

The nematode has been observed in over 100 plant hosts, including turfgrasses such as St. Augustine grass and bermudagrass, vegetables such as cabbage and tomato, and other crops such as corn, sorghum, sugarcane, peanut, and soybean. It is a pest of vineyards in California. It is most abundant in coarse soils.

Most individuals of the species are female and they reproduce by parthenogenesis, producing offspring without fertilization. They lay eggs in the soil and the juveniles feed on roots as they develop. The length of the life cycle varies with temperature, but it may be as short as 16 days.

== Infected plants ==
See :

- List of African daisy diseases
- List of cucurbit diseases
- List of grape diseases
- List of oat diseases
- List of pearl millet diseases
- List of sorghum diseases
- List of soybean diseases
- List of sweet potato diseases
