= Tobrilidae =

Scientific classification
- Kingdom: Animalia
- Phylum: Nematoda
- Class: Enoplea
- Order: Triplonchida
- Suborder: Tobrilina
- Superfamily: Tobriloidea
- Family: Tobrilidae; De Coninck, 1965

Family of worms

Tobrilidae is a family of nematodes belonging to the order Triplonchida.

== Genera ==
Genera:

- Asperotobrilus Shoshin, 1991
- Brevitobrilus Tsalolikhin, 1981
- Epitobrilus Tsalolikhin, 1981
- Eutobrilus Tsalolikhin, 1981
- Kurikania Tsalolikhin, 1976
- Macrotobrilus Tsalolikhin, 1981
- Mesotobrilus Tsalolikhin, 1981
- Neotobrilus Tsalolikhin, 1981
- Paratrilobus Micoletzky, 1922
- Quasibrilus Tsalolikhin, 1976
- Semitobrilus Tsalolikhin, 1981
- Tobriloides Loof, 1973
- Tobrilus Andrássy, 1959
