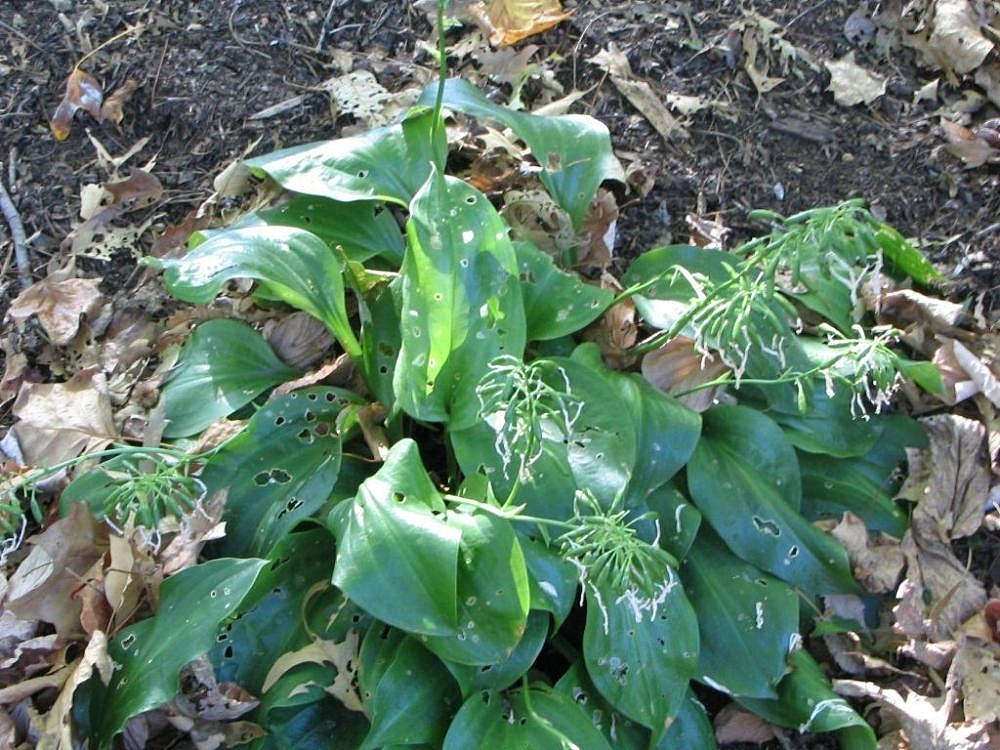

Scientific classification
- Kingdom: Plantae
- Clade: Tracheophytes
- Clade: Angiosperms
- Clade: Monocots
- Order: Asparagales
- Family: Asparagaceae
- Subfamily: Agavoideae
- Genus: Hosta
- Species: H. yingeri

Binomial name
- Hosta yingeri S.B.Jones

= Hosta yingeri =

Species of flowering plant

Hosta yingeri is a perennial species of the genus Hosta. The species is rare and is only found in a few offshore islands along the southwestern coast of South Korea.
