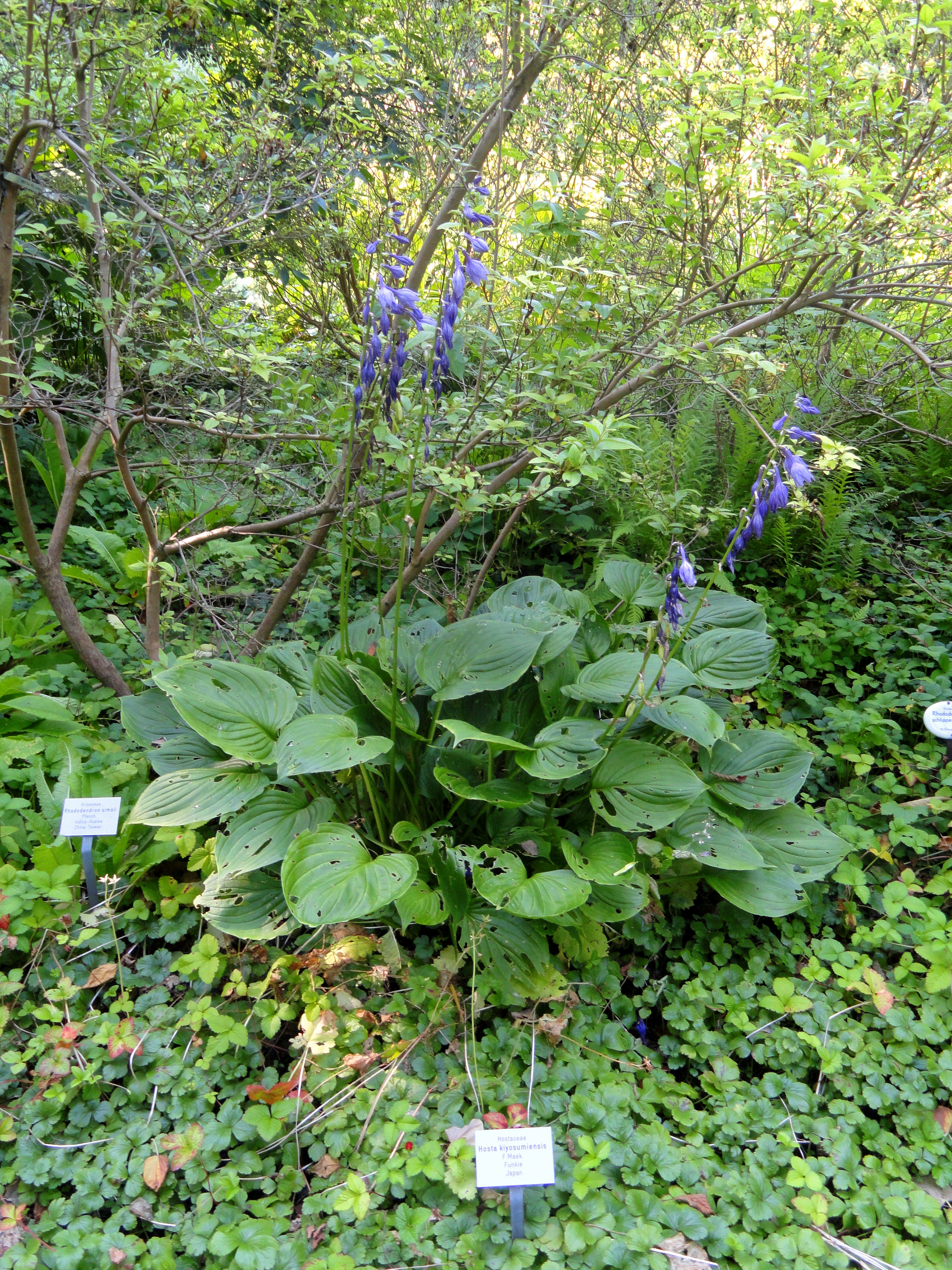

Scientific classification
- Kingdom: Plantae
- Clade: Tracheophytes
- Clade: Angiosperms
- Clade: Monocots
- Order: Asparagales
- Family: Asparagaceae
- Subfamily: Agavoideae
- Genus: Hosta
- Species: H. kiyosumiensis

Binomial name
- Hosta kiyosumiensis F.Maek.

Synonyms
- Hosta densa F.Maek.; Hosta hippeastrum F.Maek.; Hosta pachyscapa F.Maek.; Hosta petrophila F.Maek.; Hosta praecox F.Maek.

= Hosta kiyosumiensis =

Species of flowering plant

Hosta kiyosumiensis (キヨスミギボウシ, kiyosumigiboushi) is a species of Hosta, found in Japan from Kanto south to Chubu and Kansai, and encompassing the entire central part of Honshu. Plants range from 30 to 45 cm in diameter, and up to 25 cm high. Petiole is 7.5–10 by 0.7 cm, erect, broadly grooved, keeled, triangular in cross section, green in color and at the base barely purple dotted. Leaves are 10–15 by 5–7.5 cm. Specimens exhibit many different leaf shapes from narrow-lanceolate to widely-ovate, with straight or wavy margins.
