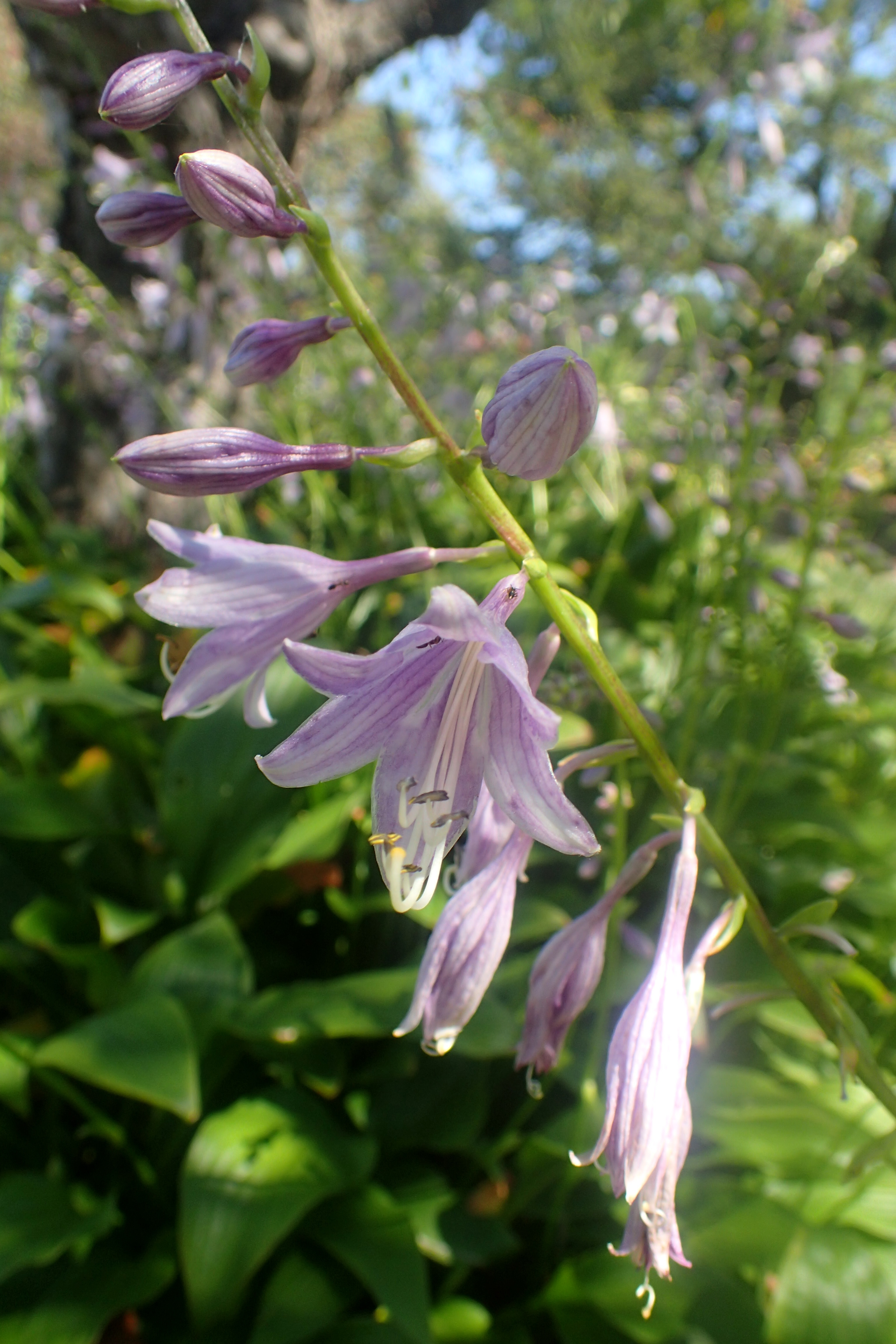
- Inflorescence
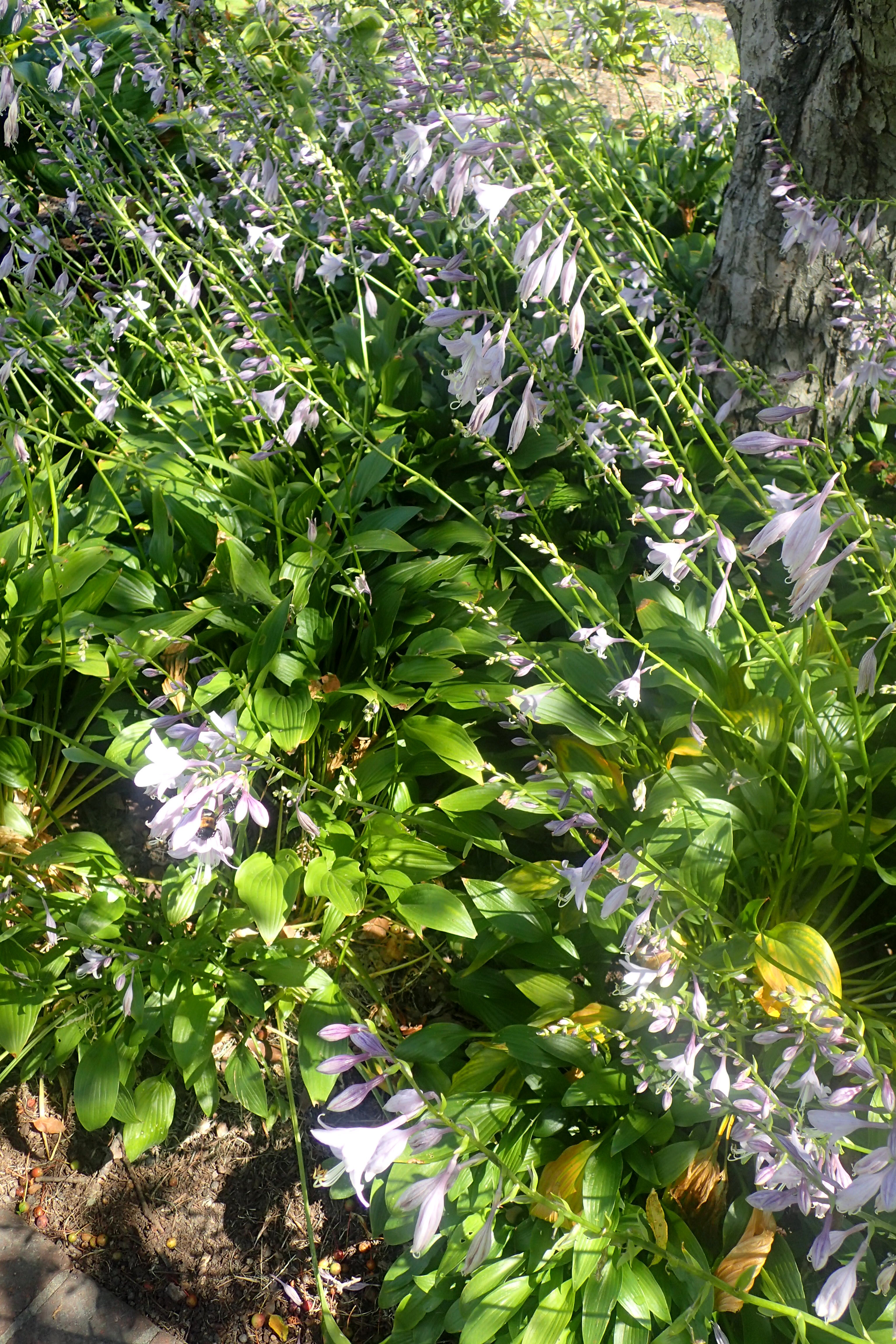
- Habit

Scientific classification
- Kingdom: Plantae
- Clade: Tracheophytes
- Clade: Angiosperms
- Clade: Monocots
- Order: Asparagales
- Family: Asparagaceae
- Subfamily: Agavoideae
- Genus: Hosta
- Species: H. lancifolia

Binomial name
- Hosta lancifolia (Thunb.) Engl.

Synonyms
- List: Aletris japonica Thunb.; Funkia caerulea f. lancifolia (Thunb.) Matsum.; Funkia lancifolia (Thunb.) Spreng.; Funkia ovata f. lancifolia (Thunb.) Miq.; Funkia ovata var. lancifolia (Thunb.) Miq.; Funkia sieboldiana var. lancifolia (Thunb.) Matsum.; Hemerocallis japonica (Thunb.) Thunb.; Hemerocallis lancifolia Thunb.; Hosta japonica (Thunb.) Asch.; Hosta sieboldii f. lancifolia (Thunb.) H.Hara; Niobe japonica (Thunb.) Nash

= Hosta lancifolia =

Species of plant

Hosta lancifolia, the narrow-leaved plantain lily or narrow-leaved hosta, is a species of flowering plant in the family Asparagaceae. It is native to the southern Russian Far East and Japan, and it has been introduced to the northeastern United States and Bulgaria. A perennial cultigen reaching 0.5 m (20 in), it is available from commercial nurseries. Hardy in USDA zones 3 through 8, it is recommended for shady situations.
