= Hosta hypoleuca =

Scientific classification
- Kingdom: Plantae
- Clade: Embryophytes
- Clade: Tracheophytes
- Clade: Spermatophytes
- Clade: Angiosperms
- Clade: Monocots
- Order: Asparagales
- Family: Asparagaceae
- Subfamily: Agavoideae
- Genus: Hosta
- Species: H. hypoleuca

Binomial name
- Hosta hypoleuca Murata

Species of flowering plant

Hosta hypoleuca, the white-backed hosta (ウラジロギボウシ, urajirogiboushi), is a species of flowering plant in the family Asparagaceae. It is native to eastern Aichi Prefecture, Japan. It is restricted to cliffs, gorges, canyon walls, and other steep, rocky situations, typically near waterfalls or rivulets, and typically south-facing. A protected species, it is considered endangered in Japan due to road construction, and illegal collection for the garden trade.

It is a candidate for rock gardens and green walls, as it has a number of adaptations for survival on cliffs. These include clinging roots, leaves with white undersides that reflect heat reradiating from rocks, and the ability to produce more or fewer leaves depending on water and soil availability. It is variable in its leaf shape and venation pattern, depending on which clone was originally collected in the wild. When cultivated on flat ground, it produces more leaves in the typical hosta growth form. It is the pod parent of a number of hybrid cultivars, including 'Arch Duke', 'Bedford Blue', 'King David', 'Kiwi Hippo', 'Lakeside Lagoon', 'Limestone Lover', 'Maggie May', 'Show Stopper', 'Talladega', and 'Uncle Albert', with the 'Maekawa', 'Butternut Hill', 'Setsurei', and 'Thor' cultivars actually being selfed progeny of the species, and therefore not hybrids.
