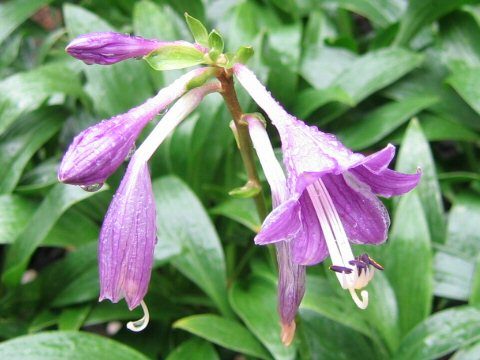
- Hosta clausa var. ensata (syn. var. normalis)

Scientific classification
- Kingdom: Plantae
- Clade: Tracheophytes
- Clade: Angiosperms
- Clade: Monocots
- Order: Asparagales
- Family: Asparagaceae
- Subfamily: Agavoideae
- Genus: Hosta
- Species: H. clausa

Binomial name
- Hosta clausa Nakai

= Hosta clausa =

Species of flowering plant

Hosta clausa is a medium-sized flowering plant in the genus Hosta, native to Korea, Manchuria and Primorye in the Russian Far East. It was first identified in 1930.

The name comes from the latin word "clausa", meaning "closed". It describes the plant's flowers that do not open.

== Description ==
Hosta clausa is known for its vibrant purple flower buds. It has a rhizomatous growth habit.

The foliage consists of lance-shaped leaves that are about one inch wide. They're deep green in colour with a glossy surface and a sharply pointed tip. The flower scapes, or stalks, bear numerous dark purple buds and exhibit purple dots near their base.

As a triploid hosta, this variety does not produce seeds. However, its pollen remains fertile, allowing it to participate in cross-pollination with other hosta species.
