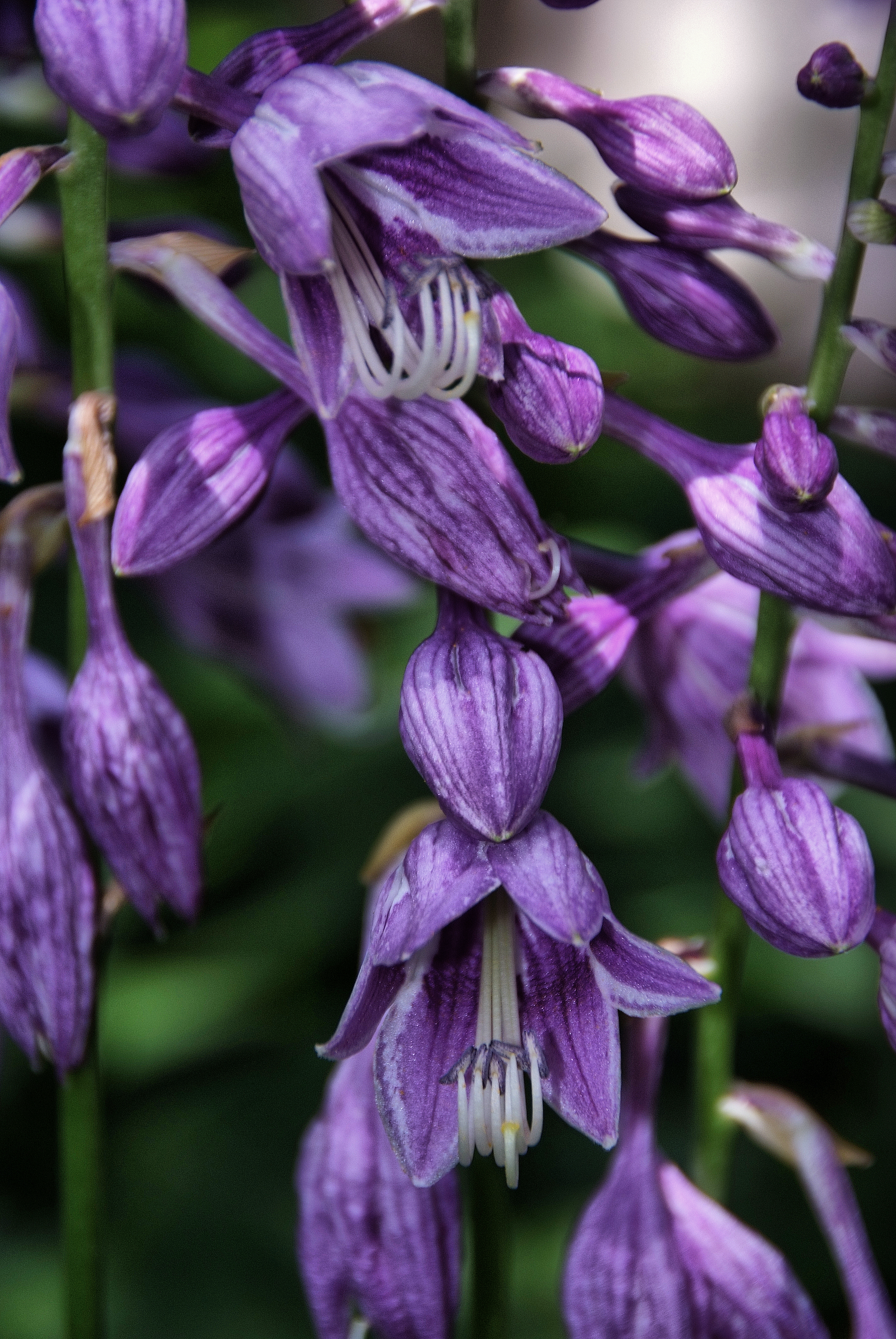
- Close-up of flowers
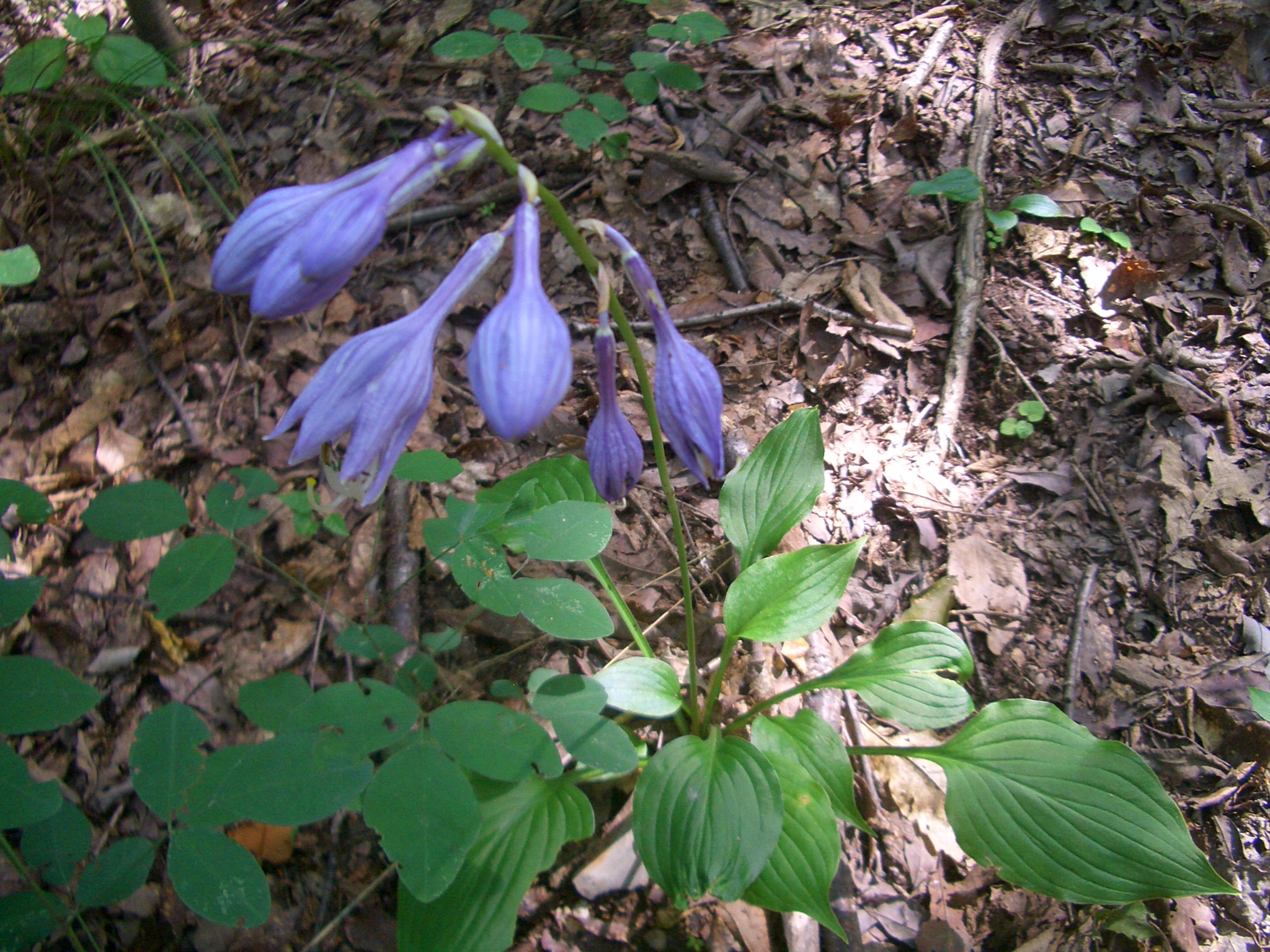
- In the wild in China

Scientific classification
- Kingdom: Plantae
- Clade: Embryophytes
- Clade: Tracheophytes
- Clade: Angiosperms
- Clade: Monocots
- Order: Asparagales
- Family: Asparagaceae
- Subfamily: Agavoideae
- Genus: Hosta
- Species: H. ventricosa

Binomial name
- Hosta ventricosa Stearn

Synonyms
- List: Bryocles ventricosa Salisb.; Funkia caerulea (Andrews) Sweet; Funkia lanceolata Siebold ex Miq.; Funkia latifolia Miq.; Funkia marginata Siebold ex Miq.; Funkia ovata Spreng.; Funkia spathulata Siebold ex Miq.; Funkia viridimarginata Siebold ex Miq.; Hosta caerulea (Andrews) Tratt.; Hosta miquelii Moldenke; Niobe caerulea (Andrews) Nash; Saussurea caerulea (Andrews) Salisb.; Hemerocallis caerulea Andrews

= Hosta ventricosa =

Species of flowering plant

Hosta ventricosa, the blue plantain lily, is a species of flowering plant in the family Asparagaceae, native to southeast and south-central China, and introduced to the eastern United States. It reproduces by pseudogamous apomixis. It is a perennial herb growing up to 3 feet (0.91 metres) tall.
