= Hosta albofarinosa =

Scientific classification
- Kingdom: Plantae
- Clade: Tracheophytes
- Clade: Angiosperms
- Clade: Monocots
- Order: Asparagales
- Family: Asparagaceae
- Subfamily: Agavoideae
- Genus: Hosta
- Species: H. albofarinosa

Binomial name
- Hosta albofarinosa D.Q.Wang

Species of flowering plant

Hosta albofarinosa is a species of flowering plant in the genus Hosta, family Asparagaceae. It is endemic to southeast China.
