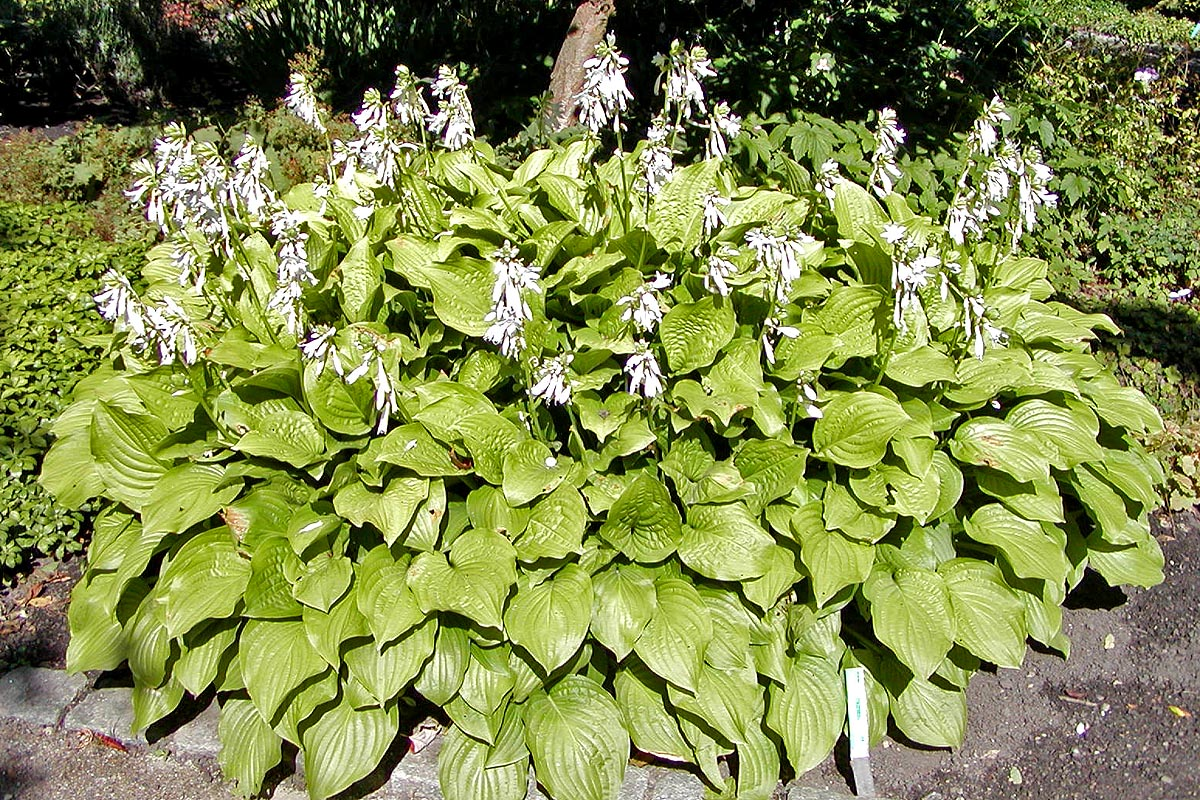
- In bloom, as is typical, in August
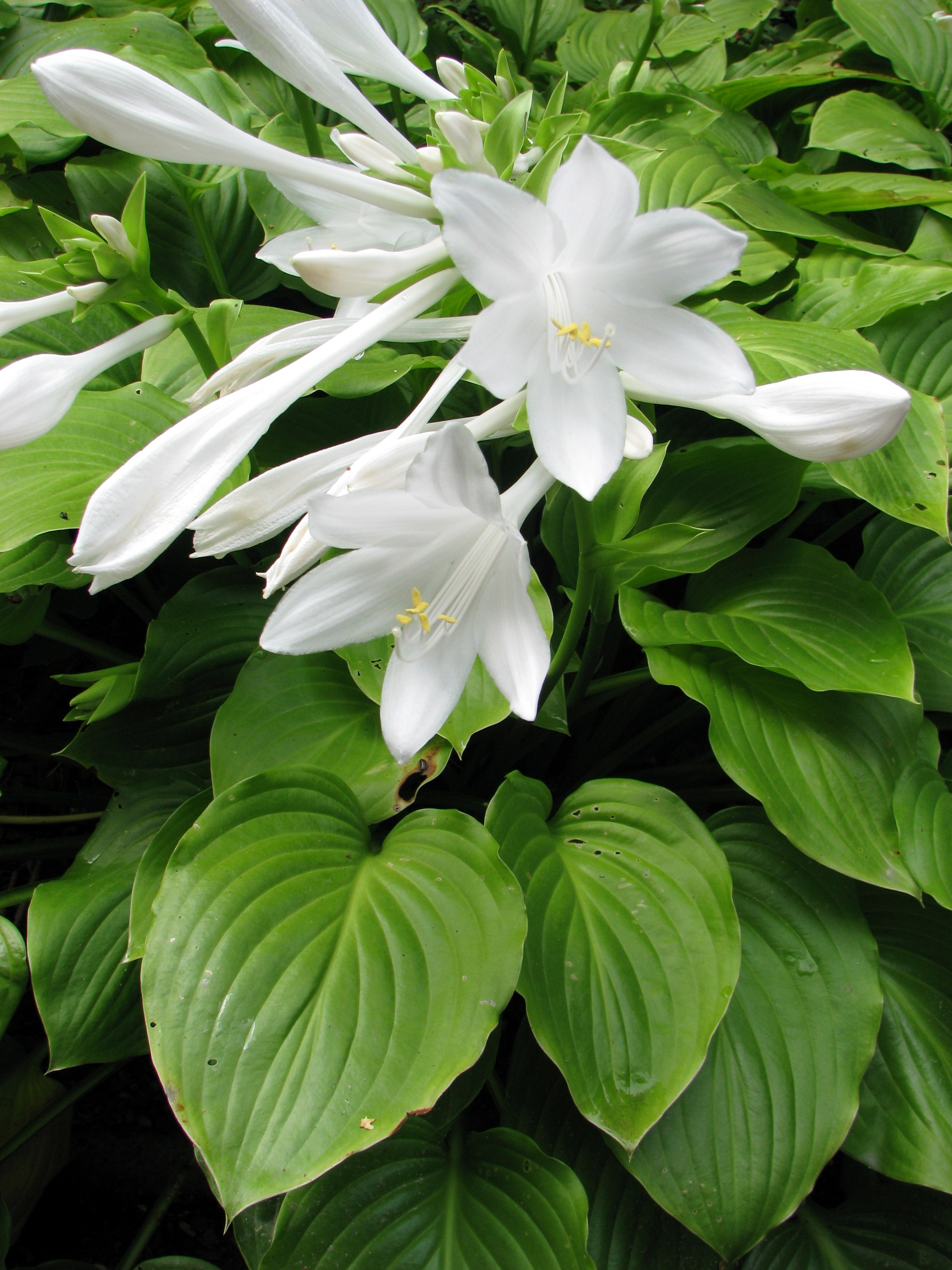
- Flowers

Scientific classification
- Kingdom: Plantae
- Clade: Tracheophytes
- Clade: Angiosperms
- Clade: Monocots
- Order: Asparagales
- Family: Asparagaceae
- Subfamily: Agavoideae
- Genus: Hosta
- Species: H. plantaginea

Binomial name
- Hosta plantaginea (Lam.) Asch.

Synonyms
- List: Funkia alba (Andrews) Sweet; Funkia cordata Siebold ex Steud.; Funkia grandiflora Siebold & Zucc. ex Lem.; Funkia japonica (Thunb.) Druce; Funkia legendrei H.Lév.; Funkia subcordata Spreng.; Hosta japonica Tratt.; Niobe cordifolia Salisb.; Niobe plantaginea (Lam.) Nash; Saussurea japonica (Thunb.) Kuntze; Saussurea plantaginea (Lam.) Kuntze; Hemerocallis alba Andrews; Hemerocallis cordata Cav.; Hemerocallis japonica Thunb.; Hemerocallis plantaginea Lam.

= Hosta plantaginea =

Species of plant

Hosta plantaginea, commonly called Fragrant plantain lily or August lily, is a species of flowering plant within the Asparagaceae family. It is native to southeast and central China. It can also be found widely as a garden plant, and is introduced in areas of Europe, Asia, and North America. Hostas require little effort to cultivate. They prefer soil with a high organic matter content and partial shade.

Hostas do not require a lot of effort to maintain. They can be planted in a highly organic soil and left mostly on it own.

== Distribution ==
Hosta plantaginea is native to South Central China and Southeast China. It is doubtfully present in North Central China and Manchuria. It has been introduced in the Czech Republic, Slovakia, Japan, Korea, Pennsylvania, Romania, South European Russia and Uzbekistan.

== Soil preference ==
The plant prefers moist soil with good drainage and a high concentration of organic matter. Its sunlight preferences are partial shade (2-6 hours of direct sun) in warmer climates and full sun (six or more hours of direct sun) in cooler climates. Hostas require organic matter to have the best chance at growth. Hostas prefer a slightly acidic soil composition but they can survive in acidic/alkaline soils. these plants can be planted and do not need a lot of attention. To give it the best chances it should be planted in soil as deep as the original container. Then ensure it receives the proper of water.

== Description ==
Hosta plants are phenotypically varied in a great range of leaf shapes, leaf sizes, leaf colors, and flower colors. They are described as being pure and near white, and pale lavender.
