= Hosta 'Undulata' =

Flowering plant cultivar

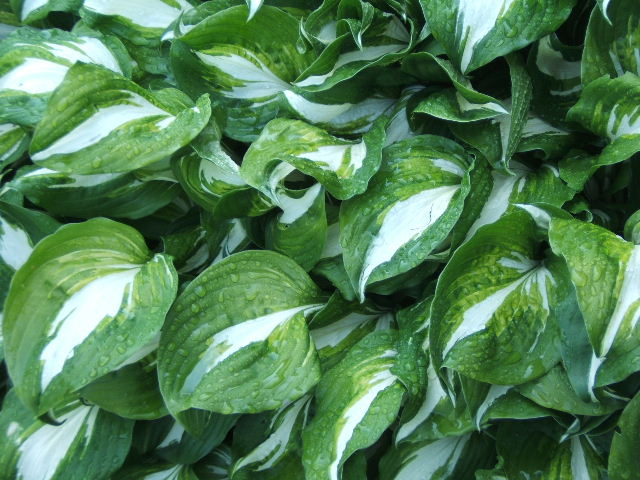
- Hosta 'Undulata' (medio-variegated)
- Hybrid parentage: see text
- Cultivar: 'Undulata'

Hosta 'Undulata' is a cultivar of the genus Hosta, widely cultivated as ornamental plants in borders or as specimen plants. It was formerly regarded as a species under the name Hosta undulata (Otto & A.Dietr.) L.H.Bailey. It is not accepted as a species by the World Checklist of Selected Plant Families as of August 2011, and has been relegated to cultivar status by Schmid.

Tolerating temperatures as low as −30 °C (−22 °F), H. 'Undulata' and its related cultivars are widely grown in temperate zones. Garden performance is best in partial to moderate shade, in well-drained moist soil.

Hostas in the 'Undulata' group include an all-green cultivar, 'Undulata Erromena'; a white-edged cultivar, 'Undulata Albomarginata'; and white-centered (medio-variegated) cultivars that may be grouped according to the amount of white in the leaf. The typical H. 'Undulata' has a wide white center, wider than the green of the margins. Over time (or as a cultivar selection), the white center can narrow to a form classified as H. 'Undulata Univittata'; the displayed picture is more of this type. These four are the only registered Undulata cultivar names. Other names for the white-centered forms include Undulata variegata, Undulata mediopicta, and registered forms such as H. 'Middle Ridge' and 'White Feather'. The expansion of the green margins (narrowing of the center) depends on garden culture. In time, the all-green 'Undulata Erromena' cultivar may appear. As this all-green form is significantly more vigorous than the variegated form, it can quickly overwhelm a planting of 'Undulata'. Division of the fast-growing clumps to remove undesired leaf forms is easily accomplished.

In areas with significant summer heat, or where planted in too much light, the white-centered forms are also prone to a greening of the leaf centers, shown as a misting that darkens with the season. This is typical behavior and not indicative of disease or mutation. The substance of the leaves is among the thinnest of hostas, making them particularly subject to slug damage. All hostas are attractive to deer.

The flower scapes of all H. 'Undulata' cultivars are tall and offer pale lavender blossoms which are very attractive to bees. The flowers for the various 'Undulata' cultivars are essentially similar. These cultivars are effectively sterile and do not generally set seed either by self-pollination or by attempted hybridization.

The variety listed as Hosta undulata var. undulata has gained the Royal Horticultural Society's Award of Garden Merit.
