= Tobacco rattle virus =

- Electron micrograph of TRV particles in two types

Virus classification
- (unranked): Virus
- Realm: Riboviria
- Kingdom: Orthornavirae
- Phylum: Kitrinoviricota
- Class: Alsuviricetes
- Order: Martellivirales
- Family: Virgaviridae
- Genus: Tobravirus
- Species: Tobravirus tabaci

Synonyms
- Aster ringspot virus; Belladonna mosaic virus; Paeony mosaic virus; Paeony ringspot virus; Potato corky ringspot virus; Potato stem mottle virus; Stengelbonk virus; Ratel virus; Tabakmauche virus; Tabakstreifen- und Kräuselkrankheit virus; Spinach yellow mottle virus; Tulip white streak virus

Species of virus

Tobacco rattle virus (TRV) is a pathogenic plant virus. Over 400 species of plants from 50 families are susceptible to infection.

The virus causes the plant disease tobacco rattle in many plants, including many ornamental flowers including Narcissus. It causes the disease corky ringspot in potatoes. The disease manifests in various ways, and signs can include brown rings and arcs on the surface of a potato, and discolored spots on the interior.

Nematodes of the family Trichodoridae, the stubby-root nematodes, are vectors of the virus. The nematode species Paratrichodorus minor, for example, introduces the virus when it feeds on the roots of plants. The virus can also be spread on garden tools. It can also be mechanically and seed transmitted.

== Hosts and symptoms ==
Boning first discovered Tobacco rattle virus in 1931 in Germany. It was discovered in Nicotiana tabacum, which is a species of cultivated tobacco.

Classic mottling and necrotic fleck (rattle) symptoms in an infected tobacco plant

Tobacco rattle virus is common and potentially serious in a variety of herbaceous ornamentals including, but not limited to, astilbe, bleeding heart, coral bells, daffodil, epimedium, gladiolus, hyacinth, marigold, tulip and vinca. Tobacco rattle can also affect vegetable crops such as beans, beets, peppers, potatoes, and spinach. On potatoes, the disease is referred to as corky ring spot. The disease corky ringspot of potatoes was first reported in the United States in 1946, and was identified incorrectly as a novel virus until advances in genetics demonstrated it to be the result of TRV.

Symptoms of Tobacco rattle virus vary based on the plant host, which differs widely in this disease. Common symptoms include mottling, chlorotic or necrotic local lesion, ringspots or line patterns, and systemic necrosis.

== Disease cycle ==
Tobacco rattle virus is a Tobravirus on plants. Transmission of Tobravirus is mostly supported by nematodes, such as Trichodorus and Paratrichodorus. These species of nematodes are known as stubby root nematodes. Transmission of the virus is separated into four distinct steps: Acquisition, absorption, retention, and virus particle release. At the beginning of the feeding cycle, the Stubby-Root Nematode punctures multiple individual cells by using its specialized stylet, an onchiostyle. Among those penetrated cells, the nematode select a cell which it will feed on. Upon selection, the nematodes begin sucking up cell contents, leading to death of the cell. During this process, adsorption of Tobravirus begins, the process where cytoplasm of infected cells containing Tobravirus is assimilated into the nematodes. Both juvenile and adult nematodes can pick up Tobravirus particles. Once the Tobravirus has been transferred into the nematodes, the retention portion of the lifecycle begins. Tobravirus consumed by the nematodes could linger in the nematodes for years. Eventually, the nematode loaded with Tobravirus starts its feeding cycle on uninfected root cell. During this period, Tobravirus will be transferred into the new cell, completing the virus transmission.

An Interesting feature of the life cycle of stubby root nematodes is that they reproduce in the absence of sexual activity. Because the nematode does not require sexual activity for reproduction, male nematodes are rarely detected. As a result, female nematodes lay eggs without sexual activity. The eggs hatch to begin the lifecycle of the nematode. Juvenile nematodes undergo molting three times until they reach the adult stage. Then, the life cycle begins again.

== Environment ==
Tobacco rattle virus is dependent on the nematodes’ activity. Therefore, environmental factors that support nematodes’ movement or life cycle would lead to successful dispersal of this virus. One such environmental inducer is high soil moisture. Nematodes are obligate parasites; this means the nematode requires a host to survive. High soil moisture enables the nematodes to move more easily in the soil. With high soil moisture, nematodes also have better access to the root or root hairs, which enables them to easily transmit the pathogen on those cells. Moderately warm temperature allows faster life cycle of the nematode; If temperature were at optimum for nematode's life cycle, there would be a greater chance of dispersal of Tobravirus along the host plant.

== Management ==
Tobacco rattle virus can be managed through a variety of methods designed to make the environment unsuitable for transmission and viral propagation. Tubers or seeds of any susceptible plants should be purchased only from sellers certified as clean, and never planted in fields with a history of corky ringspot or Tobacco rattle virus-related disease. Many US states and several other countries run seed certification programs, for potatoes in particular. While its use requires a permit from many state or local governments, the nematicide 1,3-dichloropropene may be employed against fields overrun by stubby root nematodes, a common vector of the virus. Soil fumigants generally fail to penetrate the 40 inches necessary to ensure nematode eradication, and carbamates such as aldicarb and oxamyl are recommended as a last resort. Tobacco rattle virus is only found in nature in association with stubby root nematodes of genera Trichodorus and Paratrichodorus. Although otherwise considered harmless, they spread the infection during feedings. Nematodes may live and multiply within weeds in the field in between crop rotations, and it is advisable to employ non-host plants, such as alfalfa, to compete against weeds that may otherwise harbor the viral vector. In contrast, nightshade is a very problematic weed as it is an ideal host for the virus and the nematode. Growers can reduce symptom development by planting early and harvesting early. While the Russet Burbank cultivar proves to be highly susceptible to Tobacco rattle virus corky ringspot, Merrimack and several old European varieties exhibit resistance. Too much soil moisture can encourage nematode overpopulation, but tightly packed fine soil, clay, or sand can drastically inhibit the vector movement responsible for widespread and erratic field decimations. Once a plant is infected it cannot be treated and should be burned or disposed of as biohazard waste.

== Importance ==
Tobacco rattle virus infects hundreds of plant species and is found in every continent where crops are grown. In the United States, it has been reported in Florida, Michigan, Wisconsin, Minnesota, Colorado, Idaho, Oregon, Washington, and California. Yet, no significant studies have been published examining the actual impact TRV leaves on agricultural sectors. Corky ringspot from TRV has been known to cut yields from 6-55 percent in the Pacific Northwest, rendering those affected crops unmarketable. Other than severe cosmetic damage to the tuber crops, however, corky ringspot disease from Tobacco rattle virus is not considered highly damaging to potato yields. TRV is commonly used in studies involving transgenic plants as a vector for silencing specified target genes. Thus, it is an important tool to plant physiologists and in the field of plant developmental genetics. Such research is important in creating "cross-protected" plants that are resistant or immune to the effects of the virus.
