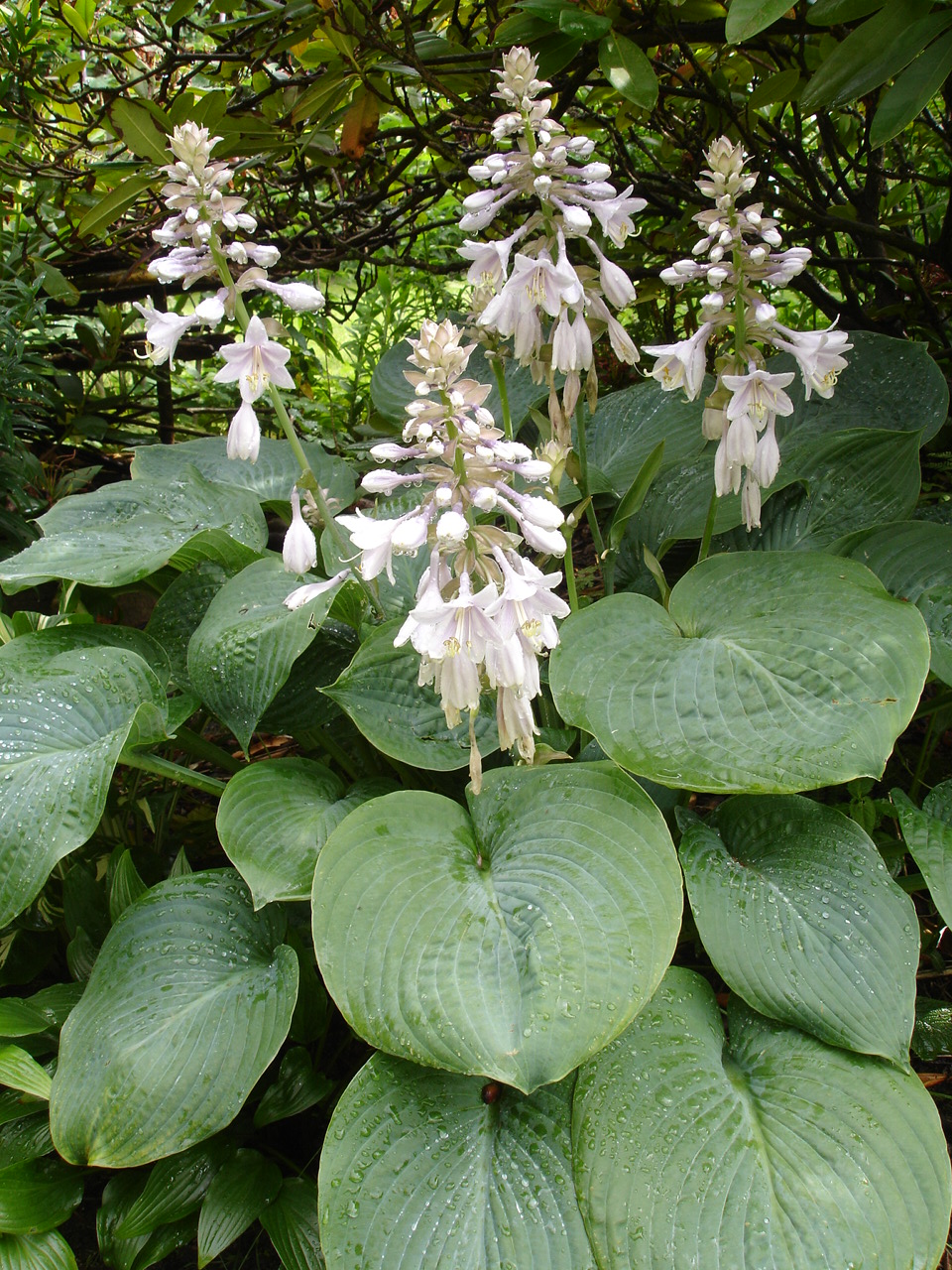

Scientific classification
- Kingdom: Plantae
- Clade: Embryophytes
- Clade: Tracheophytes
- Clade: Spermatophytes
- Clade: Angiosperms
- Clade: Monocots
- Order: Asparagales
- Family: Asparagaceae
- Subfamily: Agavoideae
- Genus: Hosta
- Species: H. sieboldiana

Binomial name
- Hosta sieboldiana (Hook.) Engl.

Synonyms
- List: Funkia fortunei Baker; Funkia glauca Siebold ex Miq.; Funkia maculata Siebold ex Miq.; Funkia sieboldiana Hook.; Funkia sieboldii Lindl.; Funkia univittata Siebold ex Miq.; Hemerocallis sieboldiana G.Lodd.; Hosta bella H.R.Wehrh.; Hosta crassifolia Araki; Hosta crispula F.Maek.; Hosta cucullata (Witte) Koidz.; Hosta elata Hyl.; Hosta fluctuans F.Maek.; Hosta fortunei (Baker) L.H.Bailey; Hosta gigantea Koidz.; Hosta glauca (Siebold ex Miq.) Stearn; Hosta liliiflora (F.Maek.) Araki; Hosta mira F.Maek.; Hosta montana f. macrophylla W.G.Schmid; Hosta montana f. ovatolancifolia (Araki) W.G.Schmid; Hosta montana F.Maek.; Hosta tokudama F.Maek.; Niobe fortunei (Baker) Nash; Niobe sieboldiana (Hook.) Nash; Saussurea sieboldiana (Hook.) Kuntze

= Hosta sieboldiana =

Species of flowering plant

Hosta sieboldiana, Siebold's plantain lily, is a species of hosta native to Japan. A putative variety, Hosta sieboldiana var. elegans (called the giant blue hosta), has gained the Royal Horticultural Society's Award of Garden Merit, as has a putative variety of its synonym; Hosta fortunei var. aureomarginata, the gold-edged plantain lily. The cultivars 'Blue Angel', 'Blue Mammoth', and 'Olive Bailey Langdon' have also gained the RHS Award of Garden Merit.

== Varieties ==
Two varieties are accepted:

- Hosta sieboldiana var. glabra N.Fujita
- Hosta sieboldiana var. sieboldiana
