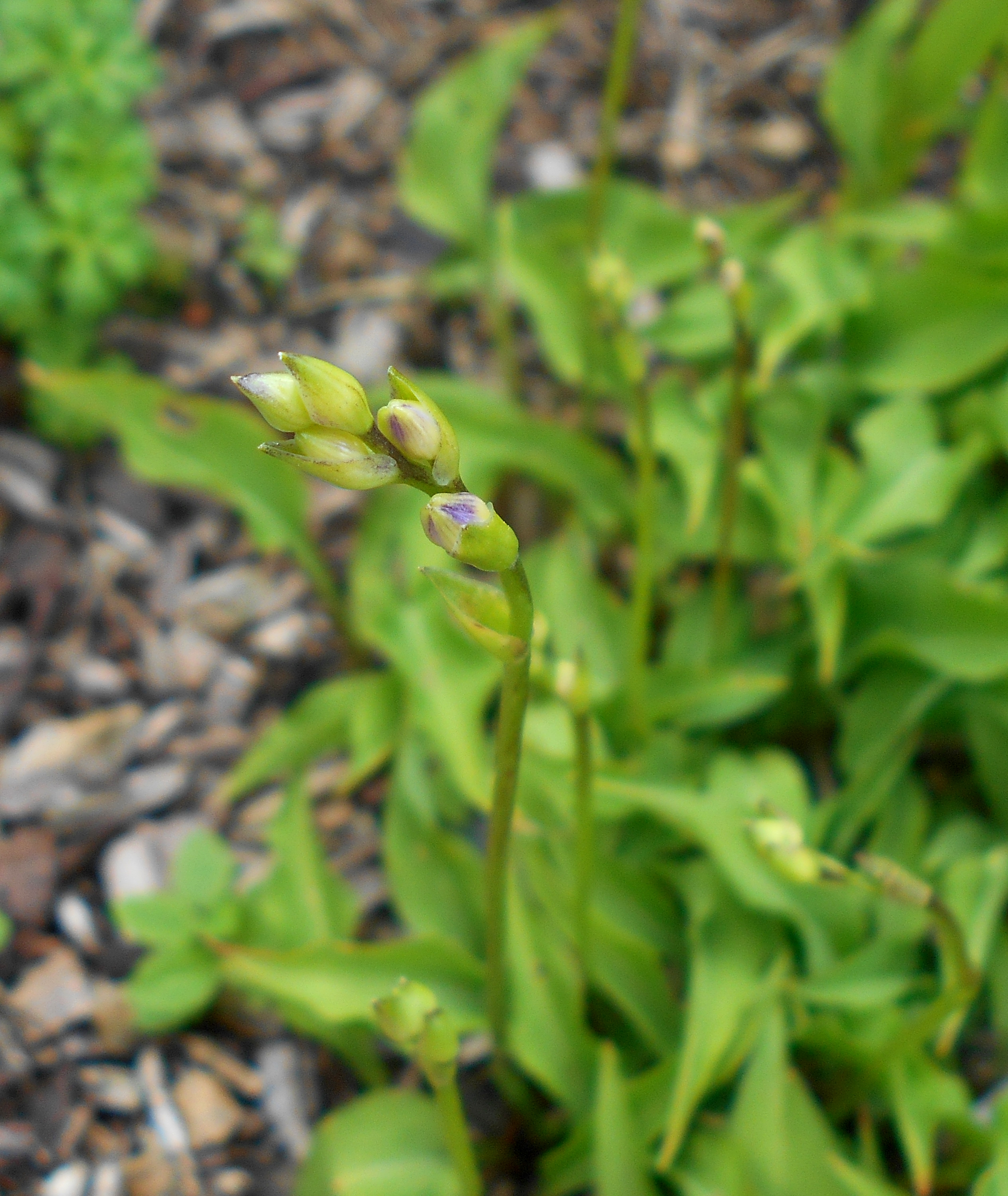

Scientific classification
- Kingdom: Plantae
- Clade: Tracheophytes
- Clade: Angiosperms
- Clade: Monocots
- Order: Asparagales
- Family: Asparagaceae
- Subfamily: Agavoideae
- Genus: Hosta
- Species: H. minor

Binomial name
- Hosta minor (Baker) Nakai

Synonyms
- Hosta minor f. albiflora M.Kim

= Hosta minor =

Species of plant

Hosta minor is a species of flowering plant in the Asparagaceae family. It is one of the smallest hostas. It is also known as Hosta sieboldii 'Alba'.
