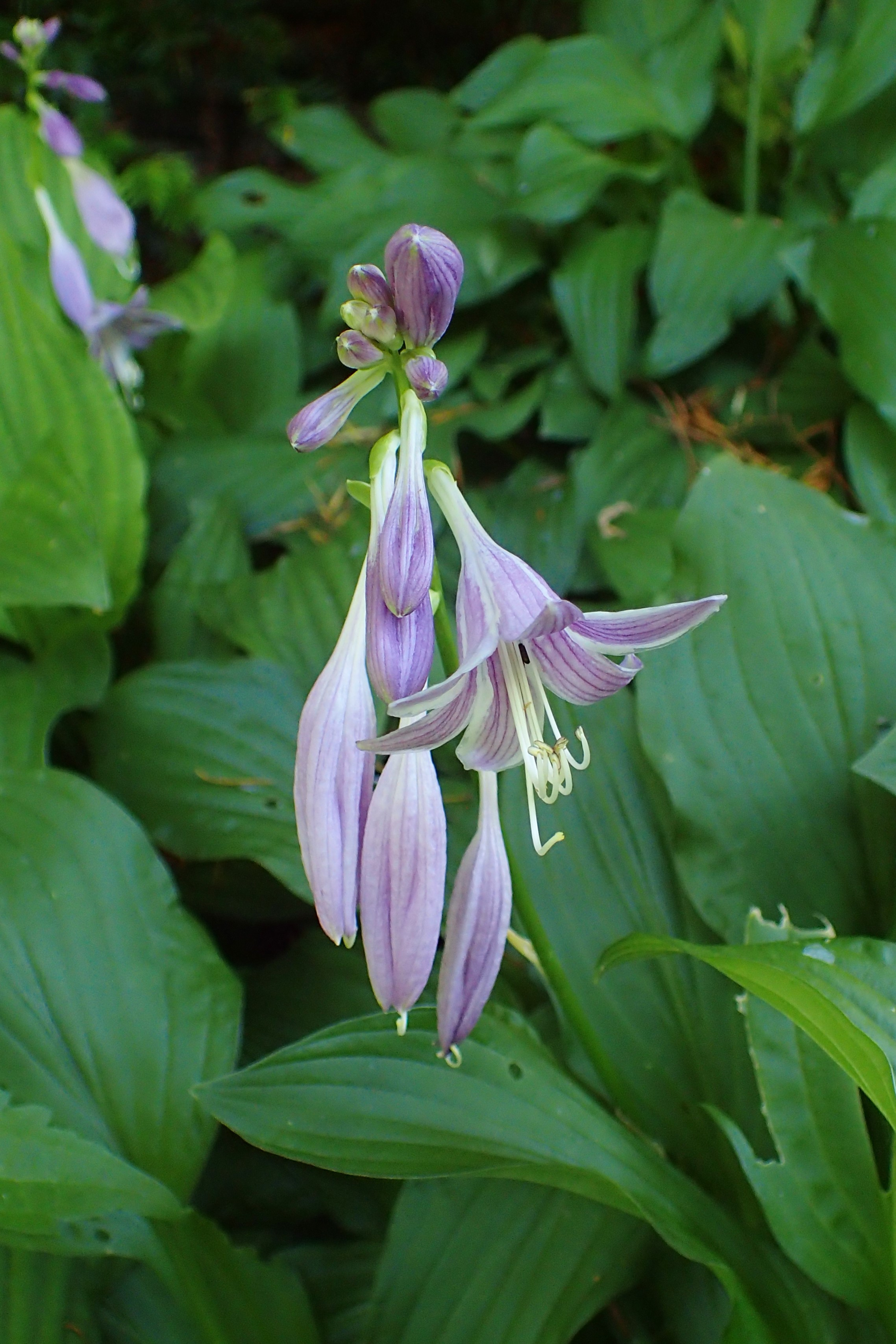
- At the botanical garden of Maria Curie-Skłodowska University

Scientific classification
- Kingdom: Plantae
- Clade: Embryophytes
- Clade: Tracheophytes
- Clade: Spermatophytes
- Clade: Angiosperms
- Clade: Monocots
- Order: Asparagales
- Family: Asparagaceae
- Subfamily: Agavoideae
- Genus: Hosta
- Species: H. sieboldii

Binomial name
- Hosta sieboldii (Paxton) J.W.Ingram

Synonyms
- List: Funkia albomarginata Hook.; Hosta albomarginata (Hook.) Ohwi; Hosta atropurpurea Nakai; Hosta calliantha Araki; Hosta campanulata Araki; Hosta clavata F.Maek.; Hosta decorata L.H.Bailey; Hosta decorata f. albiflora J.Ohara; Hosta harunaensis Honda; Hosta ibukiensis Araki; Hosta intermedia (Makino) F.Maek.; Hosta okamii F.Maek.; Hosta opipara F.Maek.; Hosta rectifolia Nakai; Hosta rectifolia var. australis F.Maek. ex W.G.Schmid; Hosta sachalinensis Koidz.; Hosta sieboldii f. alba (Rob.) H.Hara; Hosta sieboldii f. albiflora (Tatew.) H.Hara; Hosta sieboldii f. angustifolia (Regel) W.G.Schmid; Hosta sieboldii f. atropurpurea (Nakai) H.Hara; Hosta sieboldii f. campanulata (Araki) W.G.Schmid; Hosta sieboldii f. chionea (F.Maek.) H.Hara; Hosta sieboldii var. intermedia (Makino) H.Hara; Hosta sieboldii f. kabitan (F.Maek.) H.Hara; Hosta sieboldii f. leucantha (Koji Ito) H.Hara; Hosta sieboldii f. mediopicta (F.Maek.) H.Hara; Hosta sieboldii f. okamii (F.Maek.) H.Hara; Hosta sieboldii f. polycarpellata (F.Maek.) H.Hara; Hosta sieboldii f. pruinosa (F.Maek.) H.Hara; Hosta sieboldii var. rectifolia (Nakai) H.Hara; Hosta sieboldii f. spathulata (Miq.) W.G.Schmid; Hosta sieboldii f. subchrocea (F.Maek.) H.Hara; Hemerocallis albomarginata (Hook.) H.Vilm.

= Hosta sieboldii =

Species of flowering plant

Hosta sieboldii, the small-leaved plantain lily, is a species of flowering plant in the family Asparagaceae, native to Sakhalin, the Kurils, and Japan. A number of cultivars are available.
