= Trichodoridae =

Scientific classification
- Kingdom: Animalia
- Phylum: Nematoda
- Class: Enoplea
- Order: Triplonchida
- Suborder: Diphtherophorina
- Family: Trichodoridae (Thorne) Clark

Type genus
- Trichodorus Cobb, 1913

Genera
- See text

Family of roundworms

Trichodoridae (stubby-root nematodes, trichodorids) is a family of terrestrial root feeding nematodes, being one of two that constitute suborder Triplonchida. They are economically important plant parasites and virus vectors.

== Taxonomy ==
The first trichodorid was described in 1880 (De Man) as Dorylaimus primitivus, and the type genus, Trichodorus described in 1913 by Cobb, based on Trichodorus obtusus.

=== Subdivision ===
Historically, up to 1973, Trichodorus was the only genus in this family. Originally it was the only genus in a subfamily, the Trichodorinae Thorne 1935, within the family Diphtherophoridae, to distinguish it from the other subfamily, Diphtherophorinae. However Diphtherophoridae was elevated to superfamily rank, and the subfamily Trichodorinae became a full-fledged family. The genus Trichodorus was split into two genera in 1974 by Siddiqi, Trichodorus and Paratrichodorus. This was based on the position of the gland nuclei and the type of pharyngo-intestinal junction. Siddiqi also used these criteria to divide Paratrichodirus into three subgenera, Paratrichodorus, Atlantadorus and Nanidorus. Rodriguez-Montessorosoon proposed further separating these genera into two subfamilies, resurrecting the name Trichodorinae. With Siddiqi's subgenera not accepted by all authorities, his elevation of these subgenera to genus level in 1980 was followed by even fewer, but now is finding supports in molecular systematics.

=== Phylogenetics ===
In the case of Nanidorus, phylogenetic analysis has supported its recognition as a separate genus, although clustering with Trichodorus rather than its parent Paratrichodorus.

=== Genera ===
There were few species recognised before the economic importance of the family was recognised, and in 1957 there were only 12, but this increased rapidly. In addition further genera than the original Trichodorus (1913) and Paratrichodorus (1974) were created in the 1970s, and another genus in 2002.

There are now about 100 species divided into five to six genera. Duarte et al. (2010) list 102 species.

- Allotrichodorus Rodriguez-M, Sher and Siddiqi, 1978 (6 species)
- Ecuadorus Siddiqi, 2002 (2 species)
- Monotrichodorus Andrassy, 1976 (4 species)
- Nanidorus Siddiqi, 1974
- Paratrichodorus Siddiqi, 1974 (34 species)
- Trichodorus Cobb, 1913 (54 species)

The two largest genera have didelphic females (two genital tracts), and are distributed worldwide. In the contrast the three small genera, have females that are monodelphic-prodelphic (single tract) and are native to Central America and the northern part of South America.

=== Etymology ===
Trichodoridae comes from the Greek trichos (a hair) and dory (a spear). The name "stubby-root" comes from the effect of the nematodes on the root system which appears "stubby" or stunted.

== Plant pathology ==
The family only became of interest in 1951. At that time Trichodorus christie (=Paratrichodorus minor) was recognised as a pest of crops (beets and corn) in Florida. In 1961 it was discovered that they were also virus vectors, though this seems to be mainly the didelphic genera.

== Bibliography ==
=== Books ===
- Lee, Donald L, ed. (2010). The biology of nematodes. London: Taylor & Francis. ISBN 978-0415272117.
- Decraemer, W. (1995). The family Trichodoridae: stubby root and virus vector nematodes. Dordrecht: Kluwer Academic Publishers. ISBN 978-0792337737.
  - DECRAEMER, W. & BAUJARD, P., 1998. Additions and corrections to: Decraemer: The Family Trichodoridae. Fundamental and Applied Nematology 21 (2): 207-212.
- Zhang, Zhi-Qiang, ed. (2011). Animal biodiversity : an outline of higher-level classification and survey of taxonomic richness. Auckland, N.Z.: Magnolia Press. ISBN 978-1869778491.
- Zuckerman, B.N.; Mai, W.F.; Rohde, R.A., eds. (1971). Plant Parasitic Nematodes: Volume I. Morphology, Anatomy, Taxonomy, and Ecology. Oxford: Elsevier Science. ISBN 978-0323154246.
- Perry, Roland N.; Moens, Maurice, eds. (2013). Plant nematology (2 ed.). Boston, MA: CABI. ISBN 978-1780641515.

=== Articles ===
- Blaxter, Mark L.; De Ley, Paul; Garey, James R.; Liu, Leo X.; Scheldeman, Patsy; Vierstraete, Andy; Vanfleteren, Jacques R.; Mackey, Laura Y.; Dorris, Mark; Frisse, Linda M.; Vida, J. T.; Thomas, W. Kelley (5 March 1998). "A molecular evolutionary framework for the phylum Nematoda". Nature. 392 (6671): 71–75. Bibcode:1998Natur.392...71B. doi:10.1038/32160. PMID 9510248. S2CID 4301939.
- De Ley, P & Blaxter, M 2004, 'A new system for Nematoda: combining morphological characters with molecular trees, and translating clades into ranks and taxa'. in R Cook & DJ Hunt (eds), Nematology Monographs and Perspectives. vol. 2, E.J. Brill, Leiden, pp. 633–653.
- Siddiqi, M.R. (1974). "Systematics of the genus Trichodorus Cobb, 1913 (Nematoda: Dorylaimida), with descriptions of three new species". Nematologica. 19: 259–278.
- Duarte, Isabel; Neilson, Roy; Decraemer, Wilfrida; Brown, Derek; de Almeida, Maria Teresa M.; Marques (1 February 2010). "Phylogenetic relationships, based on SSU rDNA sequences, among the didelphic genera of the family Trichodoridae from Portugal". Nematology. 12 (2): 171–180. doi:10.1163/156854109X461721. hdl:1822/18363.
- Kumari, S.; Subbotin, S. A. (December 2012). "Molecular characterization and diagnostics of stubby root and virus vector nematodes of the family Trichodoridae (Nematoda: Triplonchida) using ribosomal RNA genes". Plant Pathology. 61 (6): 1021–1031. doi:10.1111/j.1365-3059.2012.02598.x.
