= Triplonchida =

Scientific classification
- Kingdom: Animalia
- Phylum: Nematoda
- Class: Enoplea
- Subclass: Enoplia
- Order: Triplonchida; Cobb, 1920

Suborders
- Diphtherophorina; Tobrilina; Tripylina

Order of roundworms

Triplonchida is an order of terrestrial nematodes, and is one of two orders making up the subclass Enoplia.

== Taxonomy ==
There are three suborders:

- Diphtherophorina
- Tobrilina
- Tripylina

== Bibliography ==
- Blaxter, Mark L.; De Ley, Paul; Garey, James R.; Liu, Leo X.; Scheldeman, Patsy; Vierstraete, Andy; Vanfleteren, Jacques R.; Mackey, Laura Y.; Dorris, Mark; Frisse, Linda M.; Vida, J. T.; Thomas, W. Kelley (5 March 1998). "A molecular evolutionary framework for the phylum Nematoda". Nature. 392 (6671): 71–75. doi:10.1038/32160. PMID 9510248. S2CID 4301939.
- Lee, Donald L, ed. (2010). The biology of nematodes. London: Taylor & Francis. ISBN 978-0415272117.
- De Ley, P & Blaxter, M 2004, 'A new system for Nematoda: combining morphological characters with molecular trees, and translating clades into ranks and taxa'. in R Cook & DJ Hunt (eds), Nematology Monographs and Perspectives. vol. 2, E.J. Brill, Leiden, pp. 633–653.
