= List of cucurbit diseases =

This article is a list of diseases of cucurbits (Citrullus spp., Cucumis spp., Cucurbita spp., and others).

== Bacterial diseases ==
Bacterial diseases
Angular leaf spot	Pseudomonas amygdali pv. lachrymans
Bacterial fruit blotch/seedling blight	Acidovorax avenae subsp. citrulli = Pseudomonas pseudoalcaligenes subsp. citrulli
Bacterial leaf spot	Xanthomonas campestris pv. cucurbitae
Bacterial rind necrosis	Erwinia spp.
Bacterial soft rot	Erwinia carotovora subsp. carotovora
Bacterial wilt	Erwinia tracheiphila
Brown spot	Erwinia ananas

== Fungal diseases ==
Fungal diseases
Alternaria leaf blight	Alternaria cucumerina
Alternaria leaf spot	Alternaria alternata f.sp. cucurbitae
Anthracnose (stem, leaf and fruit)	Colletotrichum orbiculare = Colletotrichum lagenarium Glomerella lagenarium [teleomorph]
Belly rot	Rhizoctonia solani Thanatephorus cucumeris [teleomorph]
Black root rot	Thielaviopsis basicola
Blue mold rot	Penicillium spp. Penicillium digitatum
Cephalosporium root and hypocotyl rot, stem streak and dieback	Acremonium spp. = Cephalosporium spp.
Cercospora leaf spot	Cercospora citrullina
Charcoal rot Vine decline and fruit rot	Macrophomina phaseolina
Choanephora fruit rot	Choanephora cucurbitarum
Collapse of melon	Monosporascus eutypoides = Bitrimonospora indica
Corynespora blight/target spot	Corynespora cassiicola
Crater rot (fruit)	Myrothecium roridum
Crown and foot rot	Fusarium solani = Haematonectria haematococca Nectria haematococca [teleomorph]
Damping-off	Acremonium spp. Fusarium spp. Fusarium equiseti Gibberella intricans[teleomorph] Phytophthora sp. Pythium spp. Rhizoctonia solani Thielaviopsis basicola Other fungi
Downy mildew	Pseudoperonospora cubensis
Fusarium fruit rot	Fusarium equiseti = Fusarium roseum f. gibbosum Fusarium graminearum Gibberella zeae [teleomorph] Fusarium semitectum Fusarium solani f. sp. cucurbitae Fusarium spp.
Fusarium wilt	Fusarium oxysporum (with these formae speciales:); Fusarium oxysporum f.sp. benincasae Fusarium oxysporum f.sp. cucumerinum Fusarium oxysporum f.sp. lagenariae Fusarium oxysporum f.sp. luffae Fusarium oxysporum f.sp. melonis Fusarium oxysporum f.sp. momordicae Fusarium oxysporum f.sp. niveum
Gray mold	Botrytis cinerea Botryotinia fuckeliana [teleomorph]
Gummy stem blight (vine decline)	Didymella bryoniae = Mycosphaerella melonis Phoma cucurbitacearum [anamorph]
Lasiodiplodia vine decline/fruit rot	Lasiodiplodia theobromae = Diplodia natalensis
Monosporascus root rot/Myrothecium canker (black canker)	Monosporascus cannonballus Myrothecium roridum
Net spot	Leandria momordicae
Phoma blight	Phoma exigua var. exigua = Ascochyta phaseolorum
Purple stem	Diaporthe melonis Phomopsis cucurbitae [teleomorph]
Phomopsis black stem	Phomopsis sclerotioides
Phyllosticta leaf spot	Phyllosticta cucurbitacearum
Phytophthora root rot	Phytophthora spp. Phytophthora capsici
Pink mold rot	Trichothecium roseum
Plectosporium blight	Plectosporium tabacinum
Powdery mildew	Podosphaera xanthii s.l. Golovinomyces tabaci
Pythium fruit rot (cottony leak)	Pythium spp.
Rhizopus soft rot (fruit)	Rhizopus stolonifer = Rhizopus nigricans
Scab/gummosis	Cladosporium cucumerinum
Sclerotinia stem rot	Sclerotinia sclerotiorum
Septoria leaf blight	Septoria cucurbitacearum
Southern blight (Sclerotium fruit and stem rot)	Sclerotium rolfsii Athelia rolfsii [teleomorph]
Sudden wilt	Pythium aphanidermatum
Ulocladium leaf spot	Ulocladium consortiale
Verticillium wilt	Verticillium albo-atrum Verticillium dahliae
Web blight	Rhizoctonia solani

== Miscellaneous diseases and disorders ==
Miscellaneous diseases and disorders
Air pollution injury	Ozone, sulfur dioxide and others
Bitter fruit	Sunburn injury, physiologic stress
Blossom end rot	Physiological disorder, calcium deficiency, moisture imbalance
Bottle neck of fruit	Incomplete pollination
Measles	Physiological disorder, salt toxicity
Sandburn	Physiological disorder
Sunscald (fruit)	Excessive or intense direct heat/ solar injury
Windburn	Physiological disorder

== Nematodes, parasitic ==
Nematodes, parasitic
Dagger, American	Xiphinema americanum
Lesion	Pratylenchus spp.
Pin	Paratylenchus spp.
Reniform	Rotylenchulus reniformis
Ring	Circonemella spp.
Root-knot	Meloidogyne spp.
Spiral	Helicotylenchus spp.
Sting	Belonolaimus longicaudatus
Stubby-root	Paratrichodorus minor
Stunt	Tylenchorhynchus claytoni
