= List of peanut diseases =

This article is a list of diseases of peanuts (Arachis hypogaea).

== Bacterial diseases ==
Bacterial diseases
Bacterial wilt	Pseudomonas solanacearum

== Fungal diseases ==
Fungal diseases
Alternaria leaf blight	Alternaria tenuissima
Alternaria leaf spot	Alternaria arachidis
Alternaria spot and veinal necrosis	Alternaria alternata
Anthracnose	Colletotrichum arachidis Colletotrichum dematium Colletotrichum mangenoti
Aspergillus crown rot	Aspergillus niger
Blackhull	Thielaviopsis basicola Chalara elegans [synanamorph]
Botrytis blight	Botrytis cinerea Botryotinia fuckeliana [teleomorph]
Charcoal rot and Macrophomina leaf spot	Macrophomina phaseolina = Rhizoctonia bataticola
Choanephora leaf spot	Choanephora spp.
Collar rot	Lasiodiplodia theobromae = Diplodia gossypina
Colletotrichum leaf spot	Colletotrichum gloeosporioides Glomerella cingulata [teleomorph]
Cylindrocladium black rot	Cylindrocladium crotalariae Calonectria crotalariae [teleomorph]
Cylindrocladium leaf spot	Cylindrocladium scoparium Calonectria kyotensis [teleomorph]
Damping-off, Aspergillus	Aspergillus flavus Aspergillus niger
Damping-off, Fusarium	Fusarium spp.
Damping-off, Pythium	Pythium spp.
Damping-off, Rhizoctonia	Rhizoctonia spp.
Damping-off, Rhizopus	Rhizopus spp.
Drechslera leaf spot	Bipolaris spicifera = Drechslera spicifera Cochliobolus spicifer [teleomorph]
Fusarium peg and root rot	Fusarium spp.
Fusarium wilt	Fusarium oxysporum
Leaf spot, early	Cercospora arachidicola Mycosphaerella arachidis [teleomorph]
Leaf spot, late	Phaeoisariopsis personata = Cercosporidium personatum Mycosphaerella berkeleyi [teleomorph]
Melanosis	Stemphylium botryosum Pleospora tarda [teleomorph]
Myrothecium leaf blight	Myrothecium roridum
Olpidium root rot	Olpidium brassicae
Pepper spot and scorch	Leptosphaerulina crassiasca
Pestalotiopsis leaf spot	Pestalotiopsis arachidis
Phoma leaf blight	Phoma microspora
Phomopsis foliar blight	Phomopsis phaseoli = Phomopsis sojae Diaporthe phaseolorum [teleomorph]
Phomopsis leaf spot	Phomopsis spp.
Phyllosticta leaf spot	Phyllosticta arachidis-hypogaeae Phyllosticta sojaecola Pleosphaerulina sojicola [teleomorph]
Phymatotrichum root rot	Phymatotrichopsis omnivora = Phymatotrichum omnivorum
Pod rot (pod breakdown)	Fusarium equiseti = Fusarium scirpi Gibberella intricans [teleomorph] Fusarium solani Nectria haematococca [teleomorph] Pythium myriotylum Rhizoctonia solani Thanatephorus cucumeris [teleomorph]
Powdery mildew	Oidium arachidis
Pythium peg and root rot	Pythium myriotylum Pythium aphanidermatum Pythium debaryanum Pythium irregulare Pythium ultimum
Pythium wilt	Pythium myriotylum
Rhizoctonia foliar blight, peg and root rot	Rhizoctonia solani
Rust	Puccinia arachidis
Scab	Sphaceloma arachidis
Sclerotinia blight	Sclerotinia minor Sclerotinia sclerotiorum
Stem rot (southern blight)	Sclerotium rolfsii Athelia rolfsii [teleomorph]
Verticillium wilt	Verticillium albo-atrum Verticillium dahliae
Web blotch (net blotch)	Phoma arachidicola = Ascochyta adzamethica Didymosphaeria arachidicola = Mycosphaerella arachidicola
Yellow mold	Aspergillus flavus Aspergillus parasiticus
Zonate leaf spot	Cristulariella moricola Sclerotium cinnamomi [syanamorph] Grovesinia pyramidalis [teleomorph]

== Nematodes, parasitic ==
Nematodes, parasitic
Dagger	Xiphinema spp.
Pod lesion	Tylenchorhynchus brevilineatus = Tylenchorhynchus brevicadatus
Ring	Criconemella ornata = Macroposthonia ornata
Root-knot, Javanese	Meloidogyne javanica
Root-knot, northern	Meloidogyne hapla
Root-knot, peanut	Meloidogyne arenaria
Root lesion	Pratylenchus brachyurus Pratylenchus coffeae
Seed and pod	Ditylenchus destructor
Spiral	Scutellonema cavenessi
Sting	Belonolaimus glacilis Belonolaimus longicaudatus
Testa	Aphelenchoides arachidis

== Phytoplasma, Virus and viruslike diseases ==
Virus and viruslike diseases
Cowpea mild mottle	Cowpea mild mottle virus
Groundnut crinkle	Groundnut crinkle virus
Groundnut eyespot	Groundnut eyespot virus
Groundnut rosette	Groundnut chlorotic rosette virus Groundnut green rosette virus
Groundnut streak	Groundnut streak virus
Marginal chlorosis	Unknown (viruslike)
Peanut clump	Peanut clump virus
Peanut green mosaic	Peanut green mosaic virus
Peanut mottle	Peanut mottle virus
Peanut ringspot or bud necrosis	Tomato spotted wilt virus
Peanut stripe	Peanut stripe virus
Peanut stunt	Peanut stunt virus
Peanut yellow mottle	Peanut yellow mottle virus
Tomato spotted wilt	Tomato spotted wilt virus
Witches' broom	Phytoplasma

== Miscellaneous and diseases or disorders ==
Miscellaneous and diseases or disorders
Rugose leaf curl	Rickettsia-like organism
