= Stem rot =

Plant disease

Stem rot is a category of plant diseases in which a pathogen, usually a fungus or oomycete, infects and decays the stem of a crop plant, often resulting in lodging, reduced yield or plant death. The term is applied to diseases of many different crop species and is caused by a heterogeneous group of soil-borne and seed-borne pathogens; the most economically important include several species of Sclerotinia, Phytophthora, Fusarium, Pythium and Rhizoctonia on broadacre crops and Sclerotium oryzae on rice.

== Symptoms ==
Symptoms of stem rot vary with the causal pathogen but commonly include water-soaked or discoloured lesions on the lower stem, wilting, yellowing of foliage, lodging, and partial or complete plant death. The fungus or oomycete impedes vascular transport of water and nutrients through the stem, and water may leak from lesions in stem tissue. Some pathogens produce visible signs in addition to symptoms, such as the cottony white mycelium and small black resting structures known as sclerotia characteristic of Sclerotinia sclerotiorum infection, or the dark chocolate-brown lesions that extend from below the soil line up one side of the stem in Phytophthora infections.

== Pathogens ==
=== Sclerotinia stem rot ===
Sclerotinia stem rot, also known as white mold, is caused by Sclerotinia sclerotiorum, a hemibiotrophic fungus with an unusually wide host range of more than 400 plant species.

The pathogen survives in soil as melanised sclerotia for up to five to eight years. Under cool, moist conditions during the host's flowering period, sclerotia in the upper soil profile germinate carpogenically to produce small, cup-shaped apothecia that release millions of airborne ascospores. Ascospores cannot infect healthy living tissue directly; they first colonise senescing flowers or other dead plant tissue, from which the fungus then advances into the living stem at the nodes.

=== Phytophthora root and stem rot ===
Phytophthora root and stem rot of soybean is caused by the oomycete Phytophthora sojae, and is one of the most damaging soybean diseases in the northern United States. The pathogen survives in soil as long-lived oospores, which germinate in saturated soil to release motile zoospores that swim through soil water to infect soybean roots. Infection progresses up the stem, producing a characteristic dark brown lesion extending from the soil line. Disease development is favoured by heavy, poorly drained soils and warm temperatures above 60 °F (16 °C). Phytophthora sojae is genetically diverse, with over 200 pathotypes detected in some regions, complicating management based on race-specific resistance.

=== Other causal agents ===
A number of additional soil-borne fungi cause stem and stalk rots on cereals, legumes and vegetables. Fusarium species, including Fusarium culmorum, cause stem and root rots on wheat and barley. Pythium species are common cause of damping off and root rot in seedlings, particularly under cool, wet conditions. Rhizoctonia solani causes stem and crown rots in a wide range of hosts including soybean and many vegetable crops. Sclerotium oryzae (sexual stage Magnaporthe salvinii) causes the principal stem rot of rice, which can cause yield losses of 30–70 per cent in heavily infected fields.

== Disease cycle ==
Most stem rot pathogens are persistent in soil through specialised resting structures, including sclerotia (Sclerotinia and Sclerotium), oospores (Phytophthora and Pythium), and chlamydospores (Fusarium), which can remain viable for several years between susceptible host crops. Spores or mycelium from these resting structures infect plants when environmental conditions are favourable, with most stem rot pathogens requiring high soil moisture for either germination or dispersal of infective propagules. Once the host is infected, the fungus or oomycete colonises stem tissue, and new resting structures form within or on the diseased tissue and return to the soil at the end of the growing season, completing the cycle.

== Management ==
Because the resting structures of stem rot pathogens are long-lived in soil, no single management tactic provides reliable control, and most extension programs recommend an integrated pest management (IPM) approach combining cultural, genetic, biological and chemical methods.

Cultural practices include crop rotation with non-host crops to reduce inoculum, adjusted row spacing and seeding rates to modify canopy microclimate, improved drainage on heavy soils, and the use of clean planting material and sterile equipment to limit pathogen spread. Crop residue from infected fields is a primary source of subsequent-season inoculum and is often managed by tillage, burning, or extended rotation.

Resistant cultivars are the most effective management tactic for Phytophthora root and stem rot, with race-specific resistance conferred by single dominant Rps genes and supplemented by quantitative (partial) resistance. Resistance to Sclerotinia sclerotiorum has remained partial across cultivars and is inconsistent under field conditions.

Fungicides are used for Sclerotinia stem rot during the host's flowering period, timed to coincide with apothecial development and ascospore release. Forecasting models, including the smartphone-based Sporecaster tool developed by the University of Wisconsin–Madison and validated in Wisconsin, Iowa, Michigan and Nebraska, are used to time fungicide applications based on apothecial development risk. Biological control with antagonistic fungi such as Coniothyrium minitans, which parasitises sclerotia, is also used in some systems.

== Economic impact ==
Stem rot diseases collectively cause substantial annual yield losses in major broadacre crops. Sclerotinia stem rot in soybean produces yield reductions of roughly 5 to 10 bushels per acre at 10 per cent disease incidence, and in epidemic years can cause losses on the order of one million metric tons across the United States. Stem rot of rice has been recorded as one of the major constraints on rice production in parts of South and Southeast Asia, with reported losses of up to 60–70 per cent in heavily infected fields. Phytophthora root and stem rot is a leading cause of stand establishment failure in the northern United States soybean production region.

== Causal species and hosts ==
The following table lists species reported to cause stem or stalk rot, with their principal hosts:

Species	Hosts
Cladosporium ear rot	maize/corn
Fusarium culmorum	wheat, barley
Glomerella graminicola	maize, sorghum, ryegrass, bluegrass, barley, wheat
Gibberella zeae	maize
Phialophora gregata, Cadophora gregata, Brown stem rot (BSR)	soybeans
Phyllachora maydis	maize
Phytophthora capsici	cucumbers
Phytophthora sojae	soybean
Phytophthora tentaculata	Chrysanthemum, Verbena, Delphinium ajacis
Pythium graminicola	bent grass, turmeric, cotton, barley, wheat, rice, beans, peas, sugarcane
Rhizoctonia
Sclerotium oryzae	rice
Sclerotinia sclerotiorum (White mold)	beans, can befall more than 350 species
Stenocarpella maydis	corn, canes
Waitea circinata	maize

Causative chemical agents produced by these fungal species may include mycotoxins: Trichothecene. Nematodes may cause symptoms similar to stem or stalk rots.

== See also ==
- Damping off
- Lodging (agriculture)
- Plant pathology
- Soybean diseases
