= Choanephora infundibulifera =

Scientific classification
- Kingdom: Fungi
- Division: Mucoromycota
- Class: Mucoromycetes
- Order: Mucorales
- Family: Choanephoraceae
- Genus: Choanephora
- Species: C. infundibulifera

Binomial name
- Choanephora infundibulifera (Curr.) Sacc. (1891)

Synonyms
- Choanephora cunninghamiana Curr. (1873); Cunninghamia infundibulifera Curr. (1873); Choanephora infundibulifera f. infundibulifera (Curr.) D.D.Cunn. (1891); Choanephora conjuncta Couch (1925)

Species of fungus

Choanephora infundibulifera is a species of fungus in the family Choanephoraceae. It is a plant pathogen.

== See also ==
- List of soybean diseases
