= List of soybean diseases =

Soybean plants (Glycine max) are subject to a variety of diseases and pests.

== Bacterial diseases ==
Bacterial diseases
Bacterial blight	Pseudomonas amygdali pv. glycinea
Bacterial pustules	Xanthomonas axonopodis pv. glycines = Xanthomonas campestris pv. glycines = Xanthomonas citri pv. glycines
Bacterial tan spot	Curtobacterium flaccumfaciens pv. flaccumfaciens = Corynebacterium flaccumfaciens pv. flaccumfaciens
Bacterial wilt	Curtobacterium flaccumfaciens pv. flaccumfaciens Ralstonia solanacearum = Pseudomonas solanacearum
Wildfire	Pseudomonas syringae pv. tabaci

== Fungal diseases ==
Fungal diseases
Alternaria leaf spot	Alternaria spp.
Anthracnose	Colletotrichum truncatum Colletotrichum dematium f. truncatum Glomerella glycines Colletotrichum destructivum [anamorph]
Black leaf blight	Arkoola nigra
Black root rot	Thielaviopsis basicola Chalara elegans [synanamorph]
Brown spot	Septoria glycines Mycosphaerella usoenskajae [teleomorph]
Brown stem rot	Phialophora gregata = Cephalosporium gregatum
Charcoal rot	Macrophomina phaseolina
Choanephora leaf blight	Choanephora infundibulifera Choanephora trispora
Damping-off	Rhizoctonia solani Thanatephorus cucumeris [teleomorph] Pythium aphanidermatum Pythium debaryanum Pythium irregulare Pythium myriotylum Pythium ultimum
Downy mildew	Peronospora manshurica
Drechslera blight	Drechslera glycines
Frogeye leaf spot	Cercospora sojina
Fusarium root rot	Fusarium spp.
Leptosphaerulina leaf spot	Leptosphaerulina trifolii
Mycoleptodiscus root rot	Mycoleptodiscus terrestris
Neocosmospora stem rot	Neocosmospora vasinfecta Acremonium spp. [anamorph]
Phomopsis seed decay	Phomopsis spp.
Phytophthora root and stem rot	Phytophthora sojae
Phyllosticta leaf spot	Phyllosticta sojaecola
Phymatotrichum root rot = cotton root rot	Phymatotrichopsis omnivora = Phymatotrichum omnivorum
Pod and stem blight	Diaporthe phaseolorum Phomopsis sojae [anamorph]
Powdery mildew	Microsphaera diffusa
Purple seed stain	Cercospora kikuchii
Pyrenochaeta leaf spot	Pyrenochaeta glycines
Pythium rot	Pythium aphanidermatum Pythium debaryanum Pythium irregulare Pythium myriotylum Pythium ultimum
Red crown rot	Cylindrocladium crotalariae Calonectria crotalariae [teleomorph]
Red leaf blotch = Dactuliophora leaf spot	Dactuliochaeta glycines = Pyrenochaeta glycines Dactuliophora glycines [synanamorph]
Rhizoctonia aerial blight	Rhizoctonia solani Thanatephorus cucumeris [teleomorph]
Rhizoctonia root and stem rot	Rhizoctonia solani
Rust	Phakopsora pachyrhizi
Scab	Spaceloma glycines
Sclerotinia stem rot	Sclerotinia sclerotiorum
Southern blight (damping-off and stem rot) = Sclerotium blight	Agroathelia rolfsii [teleomorph]
Stem canker	Diaporthe phaseolorum Diaporthe phaseolorum var. caulivora Phomopsis phaseoli [anamorph]
Stemphylium leaf blight	Stemphylium botryosum Pleospora tarda [teleomorph]
Sudden death syndrome	Fusarium solani f.sp. glycines
Target spot	Corynespora cassiicola
Yeast spot	Nematospora coryli

== Nematodes, parasitic ==
Nematodes, parasitic
Lance nematode	Hoplolaimus columbus Hoplolaimus galeatus Hoplolaimus magnistylus
Lesion nematode	Pratylenchus spp.
Pin nematode	Paratylenchus projectus Paratylenchus tenuicaudatus
Reniform nematode	Rotylenchulus reniformis
Ring nematode	Criconemella ornata
Root-knot nematode	Meloidogyne arenaria Meloidogyne hapla Meloidogyne incognita Meloidogyne javanica
Sheath nematode	Hemicycliophora spp.
Soybean cyst nematode	Heterodera glycines
Spiral nematode	Helicotylenchus spp.
Sting nematode	Belonolainus gracilis Belonolaimus longicaudatus
Stubby root nematode	Paratrichodorus minor
Stunt nematode	Quinisulcius acutus Tylenchorhynchus spp.

== Viral diseases ==
Viral diseases
Alfalfa mosaic	genus Alfamovirus, Alfalfa mosaic virus (AMV)
Bean pod mottle	genus Comovirus, Bean pod mottle virus (BPMV)
Bean yellow mosaic	genus Potyvirus, Bean yellow mosaic virus (BYMV)
Brazilian bud blight	genus Ilarvirus, Tobacco streak virus (TSV)
Cowpea chlorotic mottle	genus Bromovirus, Cowpea chlorotic mottle virus (CCMV)
Mung bean yellow mosaic	genus Begomovirus, Mung bean yellow mosaic virus (MYMV)
Peanut mottle	genus Potyvirus, Peanut mottle virus (PeMoV)
Peanut stripe	genus Potyvirus, Peanut stripe virus (PStV)
Peanut stunt	genus Cucumovirus, Peanut stunt virus (PSV)
Soybean chlorotic mottle	genus Caulimovirus, Soybean chlorotic mottle virus (SbCMV)
Soybean crinkle leaf	genus Begomovirus, Soybean crinkle leaf virus (SCLV)
Soybean dwarf	genus Luteovirus, Soybean dwarf virus (SbDV)
Soybean mosaic	genus Potyvirus, Soybean mosaic virus (SMV)
Soybean severe stunt	genus Nepovirus, Soybean severe stunt virus (SSSV)
Tobacco ringspot = bud blight	genus Nepovirus, Tobacco ringspot virus (TRSV)

== See also ==
- Soybean management practices
