= List of verbena diseases =

This article is a list of diseases of verbena (Verbena × hybrida).

== Fungal diseases ==
Alternaria leaf spot	Alternaria sp.
Black root rot	Thielaviopsis basicola Chalara elegans [synanamorph]
Botrytis blight	Botrytis cinerea
Cercospora leaf spot	Cercospora sp.
Mycosphaerella leaf spot	Mycosphaerella verbenae
Powdery mildew	Podosphaera xanthii complex Phyllactinia taurica complex Golovinomyces verbenae Erysiphe verbenicola
Rhizoctonia root and crown rot	Rhizoctonia solani

== Viral diseases ==
Bidens mottle	genus Potyvirus, Bidens mottle virus (BiMoV)
Impatiens necrotic spot	genus Tospovirus, Impatiens necrotic spot virus (INSV)
Bean yellow mosaic	genus Potyvirus, Bean yellow mosaic virus (BYMV)
Tomato spotted wilt	genus Tospovirus, Tomato spotted wilt virus (TSWV)
Verbena latent	genus Carlavirus, Verbena latent virus (VeLV)
Clover yellow mosaic	genus Potexvirus, Clover yellow mosaic virus (ClYMV)
