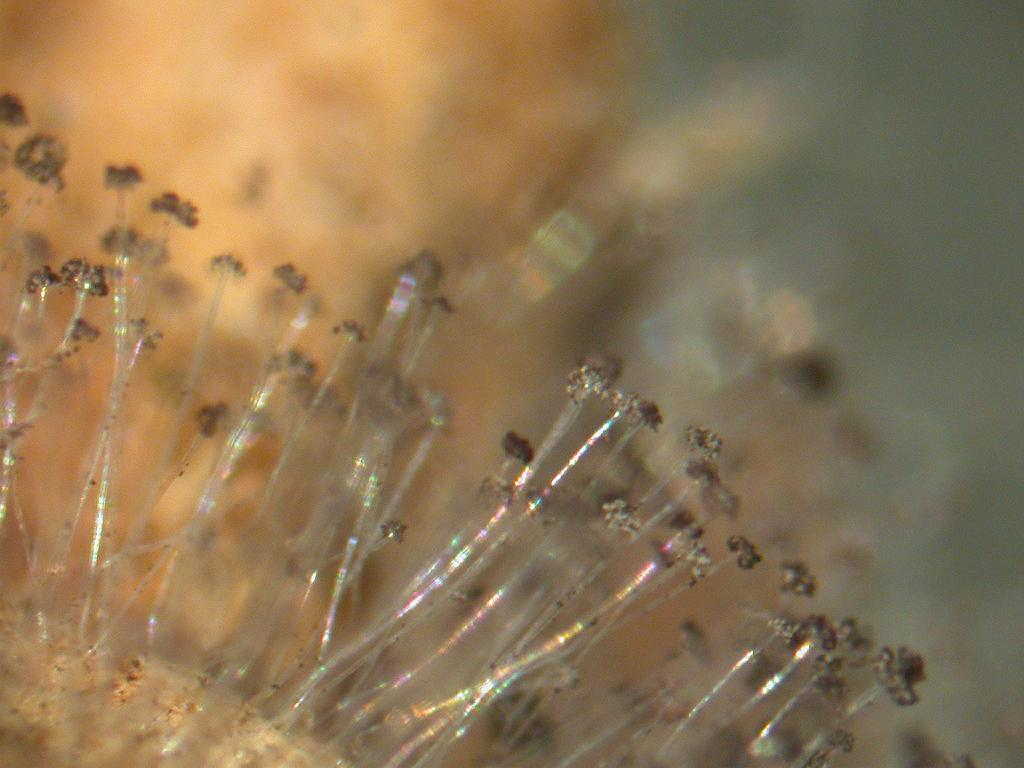
- Choanephora cucurbitarum (Choanephoraceae, Mucorales) on Pumpkin flower

Scientific classification
- Kingdom: Fungi
- Division: Mucoromycota
- Class: Mucoromycetes
- Order: Mucorales
- Family: Choanephoraceae
- Genus: Choanephora
- Species: C. cucurbitarum

Binomial name
- Choanephora cucurbitarum (Berk. & Ravenel) Thaxt., (1903)

Synonyms
- Choanephora americana A. Møller, (1901); Choanephora heterospora B.S. Mehrotra & M.D. Mehrotra, (1962) [1961] Choanephora infundibulifera f. cucurbitarum (Berk. & Ravenel) Schipper; Choanephora mandshurica (Saito & H. Nagan.) F.L. Tai, (1934); Choanephora simsonii D.D. Cunn. [as 'simsoni'], (1895); Choanephorella cucurbitarum (Berk. & Ravenel) Vuill., (1904); Cunninghamella mandshurica Saito & H. Nagan., (1915); Mucor cucurbitarum Berk. & Ravenel, (1875); Mucor curtus Berk. & M.A. Curtis, (1875); Rhopalomyces cucurbitarum Berk. & Ravenel, (1875); Rhopalomyces elegans var. cucurbitarum (Berk. & Ravenel) Marchal, (1893)

= Choanephora cucurbitarum =

Species of fungus

Choanephora cucurbitarum is a fungal plant pathogen that causes fruit and blossom rot of various cucurbits. It can also affect okra, snap bean, and southern pea, and may cause a stem and leaf rot of Withania somnifera. Recently Das et al. 2017 added few more patho-index on aubergine (Solanum melongena L.), teasle gourd (Momordica subangulata Blume subsp. renigera (G. Don) de Wilde, hyacinth bean (Lablab purpureus (L.) Sweet), green pea (Pisum sativum) from India. Wet weather, high temperature and high humidity favor disease development from inoculum that is typically soil-borne. Signs of infection on fruits or leaves include water-soaked, necrotic lesions, which progress rapidly under ideal conditions. As the fungus begins to produce spores, affected tissues become dark grey-brown and hairy as a result of the superficial sporangia.

== Description ==
Sporangiophores bearing sporangiola are erect, hyaline, unbranched, and apically dilated to form a clavate vesicle, from which arise dichotomously branched, distally clavate secondary vesicles. The sporangioles are indehiscent, ellipsoid, brown to dark brown with distinct longitudinal striations and measure 12-20 μm x 6-12 μm. Sporangia are multispored, spherical, initially white to yellow, pale brown to dark brown at maturity and measure 40-160 μm. Sporangiospores from sporangia are ellipsoid to broadly ellipsoid, brown to dark brown, indistinctly striate with fine hyaline polar appendages, and measure 16-20 μm x 8-12 μm (Saroj et al. 2012).

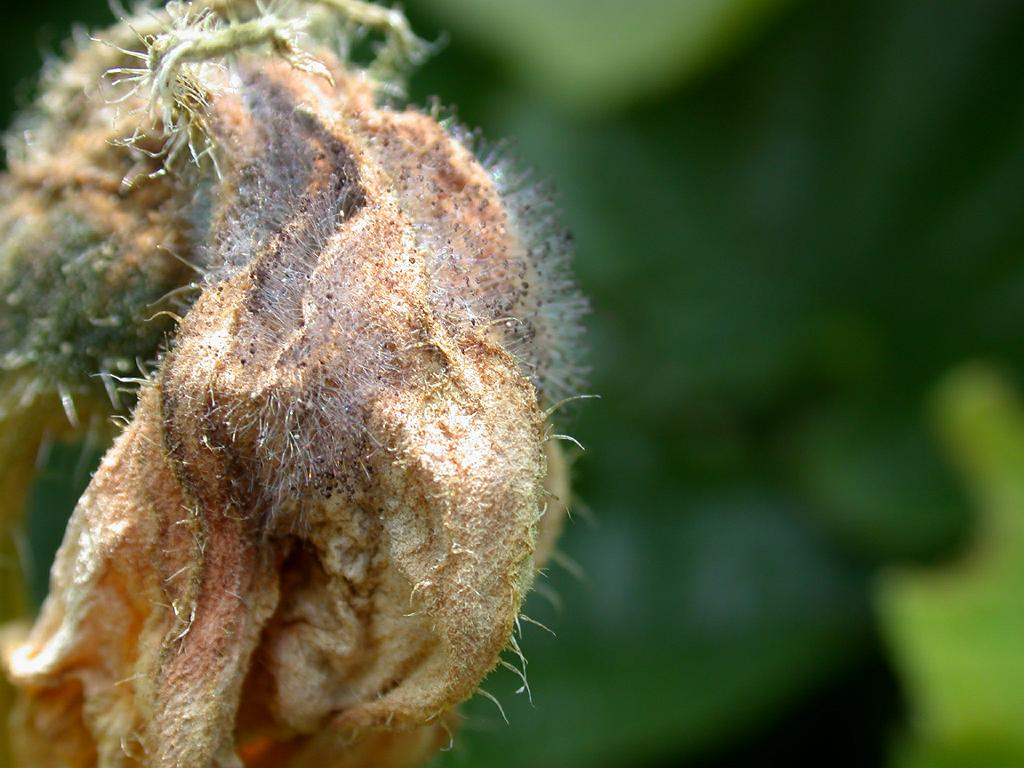
Choanephora cucurbitarum (Choanephoraceae Mucorales) on Pumpkin flower Japanese name;Kougaikekabi

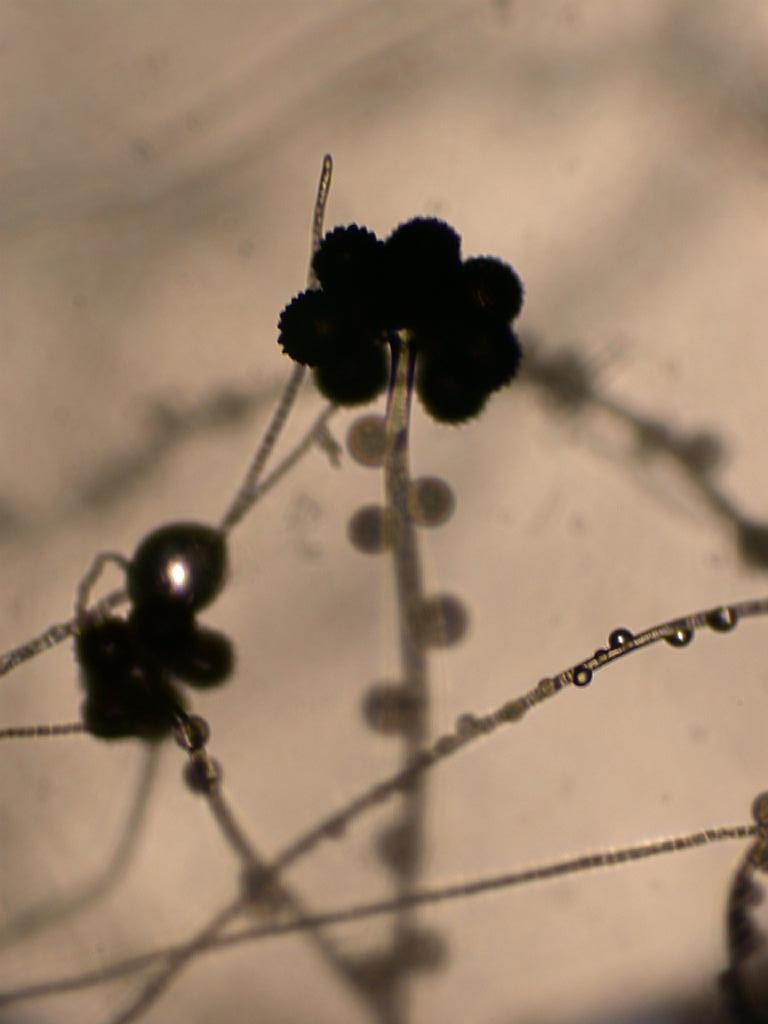
Choanephora cucurbitarum (Choanephoraceae Mucorales) incubated in wet chamber Japanese name;Kougaikekabi

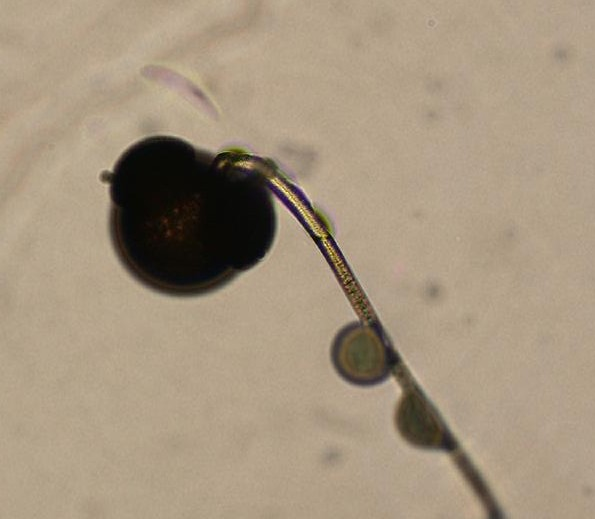
Choanephora cucurbitarum (Choanephoraceae Mucorales) incubated in wet chamber Japanese name;Kougaikekabi
