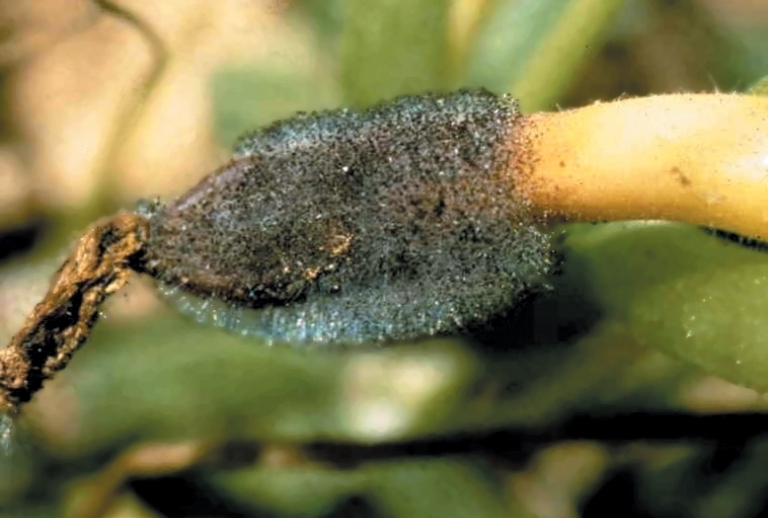
- Choanephora fruit rot caused by Choanephora cucurbitarum

Scientific classification
- Kingdom: Fungi
- Division: Mucoromycota
- Class: Mucoromycetes
- Order: Mucorales
- Family: Choanephoraceae
- Genus: Choanephora; Curr.

Species
- Choanephora americana; Choanephora circinans; Choanephora conjuncta; Choanephora cucurbitarum; Choanephora cunninghamiana; Choanephora dichotoma; Choanephora heterospora; Choanephora infundibulifera; Choanephora mandshurica; Choanephora monospora; Choanephora persicaria; Choanephora simsonii; Choanephora tandonii; Choanephora trispora

Synonyms
- Cunninghamia Curr. 1873 (not Cunninghamia R. Br. 1826(Cycadaceae))

= Choanephora =

Genus of fungi

Choanephora is a genus of Zygomycota fungi. Choanephora species are known as plant pathogens.
