= Monosporascus =

Scientific classification
- Domain: Eukaryota
- Kingdom: Fungi
- Division: Ascomycota
- Class: Sordariomycetes
- Order: Xylariales
- Family: Diatrypaceae
- Genus: Monosporascus; Pollack & Uecker (1974)

Type species
- Monosporascus cannonballus Pollack & Uecker (1974)

Genus of fungi

Monosporascus is a genus of fungi in the family Diatrypaceae. It has nine species. The type species, Monosporascus cannonballus, is a widespread plant pathogen that causes vine decline of melon and watermelon crops.

== Species ==
- Monosporascus brasiliensis A.Negreiros, M.León, J.Armengol & R.Sales Junior (2019)
- Monosporascus caatingaensis A.Negreiros, M.León, J.Armengol & R.Sales Junior (2019)
- Monosporascus cannonballus Pollack & Uecker (1974)
- Monosporascus eutypoides (Petr.) Arx (1976)
- Monosporascus ibericus Collado, Ant. González, Stchigel, Guarro & Peláez (2002)
- Monosporascus monosporus (Malloch & Cain) D.Hawksw. & Ciccar. (1979)
- Monosporascus mossoroensis A.Negreiros, M.León, J.Armengol & R.Sales Junior (2019)
- Monosporascus nordestinus A.Negreiros, M.León, J.Armengol & R.Sales Junior (2019)
- Monosporascus semiaridus A.Negreiros, M.León, J.Armengol & R.Sales Junior (2019)
