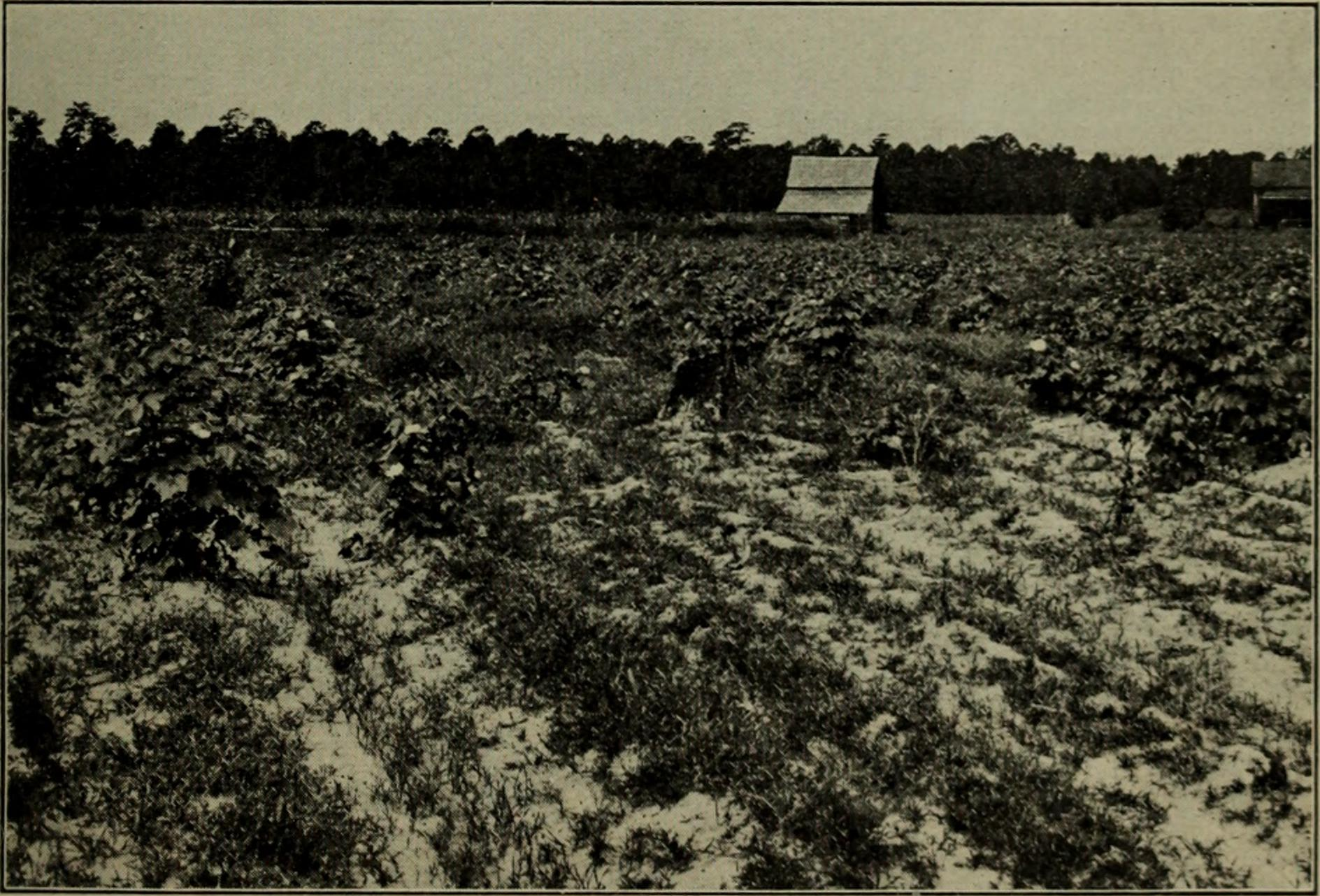
- Effects of Neocosmospora vasinfecta on a cotton field

Scientific classification
- Domain: Eukaryota
- Kingdom: Fungi
- Division: Ascomycota
- Class: Sordariomycetes
- Order: Hypocreales
- Family: Nectriaceae
- Genus: Neocosmospora
- Species: N. vasinfecta

Binomial name
- Neocosmospora vasinfecta E.F. Sm., (1899)

Synonyms
- Neocosmospora ornamentata M.A.F. Barbosa, (1965)

= Neocosmospora vasinfecta =

Species of fungus

Neocosmospora vasinfecta is a fungal plant pathogen that causes, among other types of infections, soybean stem rot.

== Varieties ==
- Neocosmospora vasinfecta f. africana
- Neocosmospora vasinfecta f. vasinfecta
- Neocosmospora vasinfecta var. africana
- Neocosmospora vasinfecta var. major
- Neocosmospora vasinfecta var. pisi
- Neocosmospora vasinfecta var. tracheiphila
- Neocosmospora vasinfecta var. vasinfecta

== See also ==
- List of soybean diseases
