= Soybean management practices =

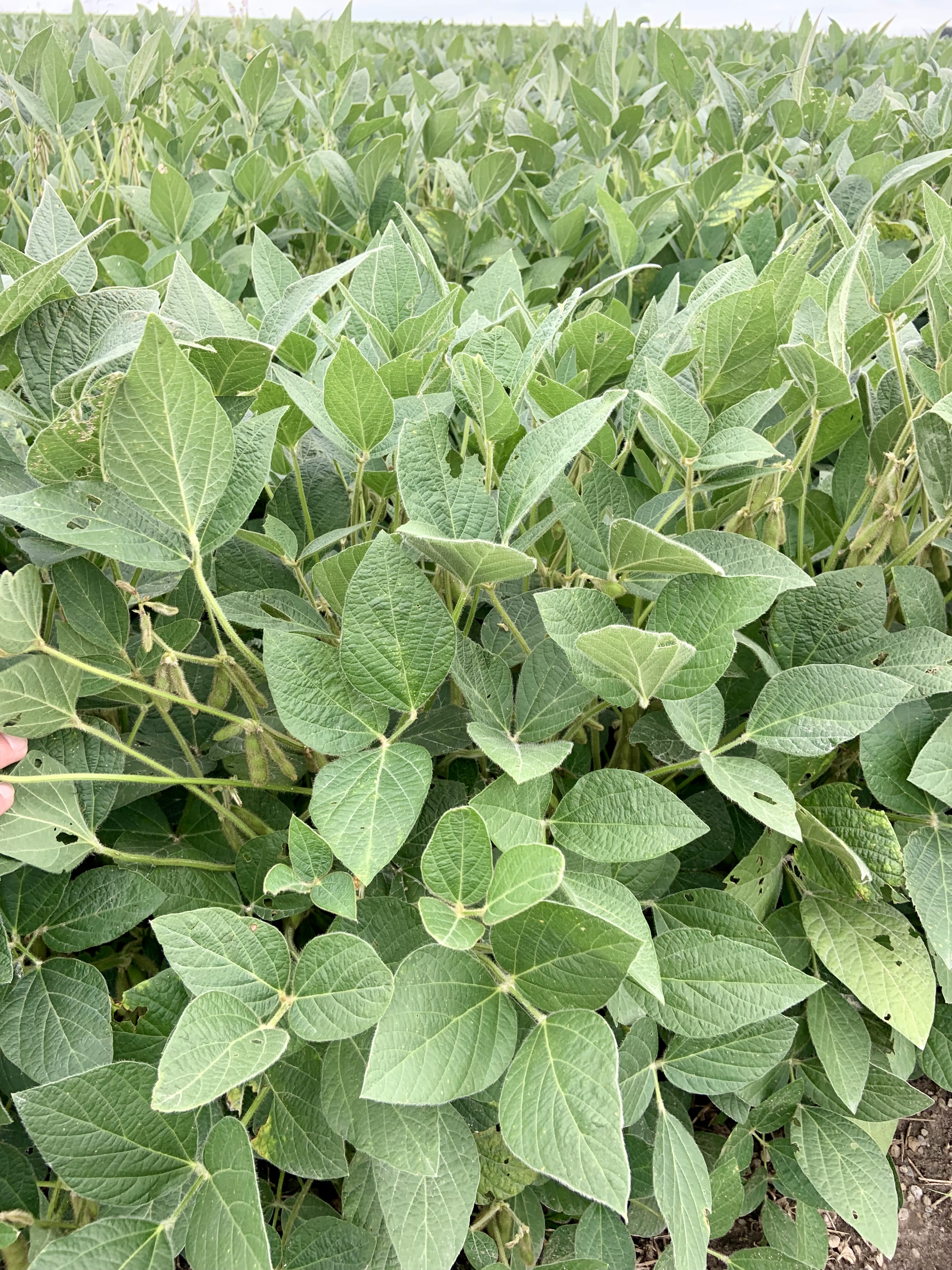
Soy beans crops in Minnesota

Soybean management practices in farming are the decisions a producer must make in order to raise a soybean crop. The type of tillage, plant population, row spacing, and planting date are four major management decisions that soybean farmers must consider. How individual producers choose to handle each management application depends on their own farming circumstances.

== Tillage ==
Tillage is defined in farming as the disturbance of soil in preparation for a crop. Tillage is usually done to warm the seed bed up, to help dry the seed bed out, to break up disease, and to reduce early weed pressure. Tillage prior to planting adds cost per acre farmed and has not been shown to increase soybean yields significantly.

“No till” is the practice of planting seed directly into the ground without disturbing the soil prior to planting. This practice eliminates the tillage pass, saving the farmer the associated costs. Planting no-till places seed directly into a cooler and wetter seed bed, which can slow germination. This process is considered a good conservation practice because tilling disturbs the soil crust, causing erosion. The practice of no-till is currently on the rise among farmers in the midwestern United States.

== Plant population ==
Plant population is the number of seeds planted in a given area. Population is usually expressed as plants or seeds per acre. Plant population is one of two major factors that determine canopy closure (when the plants cover the space in between the rows) and other yield components. A higher seed population will close the canopy faster and reduce soil moisture loss. A high plant population does not necessarily equal a high yield. The recommended seeding rate is 125,000 to 140,000 seeds per acre. The goal is to achieve a final stand of 100,000 plants per acre. Planting the extra seed gives the producer added insurance that each acre will attain a final stand of 100,000 plants.

== Row spacing ==
Row spacing is the second factor that determines canopy closure and yield components. Row spacing can either refer to the space between plants in the same row or the distance between two rows. Row spacing determines the degree of plant to plant competition. Rows planted closer together in a population will decrease the space between plants. Closer row widths increase plant to plant competition for nutrients and water but also increase sunlight use efficiency. According to former Iowa State University Soybean Extension Specialist Palle Pedersen, current recommendations are to plant rows that are less than 30" apart. This increases light interception and decreases weed competition.

== Planting date ==
Planting date refers to the date that the seed is sown. This concept is of prime importance in growing soybeans because yields are strongly correlated with planting date. Data from Iowa State University shows that earlier planted soybeans tend to have higher yields than soybeans planted later in the growing season. Producers seeding early need to check that the seedbed is in the right conditions (temperature, moisture, nutrients) since planting into a sub-optimal seedbed will lose yield instead of gaining it. Other special considerations include soil pathogens, insect pressure, and the possibility of frost. Fungicide treatment and insecticide treatment are options used to help reduce the risk of soil pathogens and insect pressure. Knowing the chance of frost in a given area prior to planting helps determine how early seed can safely be sown.

== See also ==
- Agronomy
- Agricultural soil science
- Agricultural science
- Agricultural productivity
- List of soybean diseases
