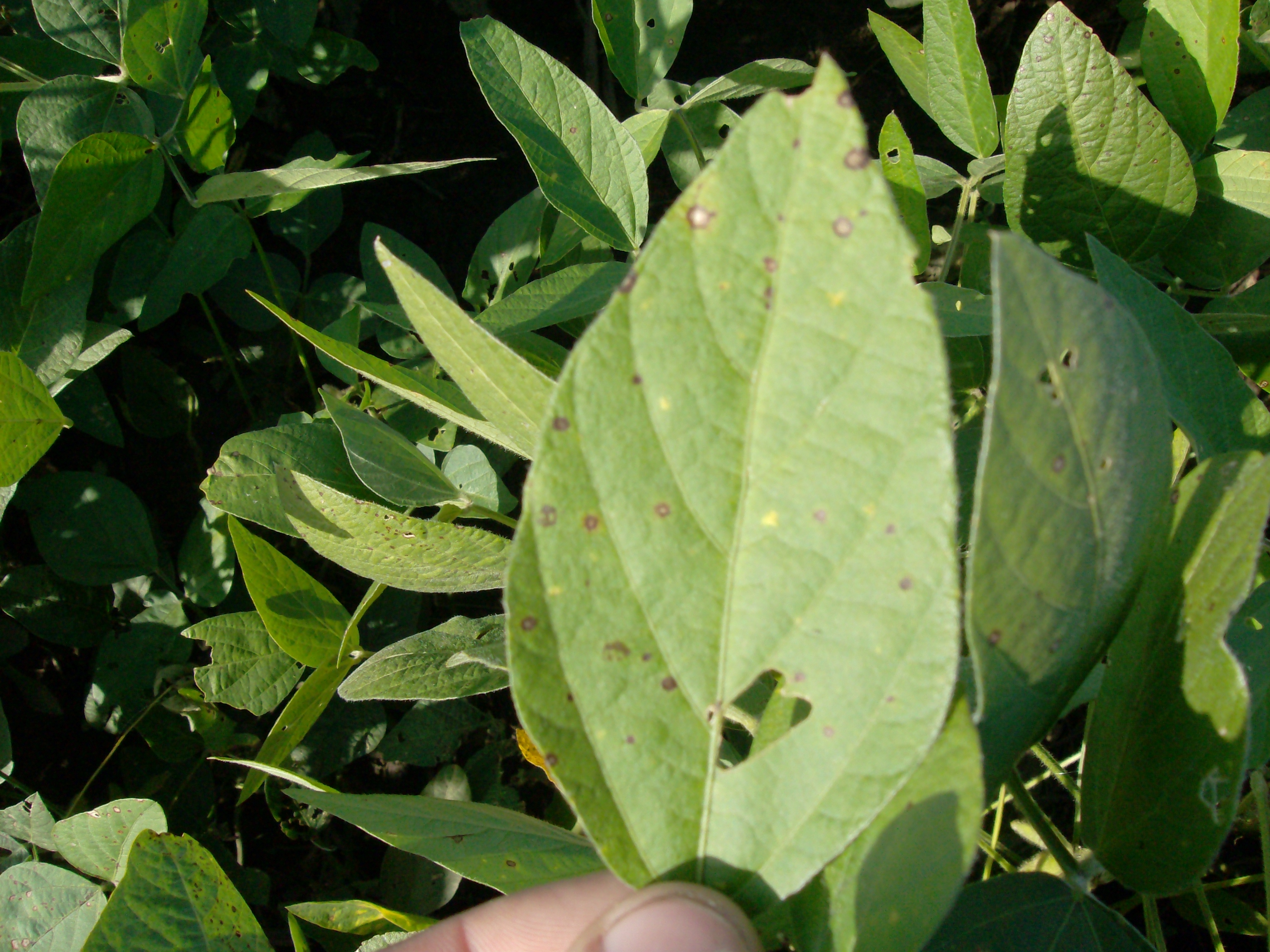
- Lesions created by Cercospora sojina

Scientific classification
- Kingdom: Fungi
- Division: Ascomycota
- Class: Dothideomycetes
- Order: Capnodiales
- Family: Mycosphaerellaceae
- Genus: Cercospora
- Species: C. sojina

Binomial name
- Cercospora sojina K.Hara

= Cercospora sojina =

Species of fungus

Cercospora sojina is a fungal plant pathogen which causes frogeye leaf spot of soybeans. Frog eye leaf spot is a major disease on soybeans in the southern U.S. and has recently started to expand into the northern U.S. where soybeans are grown. The disease is also found in other soybean production areas of the world.

== Host and symptomalogy ==
The soybean is the main host of this pathogen. When the pathogen occurs on soybeans, it causes small leaf lesions. These lesions, mostly found on upper leaf surfaces, are irregularly circular and consist of red-brown to purple colored borders. The inside of the lesion is often a gray to tan color. When the lesions mature, they are paper thin and the infected leaves appear tattered and weathered. The disease can lead to premature defoliation. The Frogeye leaf spot can also form on the pods and stems of highly susceptible cultivars. Oval and circular lesions that form on the pods and stems have dark-colored margins and light gray to reddish-brown color on the inside. If the pod becomes infected, the seeds can also become infected but may be symptomless. If they do show symptoms, gray blotches form on the seed and a cracked seed coat often occurs.

The plant is most susceptible to an infection when the leaves are young and expanding or if the leaves are old and senescing. With this range of susceptibility, the disease can occur several times throughout the plant canopy if the environment is ideal for the pathogen at each leaf layer emergence. This leads to a layered section of disease on one plant. Within a field, the disease often occurs in patches either small or large throughout the field. During Stages R1-R6 in soybeans and after a period of frequent rainfall is the best time to scout on frogeye leaf spot. This disease is typically present mid to late season.

== Disease cycle ==
Cercospora sojina, the causal fungal agent, and Frogeye Leaf Spot, the resulting disease, have a polycyclic infection cycle. Within this cycle, the pathogen can infect multiple plants during the growing season. In the winter, the pathogen is present as mycelium in crop residue and in leftover soybeans from the previous harvest. According to Bradley et al., the fungus can remain in plant residue for a minimum of two years (2016).

Conidia is the primary and secondary inoculum of the plant. This asexual structure is produced from conidiophores on infected plant residue (Lin and Kelly, 2018). The conidia can also be moved over short distances by wind currents (Mian et al., 2008). The most suitable conditions for infection are warm and wet weather between 25 and 30 °C with greater than 90% humidity (2018).

Infection can occur at any stage of the soybean growth cycle but occurs most frequently after flowering (Bayer, 2018). The fungus has more of a damaging impact when infection occurs before or at flowering (Lin and Kelly, 2018). Fungal infection occurs with direct contact from an already infected soybean pod but the fungus can also spread from seed to seed during plant growth. If infection does occur, external plant damage can be seen one to two weeks after contact with the pathogen.

In addition to seed infection, dark narrow lesions on stems and long to circular red-brown lesions on pods can also appear later in the growing season (Bayer, 2018). Soybean debris during the growing season contributes to the second inoculum of the disease. Managing the pathogen is most successful when the disease is recognized close to flowering time and before growth stage R5 or at the beginning of seed development.

== Pathogenesis ==
Cercospora sojina is a fungal pathogen that varies in colony color, growth rate, and spore formation in culture. The main infection structure of the pathogen is the conidia which is produced from light or dark conidiophores and rests on the tip of the structure. The conidia appear translucent and form cylindrical to round tapering shapes. The size varies between 6 micrometers to 40-70 micrometers and depends on how much area is available for growth (Lin and Kelly, 2018). The direct pathogenesis of the fungus is unknown but through genetic analysis a plausible suggestion is made. Certain gene clusters in the fungus genome encode for secondary metabolites, such as mycotoxins and pigments, and virulence effectors. The production of these metabolites is elevated during early infection and most likely play a key role in the fungus and plant interaction (Luo et al., 2017).

More specifically, when comparing nonresistant and resistance strains of the pathogen from China, researchers observed 5 candidate genes that are linked to virulence. The gene's function was related to metabolic mechanisms and the production of metabolites that can cause reduction in host resistant soybean plants (Gu et al., 2020). Cercosporin is one non-specific colored mycotoxin produced in some Cercospora species. It is suggested to play an important role in the virulence of the pathogen. This mycotoxin is a photosensitizer and can cause oxidative damage to cell structures. Genes that encode for this toxin have been found in some genomes of the fungus but no cercosporin has been found in cultured mycelium or infected plant tissue (Luo et al., 2018; Lin and Kelly, 2018).

== Environment ==
Frogeye leaf spot is often found after warm, humid weather conditions. Frequent rainfalls over an extended period of time can also promote the disease to form. The fungus is known to overwinter in infested seeds and crop residue. If a producer has a field with continuous production of soybeans, there is a higher chance of frogeye leaf spot typically present.

Generally, lesions take more than one week to develop after the plant has been infected. This causes the disease to not be visible on the younger leaves of the plant until significantly later. Older leaves are not as susceptible to the disease. In severe conditions lesions can be seen on pods and stems too.

== Management ==
Without proper management there can be various consequences of this disease. Yield loss is a huge impact of this pathogen. If a large amount of lesions are present on the leaves of a soybean there is a loss of leaf area index which in turn results in less photosynthesis. With less photosynthesis, less carbohydrate will be made and the plant will produce less seed. There is also ethylene produced within the leaf spots that stimulates defoliation in the leaves. This will further reduce productivity of the plant.

In order to stop yield loss it is important that various methods are used to manage this disease. These include resistance, seed quality, cultural practices and fungicide use. Resistant cultivars exist and can be planted if a producer knows this disease has been a consistent problem. Instead of saving seed, a producer should plant certified disease free seed to reduce the risk of bringing the pathogen into the field. Seed Quality is important and can prevent the survival stage of the disease cycle.

Rotation with crops not susceptible to the disease, like corn and small grains, can be a form of cultural control of frogeye leaf spot. This will take away the host in the following season so the survival structure will not have a place to go. Using tillage to disturb the pathogen's survival structures will also reduce the disease in the future.

Fungicides can be applied to the foliar from the R1-R4 stage of soybeans (late flowering to pod-filling stages). This kind of application can reduce the incidence and severity of the disease. Yield and seed quality can also be improved. In the United States, Frogeye leaf spot has been reported to have resistance to Quinone outside inhibitors (strobilurins). Using multiple active ingredients for a fungicide application can help prevent resistance. Seed treatments are a preventative method that can reduce the threat frogeye leaf spot.

None of these methods have been proven to be better than others but by using multiple of these management tools a grower will help reduce the amount of inoculum available in the field and assist in protecting the plants from infection.

== Significance ==
The pathogen is a serious concern to soybean farmers and can cause detrimental yield loss during the growing season. Since 2000, the fungus has been present in the northern and southern U.S. states as well as 27 other countries spanning North and South America, Europe Africa and Asia (Lin and Kelly 2018). The fungus is very prevalent in the southern U.S., but in previous years it has spread to northern soybean fields (Smith, 2020). During a wet season, the fungus can cause up to a 30% loss of soybean crop in some fields (Bayer, 2018). Other authors note a yield loss as high as 60% due to the reduction in photosynthetic area, early leaf loss and reduced seed quality (Lin and Kelly, 2018).

Crop reduction from the pathogen can differ each year depending on the environmental conditions. Between 2010 and 2014, bushel loss varied between 3,727 and 18,147 (bushels in thousands) in the United States. Another source states that in Midwestern states between 1996 and 2000, the estimated loss was 460,000 bushels and between 2013 and 2017 the estimated loss was reported as 7,600,000 bushels in the same areas (Stoetzer, 2019).

Attempts to reduce the presence of the fungus have been employed, however, Cercospora sojina still remains a threat to farmers. Resistance to fungicide has already occurred in 13 U.S. states at the end of 2016. New versions of the fungal genome have also been observed across the U.S., Brazil, China and other regions where soybeans are grown that have varying virulence and resistance levels (Lin and Kelly, 2018; Gu et al., 2020). Warmer winter temperatures have been suggested as a possible contributor to an increase in Frogeye Spot disease as well as susceptible soybeans and conservation tillage. If leftover residue from infected plants is not removed and crop rotation does not occur, the fungus will continue to develop into the next growing season.

== See also ==
- List of soybean diseases
