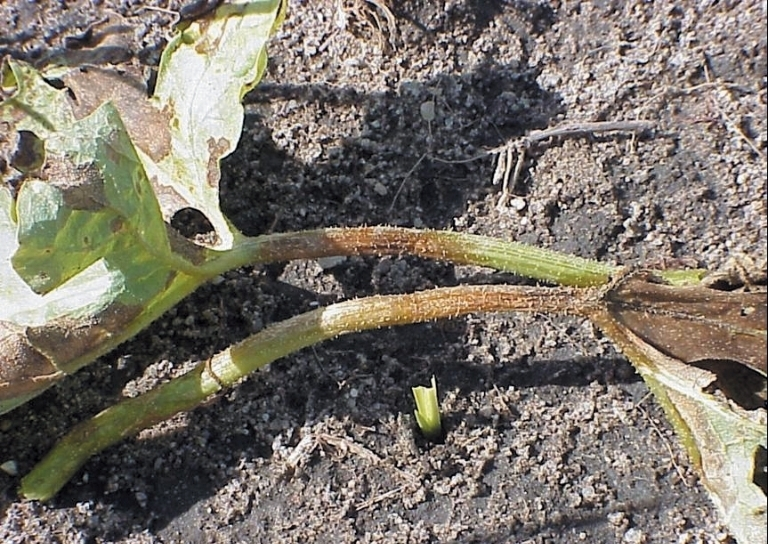
- Symptoms of D. bryoniae on watermelon

Scientific classification
- Kingdom: Fungi
- Division: Ascomycota
- Class: Dothideomycetes
- Order: Pleosporales
- Family: Didymellaceae
- Genus: Didymella
- Species: D. bryoniae

Binomial name
- Didymella bryoniae (Fuckel) Rehm, (1881)

Synonyms
- Ascochyta citrullina (Chester) C.O. Sm., (1905); Ascochyta cucumis Fautrey & Roum., (1891); Ascochyta melonis Potebnia, (1910); Cercospora cucurbitae Ellis & Everh., (1888); Didymella effusa (Niessl) Sacc., (1882); Didymella melonis Pass., (1891); Didymosphaeria bryoniae (Auersw.) Niessl, (1875); Didymosphaeria effusa Niessl; Didymosphaeria melonis Pidopl. Diplodina citrullina (Chester) Grossenb., (1909); Mycosphaerella citrullina (C.O. Sm.) Grossenb., (1909); Mycosphaerella cucumis (Fautrey & Roum.) W.F. Chiu & J.C. Walker, (1949); Mycosphaerella melonis (Pass.) W.F. Chiu & J.C. Walker, (1949); Phyllosticta citrullina Chester, (1891); Sphaerella bryoniae Auersw., 5: 15 (1869); Sphaerella citrullina (C.O. Sm.) Sacc. & Traverso, (1911); Sphaeria bryoniae Fuckel, (1870)

= Didymella bryoniae =

Species of fungus

Didymella bryoniae, syn. Mycosphaerella melonis, is an ascomycete fungal plant pathogen that causes gummy stem blight on the family Cucurbitaceae (the family of gourds and melons), which includes cantaloupe, cucumber, muskmelon and watermelon plants. The anamorph/asexual stage for this fungus is called Phoma cucurbitacearum. When this pathogen infects the fruit of cucurbits it is called black rot.

== Host symptoms ==
- Gray-green to black circular leaf spots
- Angular/target-like water-soaked lesions
- Stem lesions/cankers
- Vine lesions
- Vine Necrosis
- Reddish gummy ooze exuding from the lesions/wounds
- Wilt
- Defoliation

The first symptoms appear as grayish green, circular spots between the veins of the leaf lobes. With age these spots darken to brown and black. Lesions begin to develop on vines at the vine nodes and then elongate into water-soaked streaks, and these streaks are pale brown at first but turn gray with time. The petioles and stems eventually become necrotic and often shrivel. Eventually all infected vines will become necrotic and occasionally the plant dies due to wilting and defoliation. Another common sign following the stem lesions is a red to amber colored ooze. Some regions report the presence of small pseudothecia as black specks inside the cankers.

Gummy stem blight can be confused with anthracnose, which is caused by a fungal plant pathogen called Colletotrichum lagenarium. To distinguish between anthracnose and gummy stem blight, gummy stem blight leaf lesions are darker, target-like and less deteriorated than anthracnose lesions. Newly infected plants will begin to show symptoms within 7–12 days.

== Signs ==
- Black specks (Perithecia and Pycnidia) on cankers
- Round-ended, cylindrical, monoseptate and hyaline conidia
  - Conidia dimensions: 6.4–13.6 μm in length and 3.69–4.68 μm in diameter

In vitro, the fungal growth on an agar plate looks rough and undulated. When grown in vitro on agar, the fungus produces a white to olive-colored mycelium. In latter periods of growth, the mycelium is an olive to dark green or black color.

== Disease cycle ==
Didymella bryoniae survives on deceased vines, crop debris and on seeds in between seasons and D. bryoniae can survive for 5 months on the soil surface in winter. The fungus develops best under moist conditions, and cotyledons and young watermelon/melon leaves are especially susceptible to the fungus. D. bryoniae produces ascospores (meiotic spores) in perithecia and conidia (mitotic spores) in pycnidia and both of these spores are dispersed by rain/rain-splash and UV light is needed in order for the fungus to sporulate. Ideal ascospore dispersal occurs after nightly rainfall and dew periods. In order to infect, ascospores must land on leaves that have free-standing water on them. Next the ascospores penetrate through the leaf cuticle. Stems may be infected by D. bryoniae ascospores through stem wounds or by the extension of leaf lesions. Fruits are penetrated through wounds and pollination flower scars. Conidia are produced on the lesion sites of leaves and stems. Certain Cucurbita species are resistant to D. bryoniae but become vulnerable once they mature.

== Epidemiology ==
Didymella bryoniae is common in the Southern U.S. and other subtropical or tropical locations. Most infections occur during rainy/wet seasons, in which the humid is greater than 90% and the temperature is roughly 20–24 °C. Humidity seems to be a larger factor than temperature when it comes to infection success. D. bryoniae can also be found in temperate regions, especially where winter squash and pumpkins are grown. This pathogen is also common in greenhouses where cucumbers are grown.

D. bryoniae can be spread by the transfer of conidia through a variety of fashions. The most common forms of transfer for these conidia are through the air and water splashing. The fungus is capable of surviving in dead plant tissue giving it the ability to infect the following crop planting. The pathogen requires an entry site on the plant in order to infect so areas that also experience issues with pests are at higher risk.

In vitro, D. bryoniae does not form pycnidia without UV-light but if cultured in the presence of UV light and darkness, conidia/pycnidiospores produce mycelium rapidly.

== Management and detection ==
The standard management practice for D. bryoniae is to use pesticide treated/pathogen-free seeds and to rotate crops on a 2-year cycle to reduce inoculum prevalence. There are no commercially acceptable resistant cucumbers, melons or watermelons available yet on the market, but some plant breeders have identified D. bryoniae resistant genes, such as the gene db in watermelon. Regular benzimidazole fungicide applications can control this pathogen, but certain D. bryoniae isolates have been found to be resistant to benzimidazole fungicides in greenhouse settings and in the field.

Along with fungicides, it is important to have proper ventilation and irrigation practices in greenhouse settings. Proper irrigation and ventilation can be utilized to prevent water buildup on leaves. Also to prevent disease onset in greenhouse settings, use UV-absorbing vinyl film, to prevent fungal sporulation.

Currently cultural practices and fungicides work well in greenhouses and in the field only if D. bryoniae is diagnosed in the early stages of disease development. Molecular tools such as polymerase chain reaction (PCR), PCR-enzyme-linked immunosorbent assay and magnetic-capture hybridization multiplex real-time PCR are used to diagnose D. bryoniae in the early stages disease development, although these molecular tools may only be useful for specific isolates of D. bryoniae.

== Importance ==
The United States consumed 15.69 pounds of watermelon per capita in the year 2018 after a rise in both total imports and locally produced watermelons. Florida and Georgia characterized 35 isolates of Didymella and phoma spp. Associated with symptoms of gummy stem blight on watermelon. These two states produced 42% of the United States total watermelon value in 2013, and a combined 20,000 hectares in total farm area. Florida alone produced 907 million pounds of watermelon in 2019 meaning that this pathogen could have a direct effect on at least 25% of domestic watermelon crop in the United States.
