= Gilbertella persicaria =

Scientific classification
- Kingdom: Fungi
- Division: Mucoromycota
- Class: Mucoromycetes
- Order: Mucorales
- Family: Choanephoraceae
- Genus: Gilbertella
- Species: G. persicaria

Binomial name
- Gilbertella persicaria (E.D. Eddy) Hesselt., (1960)

Synonyms
- Choanephora persicaria E.D. Eddy, (1925); Choanephora persicaria var. indica (B.S. Mehrotra & M.D. Mehrotra) Milko, (1968); Gilbertella persicaria var. indica B.S. Mehrotra & M.D. Mehrotra, (1963)

Species of fungus

Gilbertella persicaria is a plant pathogen.
