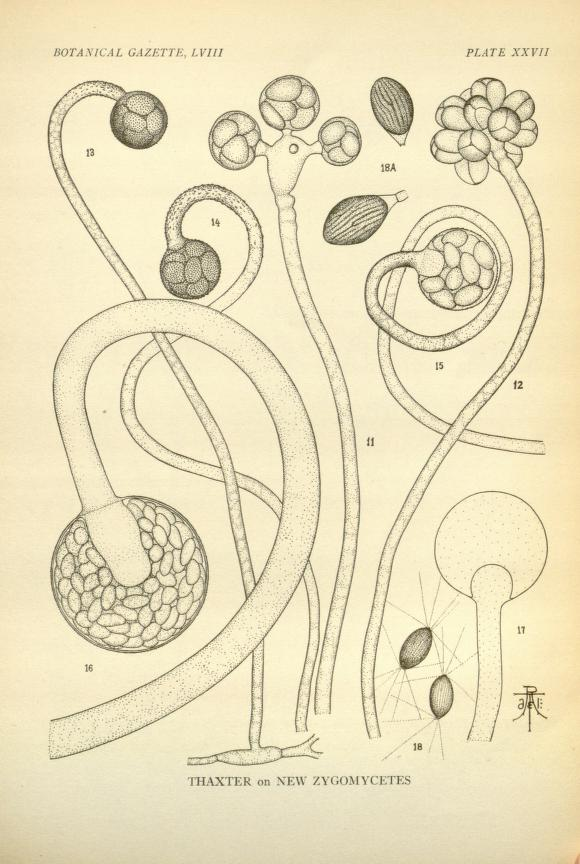

Scientific classification
- Domain: Eukaryota
- Kingdom: Fungi
- Division: Mucoromycota
- Class: Mucoromycetes
- Order: Mucorales
- Family: Choanephoraceae
- Genus: Blakeslea
- Species: B. trispora

Binomial name
- Blakeslea trispora Thaxter (1914)

Synonyms
- Choanephora trispora Sinha (1940)

= Blakeslea trispora =

Species of fungus

Blakeslea trispora is a mould and member of the division Zygomycota. This species has been well studied for its ability to produce carotenoids, particularly, β-carotene and lycopene. β-carotene is a vitamin A precursor and both of β-carotene and lycopene play a significant role in the inhibition of oxidative stress. Blakeslea trispora is commonly isolated from soil samples throughout the Southern United States and Southern Asia. B. trispora is a pathogen of tropical plants. In vivo pathogenicity testing using animal models suggests this fungus is not a cause of animal or human disease.

== History ==
The genus Blakeslea was named in honor of American botanist Albert Francis Blakeslee based on B. trispora. While A.F. Blakeslee was studying another fungus called Botrytis rileyi, he collaborated with Roland Thaxter to further study this fungus. In 1914, while Thaxter was doing further research on Botrytis rileyi, Blakeslea trispora was accidentally isolated from a contaminated caterpillar infected with Botrytis rileyi. Blakeslea trispora was first identified from the larvae of the caterpillar, which was growing on the cowpea plant. The caterpillar was infected by the fungus Botrytis rileyi; however, Blakeslea trispora was thought to be incidentally transferred to the diseased caterpillar feeding on a cowpea flower. When Thaxter first identified B. trispora, he considered B. trispora to be very closely related to the genus Choanephora because of highly similar sporangiospore morphology. Both have a distinctive brown colour with faint, longitudinal striations on the sporangiole wall. The shape of the large spherical heads of their sporangiola are also similar. However, Choanephora and Blakeslea are considered to be distinct genera and can be distinguishable by the spore wall and its separation from the sporangiole wall. Species of Choanephora have highly adherent sporangiole wall in contrast to Blakeslea species where the sporangiole wall is readily separable from the underlying spore at maturity.

== Growth and morphology ==
Blakeslea trispora undergoes both sexual and asexual reproduction. The asexual reproductive phase of Blakeslea trispora involves the production of sporangiospores produced in sporangia. Once released, they can germinate in the presence of free water. Colonies of B. trispora grow rapidly on the agar growth media at 25 °C. They are white at first but become yellow to pale brown and very dark brown as they mature. The hyphae of B. trispora are aseptate, very dense, and highly branched. Sexual reproduction is by the formation of zygospores, which contain high concentrations of triglycerol-rich lipids and phosphatidylcholine. Zygospores can persist for long periods of time, and their germination is dependent on a cytoplasmic regulatory system that sustains dormancy and forestalls germination in the presence of unfavorable growth conditions. Zygospores range in size from 40-80μm. They are spherical or slightly flattened in shape. Blakeslea trispora has a heterothallic mating system, having (+) and (-) mating types. Contact and interchange between the opposite mating types is a necessary precursor to induce sexual reproduction and development of zygospores. Extensions called gametangia are formed from each of the compatible haploid mycelia. Following anastomosis, a fertile heterokaryotic zygosporangium is formed within which the zygospores develop. During sexual reproduction, carotenoid pigments are produced by both of mating type. Carotenoids are precursors of many apocarotenoids that contain very important sex-specific precursors, trisporic acid (TSA) for the sexual reproduction of Blakeslea trispora. Carotenes produced from carotenoids are further processed by carotene oxygenase to synthesize trisporic acid (TSA). TSA produced from carotene stimulates both sexually complementary cells to make contact with each other. TSA is considered an important signalling molecule for the initiation and control sexual reproduction.

== Physiology ==
At the beginning of the sexual reproduction cycle of B. trispora, the initial step is the production of carotenes from carotenoids. Carotenes are further processed by carotene oxygenase, which is encoded in the tsp3 gene of the B. trispora, to produce TSA. TSA is produced by both of the mating types: (+) and (-) strains, and it is copiously produced especially when compatible mycelia are grown together. As these two different sex types produce TSA, they sense sexually complementary cells and form gametangia. Eventually, those gametangia merge and zygosporangia form. As these two different mating types meet each other, each mating type transfers the sex-specific precursor of the trisporoid TSA, and acts as a signal for the synthesis of the surface protein agglutinin. Agglutinin allows the two TSAs to recognize each other. It then causes rapid contact and efficient interactions between those two different mating types. Additionally, stimulating both of the mating types by TSA promotes synthesis of β-carotene. As β-carotene is produced, it becomes a precursor of trisporoid, which is a pheromone for B. trispora. Production of β-carotene promotes a positive feedback process that further stimulates carotenogenesis and the production of trisporoid which serves as a β-carotene increasing substance. Furthermore, it act as a hormone stimulator of its biosynthesis. Thus, Blakeslea trispora requires certain concentrations of TSA to activate carotenogenesis and produce more carotenoids (about 0.5% of its dry weight) which can be accumulated in the zygospores of B. trispora. Therefore, both TSA and trisporoid acts as sex hormones in Blakeslea trispora, which triggers the sexual reproduction and controls intimate contact between heterothallic strains, further governing the formation of sex structures, zygospores. Carotenoids are absolutely necessary not only for the production of trisporic acid, but also for the process of zygote formation, as significant factors for the production of sporopollenin, a structural component of the zygospore cell wall. It is consequential to regulate this feedback-type synthesis with carotenoids and further synthesis of TSA. Therefore, the formation of the zygospores can be prevented by the inhibition of carotenogenesis in Blakeslea trispora.

== Applications ==
Bifunctional lycopene cyclase/phytoene synthase

Identifiers
- Organism: Blakeslea trispora
- Symbol: carRA
- UniProt: Q67GH9
Search for
- Structures: Swiss-model
- Domains: InterPro

Blakeslea trispora is useful as sources of β-carotene and its precursor molecule, lycopene, in industrial production. These molecules are useful food coloring agents and may have beneficial effects for human health as antioxidants.

The production of lycopene primarily requires some interaction between the mating strains. Blakeslea trispora needs both mating types to synthesize lycopene on a commercially applicable scale. The (-) strain is twice proportionally as important as the (+) strain in determining the productivity of the synthesis of the lycopene. To produce an optimal amount of lycopene, excess (-) mating type at a 1:2 (+/-) ratio with inoculum ages 36 and 48 hours respectively is favorable.

=== Lycopene ===
Blakeslea trispora is known to be the most effective producer of lycopene. Lycopene is processed by lycopene cyclase which leads to the production of β-carotene. For industrial production of lycopene, Blakeslea trispora is grown with an lycopene cyclase inhibitor which can be introduced into the fermentation process. The zygospores of Blakeslea trispora tend to contain a maximum amount of lycopene. Lycopene is an intermediate in the biosynthesis of all dicyclic carotenoids including β-carotene.

Lycopene is one of the most important carotene molecules because it is capable of producing both β-carotene and other carotenoids, well known for their potent anti-oxidant activities. As such, β-carotene and other carotenoids play crucial roles for oxidative stress reduction and cardiovascular protection. Carotenoids have highly efficient antioxidant scavenging activities against ROS (reactive oxygen species), such as singlet-oxygen and free radicals. Therefore, they have the ability to prevent chronic diseases such as cancer, cerebrovascular and cardiovascular diseases and myocardial infarction. Lycopene is considered a very important and relevant source to human health. A case study by Weilian Hu and his colleagues in 2013 showed that the administration of lycopene in adult mice appeared to improve the activity of antioxidant enzyme. They have reported that, the administration of Blakeslea trispora powder, which contains high amounts of lycopene has the potential to protect the liver, brain, kidney and skin against oxidative stress. This is done by reducing the concentration of ROS and by enhancing the activities of the antioxidant enzyme. Furthermore, they are further investigating whether the fungus Blakeslea trispora could be a potent effector of anti-aging because of its ability to efficiently mass-produce amounts of lycopene.

=== β-carotene ===
β-carotene is a molecule which displays a red-orange pigment. Therefore, it is used as a coloring agent for food products. β-carotene is a member of carotenes which are highly unsaturated isoprene derivatives. Because Blakeslea trispora has an effective ability to produce great amount of β-carotene from lycopene, Blakeslea trispora is the main organism used for its production on an industrial scale.

β-carotenes are known to be a powerful stimulant of the human immune system and play significant roles in the prevention of degenerative diseases and cancers. All cells are capable of producing and regulating ROS. However, dysregulation of ROS can lead to DNA damaging, inactivation of enzymes and proteins, disruption of membranes. This ultimately causes cell death, becoming very toxic to the individuals. Further investigations of β-carotene usage collected from Blakeslea trispora may lead to great improvements to human health in the treatment and prevention of certain chronic diseases such as cancer.
