= List of fuchsia diseases =

This article is a list of diseases of fuchsias (Fuchsia × hybrida).

== Bacterial diseases ==
Bacterial diseases
Crown gall	Agrobacterium tumefaciens
Southern wilt	Ralstonia solanacearum = Pseudomonas solanacearum

== Fungal diseases ==
Fungal diseases
Armillaria root rot	Armillaria mellea
Black root rot	Thielaviopsis basicola Chalara elegans [synanamorph]
Botrytis blight	Botrytis cinerea
Cercospora leaf spot	Cercospora fuchsiae
Phytophthora root and stem rot	Phytophthora parasitica = Phytophthora nicotianae
Pythium root rot	Pythium rostratum Pythium ultimum
Rhizoctonia root and crown rot	Rhizoctonia solani
Rust	Pucciniastrum epilobii f.sp. palustris Pucciniastrum pustulatum
Septoria leaf spot	Septoria sp.
Verticillium wilt	Verticillium albo-atrum

== Viral and viroid diseases ==
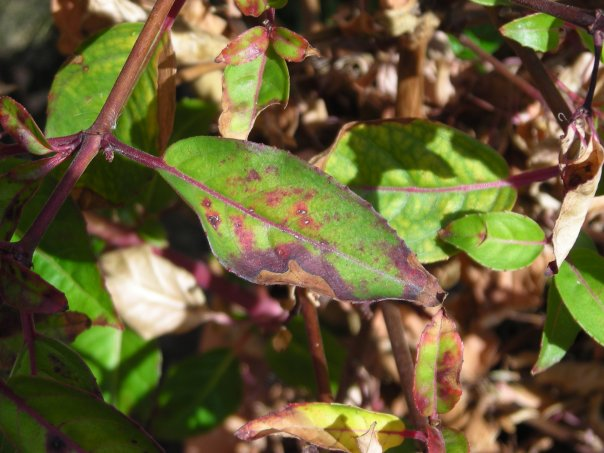
INSV on fuchsia

Viral and viroid diseases
Impatiens necrotic spot	Impatiens necrotic spot virus (INSV)
Spotted wilt	Tomato spotted wilt virus (TSWV)
