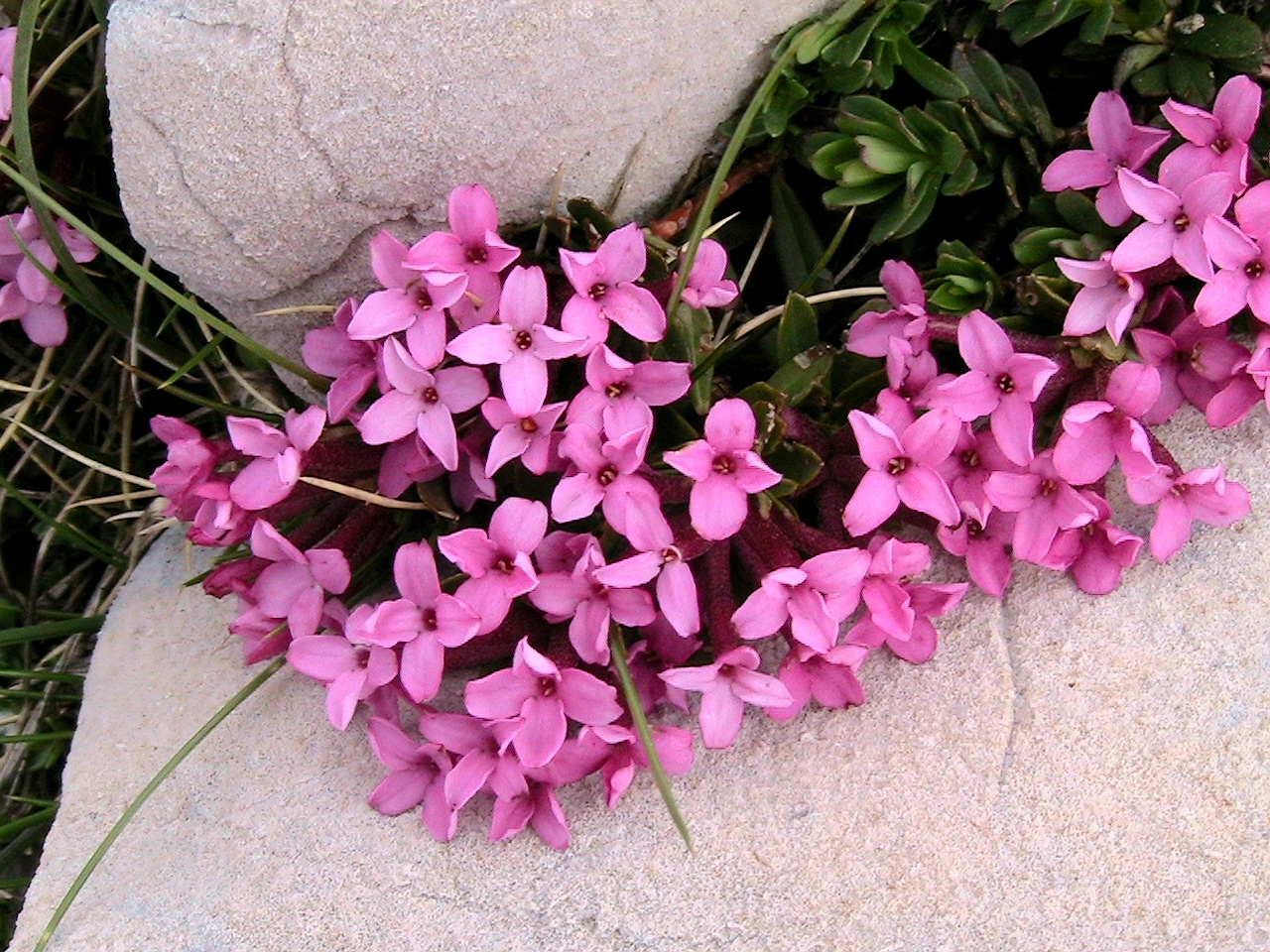
- In flower in the Catalan Pyrenees, at 2,300 m altitude

Scientific classification
- Kingdom: Plantae
- Clade: Tracheophytes
- Clade: Angiosperms
- Clade: Eudicots
- Clade: Rosids
- Order: Malvales
- Family: Thymelaeaceae
- Genus: Daphne
- Species: D. cneorum

Binomial name
- Daphne cneorum L.

Synonyms
- Daphne bellojocensis Gand.; Daphne delphini Lavallée; Daphne juliae Koso-Pol.; Daphne odorata Lam.; Daphne prostrata Salisb.; Daphne rhodanica Gand.; Daphne verlotii Gren. & Godr.; Laureola cneorum (L.) Samp.; Thymelaea cneorum (L.) Scop.; Thymelaea odorata Bubani

= Daphne cneorum =

Species of shrub

Daphne cneorum, the rose daphne or garland flower, is a species of flowering plant in the family Thymelaeaceae, native across the mountains of central and southern Europe from the Pyrenees east through the Alps, the Apennine, Carpathian and the Balkan Peninsula mountains, and locally in lowlands further north and east to Ukraine and westernmost Russia. It is a prostrate spreading evergreen shrub growing to 50 cm (20 in) high, with downy stems bearing oblanceolate to spatulate, hairless, evergreen leaves 10–20 mm long and 3–5 mm wide, and highly fragrant pink flowers in dense clusters of 6–8 together in spring. All parts of the plant are poisonous to humans.

== Taxonomy ==
Two subspecies are accepted by the Plants of the World Online database; the Euro+Med Plantbase also accepts a third subspecies.

- Daphne cneorum subsp. cneorum — throughout the species range
- Daphne cneorum subsp. arbusculoides (Tuzson) Soó — Austria, Hungary, and the northwestern Balkan Peninsula
- Daphne cneorum subsp. julia (Koso-Pol.) Halda — western Russia (included in subsp. cneorum by POWO)

== Etymology ==
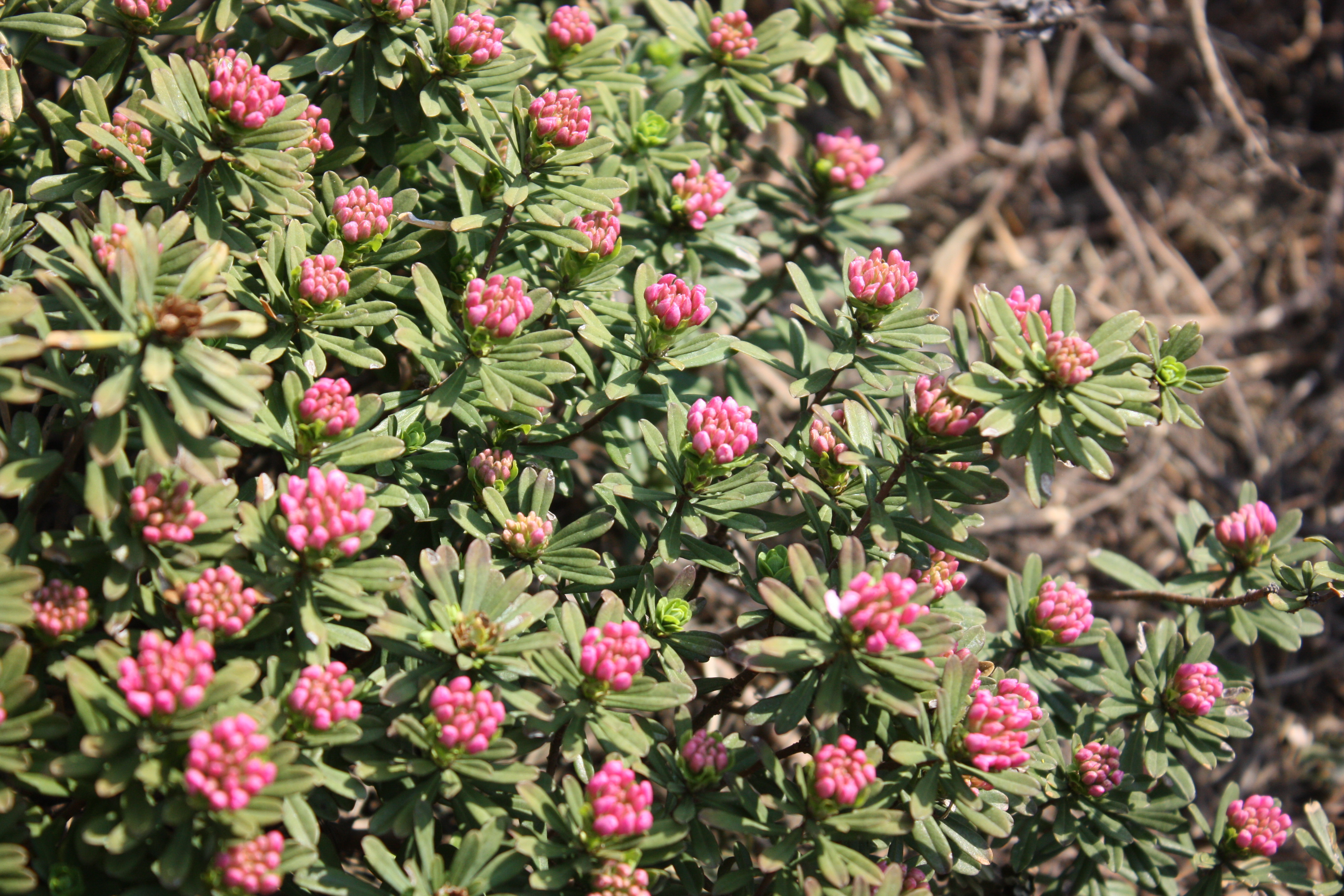
In bud, southeast of Kyiv, Ukraine, at 100 m altitude

The Latin specific epithet cneorum comes from Greek κνέορουμ "kneorum" and means 'like a small olive bush'.

== Habitat ==
In the mountains of central and western Europe, Daphne cneorum occurs in meadows and stony ground on limestone in mountains at altitudes up to 2150 m altitude or more. Further north and east, with colder climates, it occurs at lower altitudes, often on sandy soil; in northeastern France in the Pays de Bitche in the Vosges at 250–300 m altitude (where its survival depends on protection from commercial forestry intensification by land use as a military training ground); and in Ukraine, in the Lviv and Rivne areas and in the Dnipro valley in the Kyiv area where altitudes are around 100–200 m, typically in open pine, and mixed pine-oak and pine-beech forest habitats. Other species found in these habitats include Vaccinium myrtillus, Lycopodium annotinum, Pteridium aquilinum, Maianthemum bifolium and Trientalis europaea. Daphne cneorum is typically found in well-lit patches of rocky soil, the foundation of which is generally carbonate rock.

In the Boreal age, Daphne cneorum was predominantly found in pine forests, alongside other species such as Galium boreale and Rubus saxatilis.

== Cultivation ==
Daphne cneorum is popular for growing in alpine and rock gardens for its attractive, sweetly scented flowers; it requires moist, but well-drained soil.

=== Diseases ===
In cultivation, rose daphnes can be affected by various diseases. Two common diseases are 'daphne sudden death syndrome' (DSDS) caused by the fungus Thielaviopsis basicola, and daphne virus X.

In daphne sudden death syndrome, dark lesions grow along the roots, soon followed by browning of the leaves, stunted growth, wilting, and then in the two weeks after developing leaf symptoms, death.

One of the more common viruses affecting Daphne cneorum, and other species of the genus Daphne, is daphne virus X. It was discovered that in-vitro Daphne cneorum cultures can be used as a growing medium to detect if other plants are infected with the disease. This allows for faster identification of diseased plants, thus allowing for prevention of the spread to other plants within nurseries, gardens, etc.
