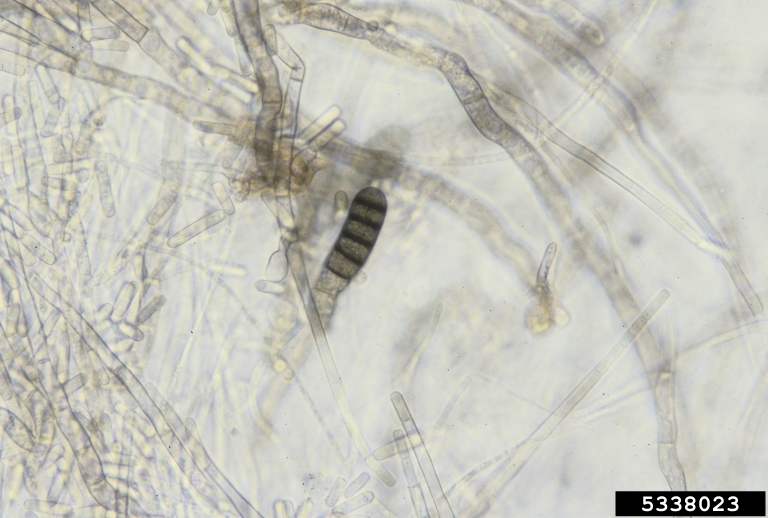
- Microscopic view of Thielaviopsis chlamydospores (black) and endoconidia (hyaline)

Scientific classification
- Kingdom: Fungi
- Division: Ascomycota
- Class: Sordariomycetes
- Order: Microascales
- Family: Ceratocystidaceae
- Genus: Thielaviopsis
- Species: T. basicola

Binomial name
- Thielaviopsis basicola (Berk. & Broome) Ferraris (1912)

Synonyms
- Chalara elegans Nag Raj & W.B. Kendr. (1975); Torula basicola Berk. & Broome (1850); Trichocladium basicola (Berk. & Broome) J.W. Carmich. (1980)

= Thielaviopsis basicola =

Species of fungus

Thielaviopsis basicola is the plant-pathogen fungus responsible for black root rot disease. This particular disease has a large host range, affecting woody ornamentals, herbaceous ornamentals, agronomic crops, and even vegetable crops. Examples of susceptible hosts include petunia, pansy, poinsettia, tobacco, cotton, carrot, lettuce, tomato, and others. Symptoms of this disease resemble nutrient deficiency but are truly a result of the decaying root systems of plants. Common symptoms include chlorotic lower foliage, yellowing of plant, stunting or wilting, and black lesions along the roots. The lesions along the roots may appear red at first, getting darker and turning black as the disease progresses. Black root lesions that begin in the middle of a root can also spread further along the roots in either direction. Due to the nature of the pathogen, the disease can easily be identified by the black lesions along the roots, especially when compared to healthy roots. The black lesions that appear along the roots are a result of the formation of chlamydospores, resting spores of the fungus that contribute to its pathogenicity. The chlamydospores are a dark brown-black color and cause the "discoloration" of the roots when they are produced in large amounts.

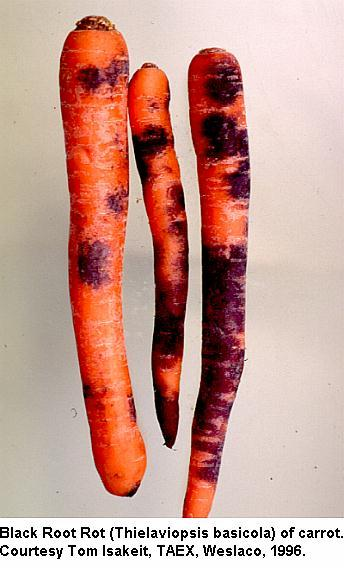
Black root rot.

== Environment ==
As a poor saprophyte and obligate parasite, T. basicola is often dependent upon favorable environmental conditions. Although the pathogen is able to grow in a variety of soil moistures, wet soil is optimal for greater infection since spores are able to move easily in water. Water plays a role in dispersal of spores and can lead to an increased infection rate. Soil temperatures also play an important role, as temperatures between 55 and 65 °F are favorable for the pathogen. However, temperatures that are higher than 86 °F are unfavorable for the fungus and only traces of the pathogen can be found. At lower temperatures, the severity of the disease increases since the temperatures become unfavorable for and induces stress on the hosts. Alkaline clay soils have proven to be conducive to pathogenicity and also favor the pathogen. This can be attributed to the fact that the pathogen is suppressed at soils with pH less than 5.2, so increasing pH is favorable for severity of disease. There are also cultural conditions which may induce stress on the host plants that favor the pathogen including high soluble salts, excessive nitrogen fertilizer, low organic matter, etc. When the plant undergoes stress due to cultural conditions, there is an increase in susceptibility to opportunistic pathogens such as T. basicola. For this reason, it is important to practice proper cultural conditions such as maintaining proper temperatures, amount of nitrogen fertilizer, and pH of the soil to reduce stress of host plants and decrease susceptibility to disease.

== Pathogenesis ==
Thielaviopsis basicola is a soilborne fungus that belongs to the Ascomycota division of the "true fungi" and is a hemibiotrophic parasite. Fungi belonging to Ascomycota are known to produce asexual and sexual spores, however, a sexual stage has yet to be observed and validated in the Thielaviopsis basicola life cycle, which classifies this species as one of the Deuteromycete or an imperfect fungus. During the asexual reproductive cycle of Thielaviopsis basicola, two types of asexual spores are borne from the hyphae including endoconidia and chlamydospores. Endoconidia are a distinctive type of conidium in that they develop within a hollow cavity inside a hyphal tube and are ejected from the end of this tube to disperse. Both of the aforementioned spores must first undergo physical dissemination in order to begin locating an infection court on a new, viable host. Aside from the normal translocation of spores within the soil environment, vectors such as shore flies have been observed carrying and aerially transmitting Thielaviopsis basicola spores, a phenomenon uncharacteristic of soilborne fungal pathogens. Upon landing on an infected plant, the shore flies feed on the infected tissue and ingest spores along with the plant material, only to excrete the hitchhiking spores in their frass, which ultimately lands on healthy plant tissue continuing the disease cycle. However, this association between vector and soilborne fungi has only been observed in commercial agricultural settings in which artificially controlled environments (i.e. greenhouses) promote conditions that deviate from the natural world.

Following dispersal (via vector-insect, cultural practice, or other translocation means within the soil matrix), the spores will detect an infection site on the host plant (usually root hairs) and germinate in response to the stimuli produced by the root exudates, some of which include sugars, lecithins, and unsaturated triglycerides. Germ tubes emerge from the spores and directly penetrate into the cells of the root hairs (typically the single-cell epidermal layer) via penetration hyphae. The living host plant will typically respond with the development of cell appositions called papillae, which attempt to block the pathogen from penetrating the cell wall and subsequently parasitizing the host's cells. However, most of these early defense mechanisms prove unsuccessful, hence the significance and prevalence of the disease around the world. Advancing, the vegetative hyphal cells differentiate into feeding structures that resemble haustoria, which absorb nutrients biotrophically from the host cells. Once the pathogen has breached the cell wall of the epidermal root cell, it proceeds to release effector compounds that disrupt the host's systemic defense mechanisms. Systemic acquired resistance (SAR) is employed by the host to actively address localized infection and initiate defense signaling cascades throughout the plant. For example, the SAR NPR1 (AtNPR1) gene is of special importance and acts to suppress the infection faculties of Thielaviopsis basicola, effectively imparting resistance to some host plants. Furthermore, research suggests that the NPR1 gene, when over-expressed in transgenic plants, aids in the expression of other defense-related genes such as PR1, effectively improving resistance to infection by Thielaviopsis basicola. NPR1 and its associated benefits for enhancing disease resistance have been recognized as possible tools to use when equipping economically indispensable crops with transgenic resistance to disease.

Once penetration and the establishment of biotrophic feeding structures are successful, the pathogen progresses into the root tissue leaving distinctive black/brown lesions in its wake (lesion coloration can be attributed to thick-walled chlamydospore clusters); it continues proliferating until eventually entering its necrotrophic stage. Hemibiotrophs, like Thielaviopsis basicola, transition from a biotrophic stage to a necrotrophic stage by way of a coordinated effort between different pathogenesis genes that secrete effector proteins capable of manipulating their host's defense system. Research suggests that during biotrophy, certain types of effectors from the pathogen are expressed over others and vice versa during the necrotrophic stage. Once the biotrophic stage is no longer preferred by the pathogen, it will initiate this complicated genetic transition and commence the necrotrophic stage. In order to digest and metabolize nutritive compounds from a necrotic host plant, Thielaviopsis basicola secretes enzymes such as xylanase and other hemicellulases, which break down cell tissues making them available to the fungus. During this stage, the pathogen also produces its asexual spores in the lesions to reproduce and disseminate more propagules for continued survival in the soil. In addition to its normal infection process, studies have shown that Thielaviopsis basicola and its pathogenesis are synergistically linked to a fortuitous coinfection process involving Meloidogyne incognita nematodes when the two are present in the same soil. It has been observed that the infection of host tissues by Meloidogyne incognita facilitates the infection of Thielaviopsis basicola into the root and vascular tissues, effectively allowing the fungal pathogen to optimize infection even when environmental conditions are suboptimal.

== Importance ==
Thielaviopsis basicola was discovered in the mid-1800s and has remained an important plant pathogen affecting ornamental and agricultural plants in over 31 countries around the world. The pathogen is known to stunt or delay maturity in the species it parasitizes, which, coupled with environmental limitations, can lead to severe economic losses. It has been observed that black root rot can delay plant maturity for up to a month and result in over a 40% yield reduction in the affected crop. One crop that is affected by Thielaviopsis basicola and that is of significant economic importance is cotton. In the United States alone, between the years 1995 and 2005, the total annual loss in revenue due to diseases in the cotton crop was $897 million. Thielaviopsis basicola was a significant contributor to that economic loss. In other parts of the world, such as in major cotton producer Australia, Thielaviopsis basicola has a very severe economic impact as well. In Australia, the disease was initially observed in sweet peas in the 1930s. However, black root rot spread to a range of cultivated hosts, especially into Australian cotton production. In fact, surveys taken in 2010 and 2011 of Australian agriculture statistics reported black root rot to be present in 93% of farms and 83% of fields studied. Of the fields affected, yield losses have reached 1.5 bales per acre. The national average of cotton production per hectare in Australia is about 10 bales, so a loss of 1.5 bales per acre (or roughly 3 bales per hectare) to black root rot adds up to a significant loss. In addition to cotton, carrot, lupin, cabbage, clover, and tobacco are all crops cultivated in many different countries that suffer from black root rot. Some important ornamental crops affected by black root rot include: Begonia sp. Daphne cneorum, poinsettia, African daisy, pansy, marigold, and petunia; the list is quite extensive. However, cultural practices have led to the eradication of this disease in many ornamental crops, including poinsettia. During the 1950s and 1960s, poinsettia production was ravaged by black root rot disease. Despite faltering, once the use of soil mixes was traded for soilless alternatives throughout the floriculture industry, black root rot was no longer a threat to poinsettias. Thielaviopsis basicola (black root rot) has been and will remain a significant threat to crops grown globally in both agricultural and horticultural systems.

== Disease cycle ==
Thielaviopsis basicola is a soil inhabiting disease. The pathogen typically colonizes root tissue in the first two to eight weeks of crop growth. This causes cortical cell death which gives a brown to blackened appearance in the roots. The death of root cells also reduces development of new tissue in both roots and shoots. Once the fungus has successfully infected, it grows vegetatively via hyphae and produces the two types of spores. In this particular situation, state means imperfect form of the fungi. The "chalara state produces endospores (conidia) and the Thielavopsis produces aleuriospores (chlamydospores). Chlamydospores survive in soil for many years". During wet and cool soil the spores will germinate. It is most "severe from 55° to 61°F, while only a trace of disease develops at 86°F. Alkaline soil favors the disease, which can be prevented at pH 4.8 and greatly reduced at pH 5.5 or below". The fungus can "spread via vectors including- fungus gnats and shore flies, from infected roots to healthy roots if they come into contact with each other and when spores (conidia) are splashed from pot to pot when watered".

== Management ==
=== Cultural Practices and Mechanical Measures ===
The first and foremost strategy for controlling T. basicola at the first sign of disease should be cultural control including- "maintaining a soil pH below 5.6, removing and destroying all diseased plants, using soil-less media, sterilizing equipment, keeping work areas clean, and controlling fungus gnats and shore flies. Fungus gnats and shore flies can be vectors; therefore, controlling these pests can lead to minimizing the spread of the fungus". In addition, "crop rotation is recommended for management of black root rot. Soil fumigants, such as chloropicrin, can be helpful for controlling seedbed and sterol inhibitors". Furthermore, "to avoid contamination of plants and potting media, greenhouse floors and walkways should be lightly misted with water to cut down on airborne dust transmission of T. basicola during cleaning operations". At the end of the "growing season, doing a thorough clean-up of the greenhouse can be beneficial because it reduces the possibility of the fungus surviving as a resistant chlamydospores on the soil floor and in wooden benches".

=== Disease Resistance ===
Disease resistance can be naturally coded in the genome of the host itself and induced via natural or artificial means, artificially introduced via a number of transgenic or breeding measures, and/or mutually associated with beneficial microbes found within soil ecosystems. Most, if not all, vascular plants utilize a system of defense, which consists of PAMP-triggered immunity (PTI) and effector-triggered immunity (ETI). Following localized infection and the influx of associated pathogen stimulants, the aforementioned immune system responses trigger systemic acquired resistance (SAR), which sets off a cascade of defense signaling throughout the plant to initiate defense strategies at distal locations targeted to attack any recognized foreign pathogens. However, even with these innate lines of defense, the pathogen often prevails. This calls for selective breeding, genetic manipulation, or other novel biological control methods. Assessing varieties/cultivars for disease resistance and breeding for selected resistance traits is an important management method utilized by growers and breeders in the fight against Thielaviopsis basicola. Commercially available resistant species of plants, include select varieties of Japanese holly (among other species of holly) and woody plants such as boxwood and barberry. However, in some important crops like cotton, no commercially viable cultivars have been bred with sufficient resistance against black root rot. Interestingly, in Australia, researchers have identified diploid cotton species displaying marked resistance against black root rot, yet cross-breeding these traits into viable commercial crops has proven to be difficult. Similarly, researchers in Poland have uncovered innate disease resistance in the germplasm of a wild-type relative of Nicotiana tabacum called Nicotiana glauca. Moreover, disease resistance genes derived from Nicotiana debneyi (a relative of the previously mentioned tobacco species) have successfully been incorporated into tobacco varieties displaying resilience to multiple races of Thielaviopsis basicola. That being said, selective variety breeding is not the only source of resistance to black root rot in modern plant pathology. Transgenic methods of disease management offer promising new avenues scientists can take to aid in adapting plants to increasingly virulent pathogens. One such mechanism includes the manipulation of the expression of the NPR1 gene in the host plant defense genome sequences. By over-expressing NPR1 genes transgenically in host plants such as cotton, scientists were able to increase the induction of PR genes like PR1 and LIPOXYGENASE1, which led to enhanced resistance by improving yield and limiting stunting. In addition to genetic tools, inventive plant pathologists are exploring other novel methods of control, which include beneficial microbes and biological control agents (BCAs), among many others. Symbiotic associations between arbuscular mycorrhizal fungi and plant roots are well-documented, yet scientists studying host-plant defense have discovered this association may be more arcane than previously thought. Some researchers suggest this association extends to the realm of disease resistance and defense. This phenomenon was analyzed in research conducted by German scientists who studied the transcript expression of defense related genes in Petunia hybrida when they were exposed to Thielaviopsis basicola and also colonized by arbuscular mycorrhizal fungal networks in their rhizosphere. They found that the arbuscular mycorrhiza (AM) symbiosis functioned as a first line of defense by antagonizing the pathogenic fungus before it could ever induce a defense response in the host itself. Thus, it is not inconceivable that control measures involving biotic compliments, such as AM, may be used in the future to control for disease presence in agricultural fields without the use of deleterious chemicals and/or genetic meddling.

== Infected plants ==
See:

- List of alfalfa diseases
- List of African daisy diseases
- List of carrot diseases
- List of chickpea diseases
- List of cineraria diseases
- List of citrus diseases
- List of cotton diseases
- List of cucurbit diseases
- List of cyclamen diseases
- List of flax diseases
- List of fuchsia diseases
- List of geranium diseases
- List of lentil diseases
- List of pea diseases
- List of peanut diseases
- List of poinsettia diseases
- List of red clover diseases
- List of soybean diseases
- List of tobacco diseases
- List of tomato diseases
- List of verbena diseases
