= Septoria cucurbitacearum =

Scientific classification
- Kingdom: Fungi
- Division: Ascomycota
- Class: Dothideomycetes
- Order: Capnodiales
- Family: Mycosphaerellaceae
- Genus: Septoria
- Species: S. cucurbitacearum

Binomial name
- Septoria cucurbitacearum Sacc. (1876)

Species of fungus

Septoria cucurbitacearum is a fungal plant pathogen infecting cucurbits. Symptoms of Septoria leaf spot are similar on all the cucurbits infected.

== Description ==
Spots are normally circular or occasionally irregular, beige to nearly white in color, measuring 1 to 2 mm in diameter or occasionally larger on the upper leaf surface. A narrow brown border surrounds the spot and, with age, the lesion may crack. When the disease first appears in the spring under moist conditions, the spots appear with or without a white speck surrounded by a much larger brown water-soaked border, giving the appearance of a different disease. The distinguishing sign on older spots is the presence of small, black, speck-like fruiting bodies called pycnidia embedded within the tissue. Not all spots will contain pycnidia, but some may contain up to eight or more. The black specks can be seen with an unaided eye. Under moist conditions, long, thin, needle-like conidia are released. Small (1 to 2 mm) erumpent whitish spots appear as a rash on the surface of infected Butternut and Pumpkin fruit. Pycnidia of Septoria are not often found on these whitish spots, but other organisms including Cucurbit Anthracnose (Colletotrichum orbiculare) and Black dot (Colletotrichum coccodes) sometimes invade these lesions.
