= Trisporic acid =

Group of chemical compounds

- Trisporic acid A

- Trisporic acid B

- Trisporic acid C

Identifiers
CAS Number	A: 161023-29-6; B: 26057-02-3; C: 26055-09-4
3D model (JSmol)	A: Interactive image; B: Interactive image; C: Interactive image
ChEBI	CHEBI:91017
ChemSpider	B: 109121640; C: 8645830
PubChem CID	A: 90471808; B: 90470632; C: 101306749
- InChI: A: InChI=1S/C18H26O3/c1-5-6-7-8-13(2)9-10-15-14(3)16(19)11-12-18(15,4)17(20)21/h8-10H,5-7,11-12H2,1-4H3,(H,20,21)/b10-9+,13-8+/t18-/m0/s1 Key: OSQWPUQNCKZCOA-WVPSHWIESA-N; B: InChI=1S/C18H24O4/c1-12(6-5-7-13(2)19)8-9-15-14(3)16(20)10-11-18(15,4)17(21)22/h6,8-9H,5,7,10-11H2,1-4H3,(H,21,22)/b9-8+,12-6+/t18-/m0/s1 Key: AUOKEERYXZUYBN-YEOBPPCSSA-N; C: InChI=1S/C18H26O4/c1-12(6-5-7-13(2)19)8-9-15-14(3)16(20)10-11-18(15,4)17(21)22/h6,8-9,13,19H,5,7,10-11H2,1-4H3,(H,21,22)/b9-8+,12-6+/t13-,18+/m1/s1 Key: JYCOWXFWTZCULN-KSUWSPNXSA-N
- SMILES: A: CCCC/C=C(\C)/C=C/C1=C(C(=O)CC[C@]1(C)C(=O)O)C; B: CC1=C([C@@](CCC1=O)(C)C(=O)O)/C=C/C(=C/CCC(=O)C)/C; C: CC1=C([C@@](CCC1=O)(C)C(=O)O)/C=C/C(=C/CC[C@@H](C)O)/C

Properties
Chemical formula	A: C_{18}H_{26}O_{3} B: C_{18}H_{24}O_{4} C: C_{18}H_{26}O_{4}
Molar mass	A: 290.40 g/mol B: 304.39 g/mol C: 306.40 g/mol
- Except where otherwise noted, data are given for materials in their standard state (at 25 °C [77 °F], 100 kPa). Infobox references

Trisporic acids (TSAs) are C-18 terpenoid compounds synthesized via β-carotene and retinol pathways in the zygomycetes. They are pheromone compound responsible for sexual differentiation in those fungal species. TSAs and related compounds make up the trisporoid group of chemicals.

== History ==
Trisporic acid was discovered in 1964 as a metabolite that caused enhanced carotene production in Blakeslea trispora. It was later shown to be the hormone that brought about zygophore production in Mucor mucedo. The American mycologist and geneticist Albert Francis Blakeslee, discovered that some species of Mucorales were self-sterile (heterothallic), in which interactions of two strains, designated (+) and (-), being necessary for the initiation of sexual activity. This interaction was found by Hans Burgeff of the University of Goettingen to be due to the exchange of low molecular weight substances that diffused through the substratum and atmosphere. This work constituted the first demonstration of sex hormone activity in any fungus. The elucidation of the hormonal control of sexual interaction in the Mucorales extends over 60 years and involved mycologists and biochemists from Germany, Italy, the Netherlands, UK and the USA.

== Functions in Mucorales ==
Recognition of compatible sexual partners in zygomycota is based on a cooperative biosynthesis pathway of trisporic acid. Early trisporoid derivatives and trisporic acid induce swelling of two potential hyphae, hence called zygophores, and a chemical gradient of these inducer molecules results in a growth towards each other. These progametangia come in contact with each other and build a strong connection. In the next stage, septae are established to limit the developing zygospore from the vegetative mycelium and in this way the zygophores become suspensor hyphae and gametangia are formed. After dissolving of the fusion wall, cytoplasm and a high number of nuclei from both gametangia are mixed. A selectional process (unstudied) results in a reduction of nuclei and meiosis takes place (also unstudied until today). Several cell wall modifications, as well as incorporation of sporopollenin (dark colour of spores) take place resulting in a mature zygospore.

Triporic acid, as the endpoint of this recognition pathway, can solely be produced in presence of both compatible partners, which enzymatically produce trisporoid precursors to be further utilized by the potential sexual partner. Species specificity of these reactions is among others obtained by spatial segregation, physicochemical features of derivatives (volatility and light sensitivity), chemical modifications of trisporoids and transcriptional/posttranscriptional regulation.

== Biosynthesis ==
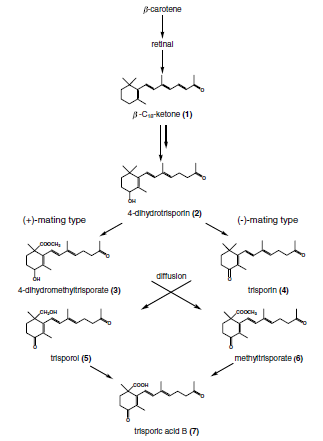
Postulated biosynthesis of trisporic acid B

== Parasexualism ==
Trisporoids are also used in the mediation of the recognition between parasite and host. An example is the host-parasite interaction of a parasexual nature observed between Parasitella parasitica, a facultative mycoparasite of zygomycetes, and Absidia glauca. This interaction is an example for biotrophic fusion parasitism, because genetic information is transferred into the host. Many morphological similarities in comparison to zygospore formation are seen, but the mature spore is called a sikyospore and is parasitic. During this process, gall-like structures are produced by the host Absidia glauca. This coupled with further evidence has led to the assumption that trisporiods are not strictly species specific and that trisporiods represent the general principle of mating recognition in Mucorales.
