= Peanut green mosaic virus =

Virus classification
- Group: Group IV ((+)ssRNA)
- Family: Potyviridae
- Genus: Potyvirus
- Species: Peanut green mosaic virus

Synonyms
- peanut chlorotic mottle viru

Species of virus

Peanut green mosaic virus is a plant pathogenic virus of the family Potyviridae. A virus belonging to the potyvirus group known as the peanut green mosaic virus can be observed in the Chittoor district in Andhra Pradesh, India. Infection can be seen across groundnut, French bean, and soy bean plants. Three virus isolates produced different symptoms within the host. Based on tests performed on Phaseolus vulgaris or green beans, it was concluded that all three strains cause local lesions on inoculated leaves. However, one virus caused a non-systemic infection (NS), another caused systemic mosaic (SM), and the third caused systemic venial necrosis (SN). Infection is predominantly established in young leaflets. NS strains produced light and dark spots on its host, but no effect on growth and leaflet size observed. SM strains produced chlorotic spots and did impair leaflet size and plant growth. SN strains produced severe vein clearing and impaired growth in leaflet and plant size. Various types of antisera work on this virus.
