= Gummy stem blight =

Fungal plant disease

Gummy stem blight is a cucurbit-rot disease caused by the fungal plant pathogen Didymella bryoniae (anamorph Phoma cucurbitacearum). Gummy stem blight can affect a host at any stage of growth in its development and affects all parts of the host including leaves, stems and fruits. Symptoms generally consist of circular dark tan lesions that blight the leaf, water soaked leaves, stem cankers, and gummy brown ooze that exudes from cankers, giving it the name gummy stem blight. Gummy stem blight reduces yields of edible cucurbits by devastating the vines and leaves and rotting the fruits. There are various methods to control gummy stem blight, including use of treated seed, crop rotation, using preventative fungicides, eradication of diseased material, and deep plowing previous debris.

== Hosts and symptoms ==
Gummy stem blight affects many cucurbits including watermelon, cantaloupe, cucumber, pumpkin, and some squash. Some symptoms are common of all gummy stem blight infections while other symptoms can vary depending on the specific host the pathogen has infected. Hosts can become infected at any time in their life. When the pathogen is present in a young seedling, the cotyledons will sprout appearing dark and drenched. When older plants become infected, their leaves may appear water soaked and begin to develop dark tan lesions. The leaves begin to turn brown at the margins and necrosis progresses towards the base of the leaf.

Cankers, which may or may not have black spots, may appear in the epidermal cortical tissue and on the stems of infected plants. Black spots, if visible, are pycnidia and/or perithecia. Black rot is a common symptom on the fruit of gummy stem blight infected cucurbits. Lesions formed on the fruit; start as water soaked spots that expand and exude gummy ooze. As the spots grow they develop fruiting bodies which turn the spots black. Fruit can also rot internally, with the only symptoms being shriveling and discoloration of centrally located tissue. Fruit rot can occur while in the field or after fruit has been harvested.

D. bryoniae produces signs of infection such as white aerial mycelium, olive-green substrate mycelium and pycnidia. P. cucurbitacearum produces sparse serial mycelium and many pycnidia are present. Young leaves and cotelydons of melon and watermelon that are immature are at high risk to the gummy stem blight infection whereas cucumber and some squash are resistant at young age and only become susceptible once they have matured.

== Disease cycle ==
D. bryoniae is an Ascomycota fungus. In spring, asexual fruiting bodies called pycnidia and sexual fruiting bodies called perithecia are formed from last year's infected plant debris. Pycnidia are flask-shaped structures that house asexual conidia which are readily released from pycnidia through the ostiole when enough moisture is present. Perithecia are also flask-shaped, but they are sexual fruiting bodies which give rise to bitunicate asci that contain 8 ascospores. Ascospores are readily dispersed and spread by wind after rain or during evening dew periods.

Temperature and moisture are the most important factors for germination and development of the pathogen on the plant, with moisture being most important of all. Free moisture must be present on susceptible leaves for at least one hour in order for germination of spores to occur. The pathogen can enter a healthy host in a variety of ways. With enough moisture, conidia directly penetrate through the cuticle and infect healthy cucurbits. Wounds to the plant, especially those left by feeding insects such as the striped cucumber beetle or aphids, are important passageways for the pathogen to enter in older hosts. Other diseases, like powdery mildew, can also weaken a host enough to provide easy entry for D. bryoniae. After spore germination, symptoms can appear as soon as 7 days later.

D. bryoniae survives on or in seeds, surrounding weeds, or organic debris from previously infected cucurbits. Without a host, the pathogen is able to overwinter and survive for over a year as chlamydospores, hardened masses of hyphae that act as survival structures during dry or otherwise adverse conditions. The pathogen is transferred from infected hosts to healthy plants via ascospores carried in the wind and by conidia that are released from pycnidia by water splash and in gummy exude. Conidia are hyaline and aseptate if produced by the anamorph, and either septate or aseptate (more common) if produced by the teleomorph form of the pathogen.

The host must remain wet for growth and spread of the disease. Once the primary infection takes place, as long as it remains wet, the pathogen will spread to the stem where cankers form and ooze a gummy substance full of conidia. Conidia spread from the gummy ooze to another host is considered the secondary asexual cycle.

== Environmental presence ==
Gummy stem blight occurs throughout the southern and eastern United States. Temperature and moisture are the most important factors in the spread of gummy stem blight. For watermelon and cucumber, the best temperature for infection is around 25 °C; for melon the best temperature is around 20 °C. Continual leaf wetness from 1–10 hours is necessary for germination, sporulation, and colonization of conidia. After infection has set in, large brown lesions will retain moisture for long periods of time. Even though it takes constant moisture to facilitate the pathogen, it is highly resistant to dry conditions and can survive as chlamydospores for over a year in dry organic debris.

== Management ==
There are currently no varieties of cucurbit completely resistant to D. bryoniae. Cultural practices and preventive techniques can be taken to avoid or reduce harm done by D. bryoniae. Purchasing and planting reputable disease-free seeds is necessary for ensuring D. bryoniae will not be present at planting. A rotation (of at least 2 years) of cucurbit and non-cucurbit crops should be performed to greatly reduce the incidence of gummy stem blight. Since gummy stem blight can survive as chlamydospores in dead plant debris, it is recommended to remove or deep-plow dead cucurbit plant debris into the soil so it can fully decompose to lessen the likelihood of the pathogen overwintering. Keeping fields pruned and weed-free will help to control gummy stem blight as overgrowth promotes poor air circulation and moisture from humidity, which support D. bryoniae germination and growth. If chemical control is needed in important cucurbit production regions, there are a variety of preventative fungicides commercially available that can be applied during the early stages of plant growth. Effective contact fungicides include chlorothalonil and mancozeb; effective systemic fungicides are sold under the names Folicur/Monsoon, Inspire Super, and Switch. These fungicides should be applied around when the vines of different crops start to grow and make contact with each other.

== Importance ==
Yield losses due to D. bryoniae exceeding 30% can occur in early season crops facilitated by wet weather conditions. Curcurbits are important commodity crops in many parts of the world. In the United States in 2007, cucurbit production accounted for approximately 229,000 hectares with a value of $1.43 billion.
