= Oidium arachidis =

Scientific classification
- Kingdom: Fungi
- Division: Ascomycota
- Class: Leotiomycetes
- Order: Helotiales
- Family: Erysiphaceae
- Genus: Oidium
- Species: O. arachidis

Binomial name
- Oidium arachidis Chorin, (1961)

Species of fungus

Oidium arachidis (commonly known as powdery mildew) is a fungal plant pathogen which affects peanuts, peas, and ground nuts. It presents as a powdery white mildew. Affected plants may develop brown or black spots.
