= Calonectria ilicicola =

Scientific classification
- Domain: Eukaryota
- Kingdom: Fungi
- Division: Ascomycota
- Class: Sordariomycetes
- Order: Hypocreales
- Family: Nectriaceae
- Genus: Calonectria
- Species: C. ilicicola

Binomial name
- Calonectria ilicicola Boedijn & Reitsma (1950)

Synonyms
- Calonectria theae var. crotalariae Loos (1950); Calonectria crotalariae (Loos) D.K.Bell & Sobers (1966); Cylindrocladium crotalariae (Loos) D.K.Bell & Sobers (1966); Cylindrocladium parasiticum Crous, M.J.Wingf. & Alfenas (1993); Cercosporella theae var. crotalariae Loos ex Crous, M.J.Wingf. & Alfenas (1993)

Species of fungus

Calonectria ilicicola is a fungal plant pathogen in the family Nectriaceae. It has been found to cause leaf spot in holly (Ilex spp.), root rot in blueberry, red crown rot in soybean, a root and crown rot of anthurium, and a soft rot of ginger.

== See also ==
- List of soybean diseases
