= Leandria momordicae =

Scientific classification
- Kingdom: Fungi
- Division: Ascomycota
- Class: Ascomycetes
- Order: incertae sedis
- Family: incertae sedis
- Genus: Leandria
- Species: L. momordicae

Binomial name
- Leandria momordicae Rangel (1915)

Species of fungus

Leandria momordicae is an ascomycete fungus that is a plant pathogen.
