= Monosporascus eutypoides =

Scientific classification
- Domain: Eukaryota
- Kingdom: Fungi
- Division: Ascomycota
- Class: Sordariomycetes
- Order: Xylariales
- Family: Diatrypaceae
- Genus: Monosporascus
- Species: M. eutypoides

Binomial name
- Monosporascus eutypoides (Petr.) Arx (1976)

Synonyms
- Rechingeriella eutypoides Petr. (1954); Bitrimonospora indica Sivan., Talde & Tilak (1974)

Species of fungus

Monosporascus eutypoides is a species of fungus in the family Diatrypaceae. It is a plant pathogen.
