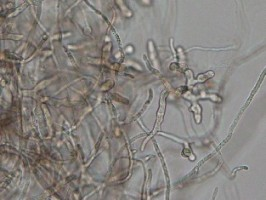
- Pythium myriotylum

Scientific classification
- Domain: Eukaryota
- Clade: Sar
- Clade: Stramenopiles
- Phylum: Oomycota
- Class: Peronosporomycetes
- Order: Peronosporales
- Family: Pythiaceae
- Genus: Pythium
- Species: P. myriotylum

Binomial name
- Pythium myriotylum Drechsler, (1930)

= Pythium myriotylum =

Species of single-celled organism

Pythium myriotylum is a soil-borne oomycete necrotroph that has a broad host range, this means that it can infect a wide range of plants.

== Hosts and symptoms ==
Pythium myriotylum is a causal agent of soft root rot in economically important crops including peanuts, tomato, rye, wheat, oats, cucumber, soybean, sorghum, tobacco, cabbage, and maize. Pythium myriotylum causes pre-emergence damping off, it infects the seed and causes it to rot before plant growth. This causes the plant seedling to become shriveled, soft, and brown. In a study done on soybeans, some symptoms that were seen were rotting of roots, diseased seedlings in the field, plus rotting and blight of seedlings. Pythium myriotylum can also cause post-emergence damping off in peanuts, resulting in discoloration of the seedlings and roots along with a water-soaked appearance in certain areas, these symptoms usually result in the death of the seedlings.

== Disease cycle ==
Pythium myriotylum causes disease through direct penetration of the host with appressoria. The oomycete helps invade and colonize the host by secreting cell wall degrading enzymes (CWDEs) this breaks down the plant cell wall. P. myriotylum has an asexual reproductive cycle that consists of mycelium that produce sporangia. These sporangia germinate by producing zoospores with two flagella that help with zoospore movement. The zoospores are released during wet conditions so that they can move through the soil to infect new hosts. It also has a sexual reproductive system where mating occurs between the oogonium and antheridium. This produces a thick-walled structure called an oospore. Pythium myriotylum has an overwintering stage through the oospore, also known as, the survival structure. This is the initial innoculum that germinates after its resting period. It is difficult to break the dormancy of P. myriotylum oospores.

== Environment ==
Pythium myriotylum is a soil-borne necrotrophic oomycete. A disease caused by Pythium myriotylum is increased in warm regions, or in summer months. It thrives in high humid conditions. It prefers wet soil conditions in places of low altitude because this is where the water will sit for long periods of time. In lower altitudes, it can also contaminate irrigation water supplies and spread rapidly to other crops, especially hydroponically grown crops.

== See also ==
- List of soybean diseases
