= Sclerotium cinnamomi =

Scientific classification
- Kingdom: Fungi
- Division: Basidiomycota
- Class: Agaricomycetes
- Order: Agaricales
- Family: Typhulaceae
- Genus: Sclerotium
- Species: S. cinnamomi

Binomial name
- Sclerotium cinnamomi Heer

Species of fungus

Sclerotium cinnamomi is a fungal plant pathogen in the family Typhulaceae. It can cause 2–5 mm crusty black sclerotia on decaying plant matter.
