= Monosporascus cannonballus =

Scientific classification
- Domain: Eukaryota
- Kingdom: Fungi
- Division: Ascomycota
- Class: Sordariomycetes
- Order: Xylariales
- Family: Diatrypaceae
- Genus: Monosporascus
- Species: M. cannonballus

Binomial name
- Monosporascus cannonballus Pollack & Uecker (1974)

Species of fungus

Monosporascus cannonballus is a species of fungus in the family Diatrypaceae. It is a plant pathogen that causes vine decline of melon and watermelon crops.
