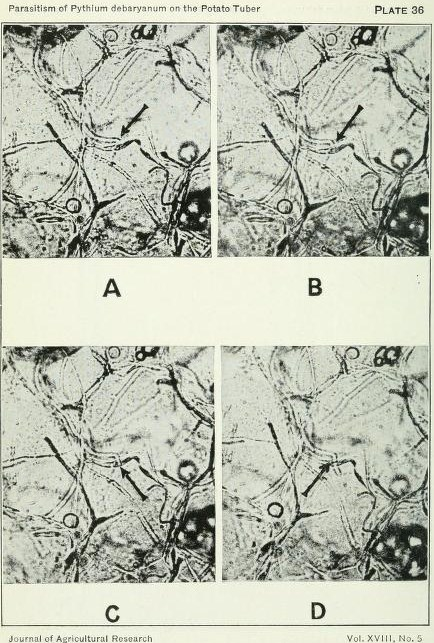
- Photographs enlarged from portions of a motion photomicrograph, showing the method of cell wall penetration by Pythium hyphae. A. — Shows hypha growing toward the potato cell wall. B. — Shows hypha attached to wall and about to penetrate. C. — The tip has just broken through the wall. D. — The penetration is complete. Note the black line at the point where the hypha penetrates the wall. This may be due to a rolling up of the potato cell wall about the hypha or to a difference in refraction caused by compression of the wall.

Scientific classification
- Domain: Eukaryota
- Clade: Sar
- Clade: Stramenopiles
- Phylum: Oomycota
- Class: Peronosporomycetes
- Order: Peronosporales
- Family: Pythiaceae
- Genus: Pythium
- Species: P. debaryanum

Binomial name
- Pythium debaryanum R. Hesse (1874)

Synonyms
- Eupythium debaryanum (R. Hesse) Nieuwl., (1916)

= Pythium debaryanum =

Species of single-celled organism

Pythium debaryanum is a species of water mould in the family Pythiaceae. It is known as a plant pathogen on many kinds of wild and cultivated plants, including peanut, beet, eucalyptus, tobacco, and pine trees. The plants develop damping off, a disease state.

== See also ==
- List of soybean diseases
