= Phialophora gregata =

Scientific classification
- Kingdom: Fungi
- Division: Ascomycota
- Class: Eurotiomycetes
- Order: Chaetothyriales
- Family: Herpotrichiellaceae
- Genus: Phialophora
- Species: P. gregata

Binomial name
- Phialophora gregata (Allington & D.W. Chamb.) W. Gams, (1971)

Synonyms
- Cadophora gregata Cephalosporium gregatum

Species of fungus

Phialophora gregata is a deuteromycete fungus that is a plant pathogen which causes the disease commonly known as brown stem rot of soybean. P. gregata does not produce survival structures, but has the ability to overwinter as mycelium in decaying soybean residue.

Two strains of the fungus exist; genotype A causes both foliar and stem symptoms, while genotype B causes only stem symptoms. Common leaf symptoms are browning, chlorosis, and necrosis Foliar symptoms which are often seen with genotype A are chlorosis, defoliation, and wilting.

Brown stem rot of soybeans is a common fungal disease in soybeans grown in the upper Midwest and Canada. Brown stem rot (BSR) may commonly reduce yield of soybeans by 10-30% on susceptible varieties, up to 10 bu./acre in severe cases. BSR decreases both the number of beans per pod as well as bean size as a result of wilting, premature defoliation and lodging. In addition to decreasing yield, plants infected by BSR can be difficult to harvest due to lodging of soybean plants. University of Wisconsin Extension Field Crop Pathologist Damon Smith ranks brown stem rot as the third most important soybean disease in Wisconsin. Brown stem rot can impact most susceptible soybean beans in the north central states, especially during cooler late summer months.

There are many ways to manage Phialophora gregata. The most effective form of management is disease resistance. Crop rotation, tillage, SCN management, and changing the pH of the soil can also be effective.

== Symptoms and signs ==
Phialophora gregata’s infection of a soybean plant is accompanied by browning of the plant’s vascular and pith tissues. The plant often exhibits chlorosis and necrosis as well as leaf browning. Wilting and defoliation are also known to occur. Signs of infection often go unnoticed until reproductive stages of a plant’s life cycle. They can be diagnosed earlier on by opening the stem and visualizing the pathogen. One can visualize signs by cutting open the stem in early stages of infection, but symptoms do not become apparent until after the soybean pod formation.

Depending on which strain infects the plant, and environmental conditions, the effect is more or less potent. Genotype A causes browning of stems as well as foliar symptoms such as interveinal chlorosis, defoliation and wilting. Symptomatic leaves have a shriveled appearance, but remain attached to the stem. Genotype B causes only browning of stems.

Secondary symptoms of brown stem rot are stunting, premature death, decrease in seed number, reduced pod set, and decrease in seed size.

Disease from P. gregata is easily confused with Fusarium wilt, due to the similar vascular symptoms observed in both. The diseases could be differentiated through growth on isolation media. The two diseases can be further distinguished by splitting the stems. A split stem with Fusarium infection would have tan or light brown discoloration in the cortex and a normal white pith, while a split stem with P. gregata would have a discolored, reddish brown pith. Root rot and blue masses of spores are symptoms only caused by Fusarium.

== Environment ==
The fungal pathogen, Phialophora gregata, that causes brown stem rot (BSR) of soybeans prefers conditions that are also optimal to soybean plant growth. Later planted soybeans are more susceptible to BSR as cooler temperatures during early pod forming stages make the plant most vulnerable. Early season wet conditions can also favor early season pathogen growth, often causing more dramatic affects later in season. Foliar symptoms of BSR are favored when conditions are cool during flowering and pod formation. The Phialophora gregata pathogen proliferates in stem tissues when soil has high moisture content and air temperatures remain near 60-75 degrees Fahrenheit. Fungal growth of Phialophora gregata shuts down above 80 degrees Fahrenheit. Low water available to the plant late in the season can dramatically increase disease severity.

As the disease is soilborne, it is not uncommon to find clusters of diseased plants together.

The prevalence of soybean cyst nematodes (SCN) can affect the growth of Phialophora gregata. Greater populations of SCN can greatly increase the likelihood and impact of brown stem rot.

== Disease cycle ==
The Phialophora gregata fungus is a deuteromycete with a monocyclic life cycle. It produces no survival structures, but can overwinter as mycelium in decaying soybean residue. During overwintering, conidia are produced; these conidia are the inoculum for new plants in the spring. The amount of asexual reproduction that occurs during the winter affects the spring inoculum levels. Infection initially occurs in the roots of young soybean plants, and then spreads to the stem (and foliage, depending on the strain). Generally, early and severe foliar symptoms indicate that the yield losses will be heavier.

== Economic significance ==
Brown stem rot of soybeans is a source of major crop loss. It is not uncommon for soybeans grown in management systems prone to brown stem rot to have yield losses between 10%, with a maximum potential loss of 30%. It has been listed as the 3rd most important disease to soybeans in Wisconsin. A recent study showed that nearly half the counties in Iowa, from 2006 and 2007, had brown stem rot of soybean.

== Management ==
Brown stem rot can be easily managed using several techniques employed by the grower. Common techniques include crop rotation, tillage, selection and soybean cyst nematode management. There are currently no available seed treatments or fungicides to prevent or protect against BSR.

Crop rotation

The easiest and most effective way to protect against brown stem rot in soybeans is crop rotation. Phialophora gregata has no overwintering structures but instead lives in plant debris. Due to this, waiting until plant debris has decomposed (at least one full growing season) is the most effective way to control this disease. In cases of severe infection 2–3 years without planting soybeans in infected fields may be necessary.

=== Disease resistance ===
Given the sizable impact of Phialophora gregata on commercial soybean yields, research and development have gone into selecting soybean varieties that have greater resistance to BSR, although not immunity.

Brown stem rot has the uncanny ability to produce yield loss even without obvious symptoms.

Higher-rated BSR tolerance in beans can be selected for when choosing a variety to be grown. Genetic resistance should not be relied upon when expected BSR pressure is high. Additionally, choosing varieties higher rated for tolerance against soybean cyst nematode can be effective.

=== Tillage ===
More decomposition of soybean residue results in less pathogen, as the fungus can only survive on soybean residue. Therefore, tillage can be effective. Once the soybean residue has decomposed, the survival of P. gregata is drastically decreased. It is common for farmers to practice both crop rotations and tillage in a cyclic fashion. This is done by conducting little to no tillage when a soybean crop is planted after corn, followed by intensive tillage when a corn crop is planted after soybean.

=== Management of soybean cyst nematode (Heterodera glycines) ===
P. gregata is often found to be more severe in the presence of SCN. Soybean plants showing resistance to SCN have been found to produce greater yields. Soybean plants with resistance to both SCN and genotype A of P. gregata can grow normally, even when both pathogens are present. Given the correlation between SCN populations and disease impact of BSR it is important to control SCN. SCN can be controlled using rotation to non-susceptible crops, seed treatments, variety selection and nematicides.

=== Monitoring soil pH ===
Maintaining a soil pH near 6.5-7.5 can also help protect against BSR. There is evidence of significantly lower disease severity with a near neutral soil pH, although there is no evidence to suggest a neutral pH prevents BSR.
