= Fusarium equiseti =

Scientific classification
- Domain: Eukaryota
- Kingdom: Fungi
- Division: Ascomycota
- Class: Sordariomycetes
- Order: Hypocreales
- Family: Nectriaceae
- Genus: Fusarium
- Species: F. equiseti

Binomial name
- Fusarium equiseti (Corda) Sacc.

Synonyms
- Fusarium equiseti var. crassum Wollenw., Fusaria autographica delineata 3: no. 921 (1930); Selenosporium equiseti Corda, Icon. fung. (Prague) 2: 7 (1838)

Species of fungus

Fusarium equiseti is a fungal species and plant pathogen on a varied range of crops.

It is considered to be a weak pathogen on cereals and is occasionally found to be associated with 'Fusarium head blight' infected kernels. It is commonly found in tropical and sub-tropical areas.

The species has been reported to be a causal organism of wilt in Capsicum chinense in Mexico in 2016.

Fusarium equiseti is also one of the causal organisms for causing chilli wilt in Kashmir along with other fungi species; Fusarium oxysporum and Fusarium solani.
