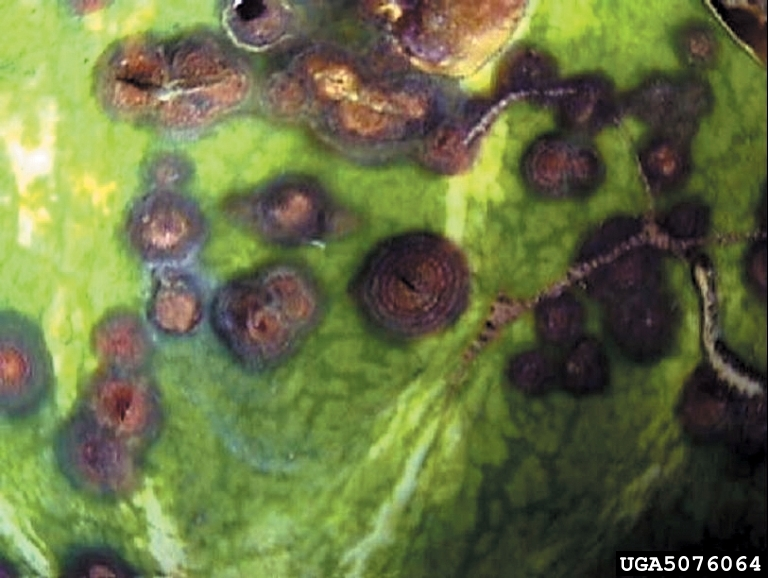

Scientific classification
- Kingdom: Fungi
- Division: Ascomycota
- Class: Sordariomycetes
- Order: Glomerellales
- Family: Glomerellaceae
- Genus: Colletotrichum
- Species: C. orbiculare

Binomial name
- Colletotrichum orbiculare (Berk. & Mont.) Arx, (1957)

Synonyms
- Colletotrichum lagenaria (Pass.) Ellis & Halst. [as 'lagenarium'], (1893); Colletotrichum oligochaetum Cavara, (1889); Cytospora orbicularis Berk., (1838); Fusarium lagenaria Pass. [as 'lagenarium'] Gloeosporium lagenaria (Pass.) Sacc. & Roum. [as 'lagenarium'], (1880); Gloeosporium orbiculare (Berk.) Sacc., (1884); Glomerella cingulata var. orbiculare S.F. Jenkins & Winstead, (1962); Glomerella lagenaria (Pass.) F. Stevens [as 'lagenarium'], (1931); Glomerella lagenaria F. Stevens, (1931); Myxosporium orbiculare (Berk.) Berk., (1860); Sirogloea orbicularis (Berk.) Arx, (1957)

= Colletotrichum orbiculare =

Species of fungus

Colletotrichum orbiculare is a plant pathogen of melons and cucumber. It causes the disease anthracnose that can effect curcubits causing lesions on various parts of the plant. It can affect cucumbers, melon, squash, watermelon and pumpkin, especially when the weather is rainy, humid and warm. It can be transmitted by seed as well as soil and survive between crops. It is also spread by feeding cucumber beetles, splashing water, tools and workers. Efforts to control the fungus include the practice of rotating cucurbits out for a 2-year period, planting cultivars with resistance, burning infected crops and careful control of weeds. Chemical control measures are also available.

== Management ==
Partners of the CABI-led programme, Plantwise from the Ministry of Agriculture in Zambia have several recommendations for managing C. orbiculare, these include; using certified, disease-free seed and disease tolerant varieties where possible. They also recommend rotating melons with breaks of at least 2–3 seasons with cereals, legumes or brassicas, because the disease stays in the soil for a long time. They suggest destroying any volunteer crops by burying outside of fields and pruning plants to reduce humidity and increase airflow.

== Sources ==
This article incorporates text from a free content work. Licensed under CC-BY-SA (license statement/permission). Text taken from Anthracnose in watermelon, Mooya A.M Nzila, CABI.
