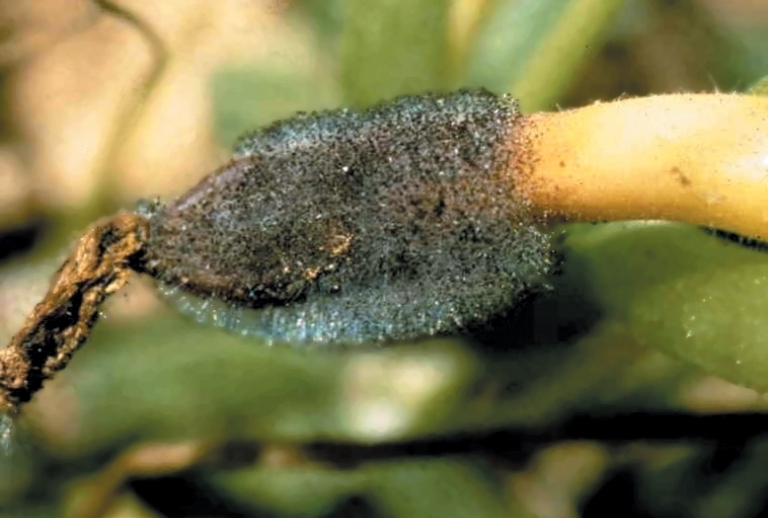

Scientific classification
- Kingdom: Fungi
- Division: Mucoromycota
- Class: Mucoromycetes
- Order: Mucorales
- Family: Choanephoraceae; J.Schröt. (1894)

Type genus
- Choanephora Curr. (1873)

Genera
- Blakeslea; Choanephora; Gilbertella; Poitrasia

Synonyms
- Gilbertellaceae Benny (1991)

= Choanephoraceae =

Family of fungi

The Choanephoraceae are a family of fungi in the order Mucorales. Members of this family are found mostly in the tropics or subtropics, and only rarely in temperate zones. The family currently includes species formerly classified in the family Gilbertellaceae.

== Description ==
In this family, the sporangia and sporangiola arise from separate and distinct sporangiophores. Zygospores are striate, and borne on apposed or tongue-like suspensors.
