= List of Didymella species =

This is a list of the fungus species in the genus Didymella. Many are plant pathogens. Ascochyta is an anamorph for many species placed in Didymella (the teleomorph) but both names refer to the same organism. As of 24 July 2023, the GBIF lists up to 317 species, while Species Fungorum lists 295 species.

== A ==
- Didymella abieticola Vain. (1921)
- Didymella acanthophila Speg. (1912)
- Didymella acetosellae (A.L. Sm. & Ramsb.) Qian Chen & L. Cai (2015)
- Didymella adeana Rehm (1912)
- Didymella adonidis Moesz (1909)
- Didymella aegaea Petr. (1953)
- Didymella aeria Qian Chen, Crous & L. Cai (2017)
- Didymella aerospora Punith. (1981)
- Didymella agrostidis Dearn. & House (1921)
- Didymella alectorolophi Rehm (1923)
- Didymella alhagi Szembel (1924)
- Didymella aliena (Fr.) Qian Chen & L. Cai (2015)
- Didymella aloeicola L.W. Hou, L. Cai & Crous (2020)
- Didymella altajensis Petr. (1928)
- Didymella alyssi Hollós (1907)
- Didymella americana (Morgan-Jones & J.F. White) Qian Chen & L. Cai (2015)
- Didymella annulata Laurila (1939)
- Didymella anserina (Marchal) Qian Chen & L. Cai (2015)
- Didymella antarctica Spooner (1980)
- Didymella apiahyna Speg. (1918)
- Didymella apiculata Feltgen (1903)
- Didymella aquatica Qian Chen, Crous & L. Cai (2017)
- Didymella arachidicola (Khokhr.) Tomilin (1979)
- Didymella araucariae Voglino (1933)
- Didymella atomariella (Nyl.) H. Magn. (1937)
- Didymella aurantiiphila Speg. (1921)
- Didymella aurea (Gruyter, Noordel. & Boerema) Qian Chen & L. Cai (2015)
- Didymella austriaca Petr. (1940)
- Didymella autumnalis Petr. (1925)
- Didymella avicenniae S.D. Patil & Borse (1985)
- Didymella azollae E. Shams, F. Dehghanizadeh, A. Pordel & M. Javan-Nikkhah (2021)

== B ==
- Didymella bellidis (Neerg.) Qian Chen & L. Cai (2015)
- Didymella blumenaviensis Rehm (1901)
- Didymella brevipilosa Magaña-Dueñas, Stchigel & Cano-Lira (2021)
- Didymella brunneospora Valenz.-Lopez, Cano, Crous, Guarro & Stchigel (2017)

== C ==
- Didymella cadubriae (Sacc.) Sacc. (1882)
- Didymella calligoni Frolov (1970)
- Didymella callithrix (Norman) H. Magn. (1937)
- Didymella camporesii Manawasinghe & K.D. Hyde (2020)
- Didymella capparis A. Pande & V.G. Rao (1989)
- Didymella carduicola (Cooke) Sacc. (1882)
- Didymella cari Armstrong-Cho, Banniza & Crous (2018)
- Didymella caricae Tassi (1900)
- Didymella caricis Syd. & P. Syd. (1921)
- Didymella castaneae (Tognini) Bubák (1905)
- Didymella castanella (Cooke & Ellis) Sacc. (1882)
- Didymella castillejae Wehm. (1946)
- Didymella catalpae Hollós (1907)
- Didymella caulicola (Moug.) Sacc. (1882)
- Didymella cerastii Gucevič (1967)
- Didymella chenopodii (P. Karst. & Har.) Qian Chen & L. Cai (2015)
- Didymella chlamydospora Kallol Das, S.Y. Lee & H.Y. Jung (2020)
- Didymella chloroguttulata Qian Chen, Crous & L. Cai (2017)
- Didymella chromolaenae Mapook & K.D. Hyde (2020)
- Didymella cirsii Mapook, Camporesi & K.D. Hyde (2015)
- Didymella citri F. Noack (1899)
- Didymella clibadii F. Stevens (1931)
- Didymella cocconiae Racib. (1909)
- Didymella cocoicola Bat. & A.F. Vital (1955)
- Didymella cocos Weedon (1926)
- Didymella coffeae-arabicae (Aveskamp, Verkley & Gruyter) Qian Chen & L. Cai (2015)
- Didymella coffeicola Speg. (1922)
- Didymella combreti (Crous) L.W. Hou, L. Cai & Crous (2020)
- Didymella commanipula (Berk. & Broome) Sacc. (1882)
- Didymella conchae Bonar (1936)
- Didymella confertissima Sacc. (1902)
- Didymella conigena Höhn. (1929)
- Didymella coriariae Speg. (1910)
- Didymella cortaderiae Grove (1922)
- Didymella cortitecta (Norman) H. Magn. (1937)
- Didymella corylicola Voglmayr, Scarpari, Di Giambattista, Vitale & Luongo (2020)
- Didymella cousiniae Petr. (1949)
- Didymella cretica Petr. (1943)
- Didymella cucurbitacearum A.J. Roy (1968)
- Didymella culmigena (Sacc.) Sacc. (1882)
- Didymella curassavicae Gonz. Frag. & Cif. (1928)
- Didymella curtisii (Berk.) Qian Chen & L. Cai (2015)
- Didymella cylindrospora Vouaux (1910)
- Didymella cymbalariae Feltgen (1903)

== D ==
- Didymella dactylidis (Aveskamp, Gruyter & Verkley) Qian Chen & L. Cai (2015)
- Didymella dactylostemonis Rehm (1901)
- Didymella darluciphila Speg. (1909)
- Didymella degraaffiae Hern.-Restr., L.W. Hou, L. Cai & Crous (2020)
- Didymella delphinii Earle (1905)
- Didymella dentariae Rehm (1923)
- Didymella dimorpha (Aveskamp, Gruyter & Verkley) Qian Chen & L. Cai (2015)
- Didymella dirhyponta (Norman) H. Magn. (1937)
- Didymella distincta (P. Karst.) O.E. Erikss. (1967)
- Didymella dominicana Cif. & Gonz. Frag. (1927)
- Didymella drymeia Höhn. (1917)

== E ==
- Didymella ellipsoidea Qian Chen, Crous & L. Cai (2017)
- Didymella elliptica Starbäck (1905)
- Didymella epilobii (Auersw.) Sacc. (1882)
- Didymella epimelanostola Øvstedal & D. Hawksw. (1986)
- Didymella ericina (Tubeuf) Rehm (1907)
- Didymella eriobotryae Thambug. & K.D. Hyde (2018)
- Didymella erumpens (Cooke) Hansf. (1956)
- Didymella eryngii Moesz (1909)
- Didymella eupatorii F. Stevens (1927)
- Didymella euphoriae Naito (1952)
- Didymella eupyrena Sacc. (1880)
- Didymella eurotiae Fairm. (1918)
- Didymella eutypoides Rehm (1916)
- Didymella exigua (Niessl) Sacc. (1882)

== F ==
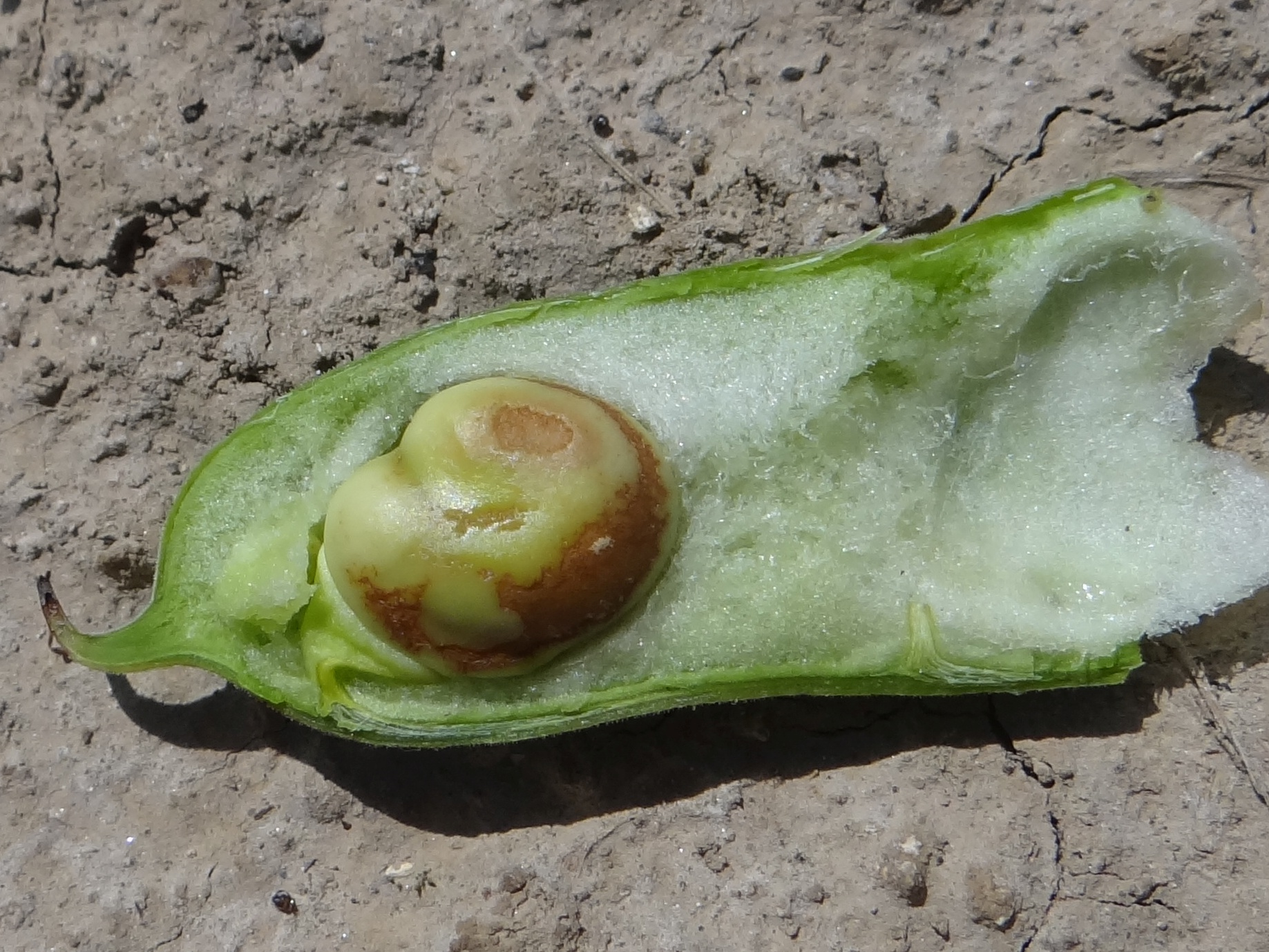
Didymella fabae on Vicia faba

- Didymella fabae G.J. Jellis & Punith. (1991)
- Didymella fagi C.Z. Wei & Y. Harada (1998)
- Didymella festucae (H. Wegelin) L. Holm (1953)
- Didymella finnmarkica Crous & Rämä (2019)
- Didymella fructicola (Naumov) Sacc. (1928)
- Didymella fruticosae Höhn. (1907)
- Didymella fucicola (G.K. Sutherl.) Kohlm. (1968)
- Didymella fusispora McAlpine (1902)

== G ==
- Didymella gardeniae (S. Chandra & Tandon) Qian Chen & L. Cai (2015)
- Didymella gigantea Räsänen (1949)
- Didymella glacialis Rehm (1882)
- Didymella globularis (Körb.) H. Magn. (1937)
- Didymella gloiopeltidis (Miyabe & Tokida) Kohlm. & E. Kohlm. (1979)
- Didymella glomerata (Corda) Qian Chen & L. Cai (2015)
- Didymella glumicola Speg. (1908)
- Didymella goyazensis Sacc., Syd. & P. Syd. (1904)
- Didymella guinetii (Müll. Arg.) Keissl. (1930)
- Didymella guttulata L.W. Hou, L. Cai & Crous (2020)

== H ==
- Didymella hebridensis Dennis (1975)
- Didymella hellebori (Chaillet ex Fr.) Sacc. (1882)
- Didymella hepaticarum (Sacc.) E. Müll. (1962)
- Didymella herculis Maire & Werner (1938)
- Didymella heteroderae (Sen Y. Chen, D.W. Dicks. & Kimbr.) Qian Chen & L. Cai (2015)
- Didymella heveana Saccas (1953)
- Didymella hierochloes Petr. (1947)
- Didymella holci (Tehon) Arx (1987)
- Didymella holosteae Syd. & P. Syd. (1924)
- Didymella hyoscyami Syd. (1942)
- Didymella hyphenis (Cooke) Sacc. (1881)
- Didymella hyporrhodia Sacc. (1881)

== I ==
- Didymella ilicicola Qian Chen, Crous & L. Cai (2017)
- Didymella ilicis P. Larsen (1952)
- Didymella immunda Mouton (1900)
- Didymella inaequalis Corbaz (1957)
- Didymella inconspicua Johanson (1884)
- Didymella indica L.W. Hou, L. Cai & Crous (2020)
- Didymella infuscatispora Qian Chen, Crous & L. Cai (2017)
- Didymella involucralis (Pass.) Sacc. (1913)
- Didymella iranica Petr. (1942)
- Didymella irmgardiae Petr. (1972)

== J ==
- Didymella jaffuelii Speg. (1921)

== K ==
- Didymella kariana Sacc. (1914)
- Didymella keratinophila Valenz.-Lopez, Cano, J. Guarro & Stchigel (2017)
- Didymella kooimaniorum Hern.-Restr., L.W. Hou, L. Cai & Crous (2020)
- Didymella kraunhiae Gonz. Frag. (1924)

== L ==
- Didymella lathyri-verni Sandu (1964)
- Didymella latvica Kirschst. (1935)
- Didymella leguminosarum Petr. (1927)
- Didymella lenormandii Henssen (1963)
- Didymella lentis W.J. Kaiser, B.C. Wang & J.D. Rogers (1997)
- Didymella leonuri Syd. (1934)
- Didymella lithospermi (Ellis & Everh.) Tomilin (1979)
- Didymella longicolla (Aveskamp, Gruyter & Verkley) Qian Chen & L. Cai (2015)
- Didymella lophospora (Sacc. & Speg.) Sacc. (1882)
- Didymella lussoniensis Sacc. (1914)
- Didymella lycopersici Kleb. (1921)

== M ==
- Didymella macrophylla Qian Chen, Crous & L. Cai (2017)
- Didymella macropodii Petr. (1928)
- Didymella macrospora Corbaz (1957)
- Didymella macrostoma (Mont.) Qian Chen & L. Cai (2015)
- Didymella maderensis Petr. (1928)
- Didymella magnei Feldmann (1958)
- Didymella magnoliae A.C. Santos & Sousa da Câmara (1954)
- Didymella mangiferae Bat. (1952)
- Didymella manitobensis Dearn. & Bisby (1929)
- Didymella maroccana Rieuf (1962)
- Didymella maxillariae Speg. (1909)
- Didymella maydis (Arny & R.R. Nelson) Qian Chen & L. Cai (2015)
- Didymella melaleucae Sivan. & R.G. Shivas (2002)
- Didymella menispermacearum Gonz. Frag. ex Trotter (1928)
- Didymella mesnieriana (Rehm & Thüm.) Sacc. (1882)
- Didymella michaelii Bedlan (2016)
- Didymella microchlamydospora (Aveskamp & Verkley) Qian Chen & L. Cai (2015)
- Didymella microspora Vain. (1923)
- Didymella migra Corbaz (1957)
- Didymella minuta M.L. Farr (1961)
- Didymella mitis L.W. Hou, L. Cai & Crous (2020)
- Didymella modesta Mouton (1900)
- Didymella molleriana (G. Winter) Qian Chen & L. Cai (2015)
- Didymella montivaga Bubák (1915)
- Didymella moravica (Petr.) Petr. (1923)
- Didymella mori Hara (1917)
- Didymella muelleri T.S. Viswan. (1960)
- Didymella muhavurensis Hansf. (1947)
- Didymella musae (P. Joly) Qian Chen & L. Cai (2015)
- Didymella mutisiana Unamuno (1932)
- Didymella mycopappi (A. Funk & Dorworth) Crous (1998)

== N ==
- Didymella negriana (Thüm.) Qian Chen & L. Cai (2015)
- Didymella nigra Corbaz (1957)
- Didymella nigrella (Fr.) Sacc. (1883)
- Didymella nigrescens Dearn. & Fairm. (1918)
- Didymella nigricans (P.R. Johnst. & Boerema) Qian Chen & L. Cai (2015)
- Didymella nucis-hicoriae Fairm. (1921)

== O ==
- Didymella obscura Rehm (1910)
- Didymella obstruens Corbaz (1957)
- Didymella ocimicola Qian Chen, Crous & L. Cai (2017)
- Didymella oligospora Sacc. (1921)
- Didymella omphaleae Petr. & Cif. (1932)
- Didymella operosa (Desm.) Sacc. (1882)
- Didymella orchnodes Rehm (1916)
- Didymella oxyspora (Davis) Shoemaker & C.E. Babc. (1989)

== P ==
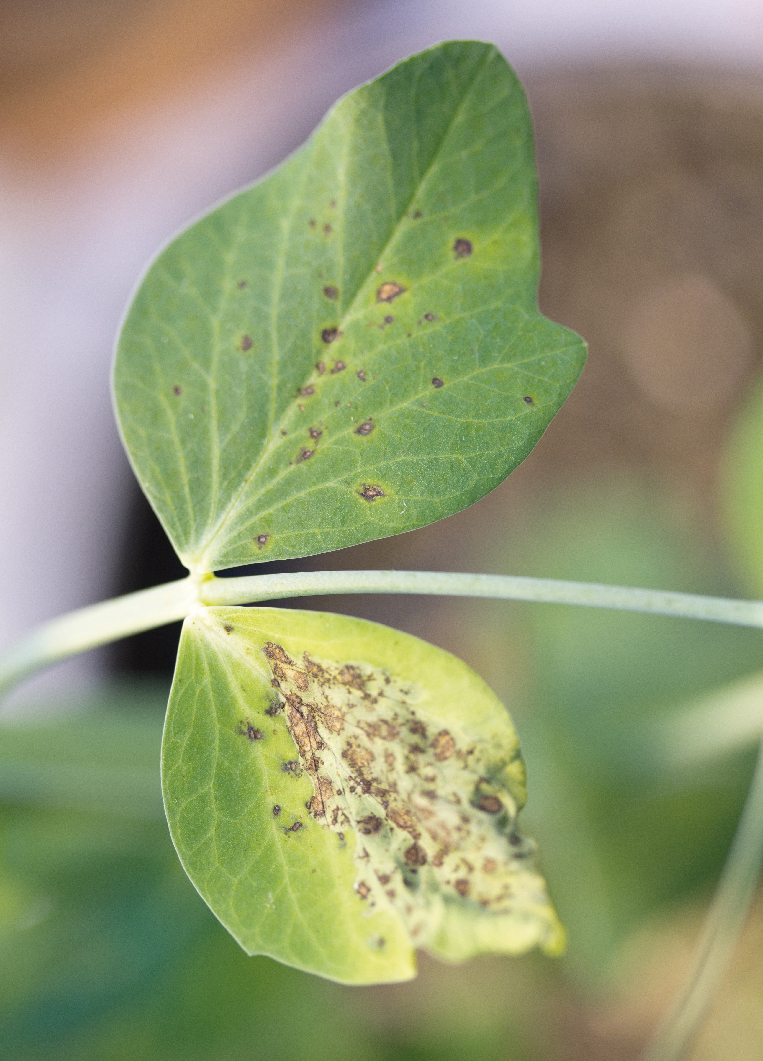
Necrotic lesions caused by Didymella pinodes (formerly Peyronellaea pinodes) on field pea leaves

- Didymella pachyspora Sacc., E. Bommer & M. Rousseau (1890)
- Didymella pallida Starbäck (1904)
- Didymella pandani Höhn. (1920)
- Didymella panici (F. Stevens) M.E. Barr (1992)
- Didymella parvispora Henssen (1977)
- Didymella passiflorae Höhn. (1907)
- Didymella patagonulae Tassi (1900)
- Didymella pedeiae (Aveskamp, Gruyter & Verkley) Qian Chen & L. Cai (2015)
- Didymella pedemontana Ferraris & Sacc. (1902)
- Didymella pedicularis Arx (1950)
- Didymella penniseti Syd. & P. Syd. (1914)
- Didymella phleina Punith. & Årsvoll (1979)
- Didymella pinicola (Hepp) Vain. (1921)
- Didymella pinodella (L.K. Jones) Qian Chen & L. Cai (2015)
- Didymella pinodes (Berk. & A. Bloxam) Petr. (1924)
- Didymella pisi Chilvers, J.D. Rogers & Peever (2009)
- Didymella planiuscula Sacc. (1882)
- Didymella pleosporae Petr. (1947)
- Didymella poaceicola Thambug. & K.D. Hyde (2017)
- Didymella pomorum (Thüm.) Qian Chen & L. Cai (2015)
- Didymella praestabilis Rehm (1904)
- Didymella prolaticolla L.W. Hou, L. Cai & Crous (2020)
- Didymella prominula (Speg.) Piroz. & Morgan-Jones (1968)
- Didymella prosopidis (Crous & A.R. Wood) L.W. Hou, L. Cai & Crous (2020)
- Didymella protuberans (Lév.) Qian Chen & L. Cai (2015)
- Didymella proximella (P. Karst.) Sacc. (1882)
- Didymella pseudosasae I. Hino & Katum. (1960)
- Didymella pteridis L.W. Hou, Crous & L. Cai (2017)
- Didymella purpurea Lambotte & Fautrey (1896)

== Q ==
- Didymella quercina Petr. (1914)
- Didymella quercus Oudem. (1903)

== R ==
- Didymella ramonae Fairm. (1923)
- Didymella rehmii J. Kunze ex Sacc. (1882)
- Didymella rhei Qian Chen & L. Cai (2015)
- Didymella rhododendri S. Ahmad (1972)
- Didymella rhypontella (Nyl.) Szatala (1938)
- Didymella rosea T.L. Pearce, J.B. Scott, Crous, S.J. Pethybr. & F.S. Hay (2016)
- Didymella rubitingens A. Bloxam ex Cooke (1892)
- Didymella rumicicola (Boerema & Loer.) Qian Chen & L. Cai (2015)
- Didymella rupicola Petr. (1940)
- Didymella ruttneri Petr. (1955)

== S ==
- Didymella sachalinensis Sacc. (1908)
- Didymella salicis Grove ex Sacc. (1886)
- Didymella sambucina Feltgen (1903)
- Didymella sancta (Aveskamp, Gruyter & Verkley) Qian Chen & L. Cai (2015)
- Didymella sapotae Chuan F. Zhang & P.K. Chi (1994)
- Didymella scotica Dennis (1971)
- Didymella segeticola (Qian Chen) Qian Chen, Crous & L. Cai (2017)
- Didymella sehimatis Somani & Wangikar (1977)
- Didymella senecionicola Qian Chen & L. Cai (2015)
- Didymella senegalensis Speg. (1914)
- Didymella seriata Rehm (1916)
- Didymella sidae-hermaphroditae Bedlan (2016)
- Didymella sinensis Qian Chen, Crous & L. Cai (2017)
- Didymella sisymbrii (Rehm) Höhn. (1919)
- Didymella smilacina Bat. & Peres (1967)
- Didymella smyrnii Gonz. Frag. (1925)
- Didymella solani (Ellis & Everh.) W. Gams & Gerlach (1968)
- Didymella solheimii Petr. (1978)
- Didymella sorghina Saccas (1954)
- Didymella stenocarpi Tassi (1900)
- Didymella stromatica M.E. Barr & Rogerson (1983)
- Didymella subalpina Rehm (1902)
- Didymella subglobispora L.W. Hou, L. Cai & Crous (2020)
- Didymella subherbarum (Gruyter, Noordel. & Boerema) Qian Chen & L. Cai (2015)
- Didymella subrosea L.W. Hou, L. Cai & Crous (2020)
- Didymella suiyangensis Qian Chen, Crous & L. Cai (2017)
- Didymella syriaca Petr. (1947)

== T ==
- Didymella tabebuiicola W.A.S. Vieira, I.G. Duarte, A.G.G. Amaral, A.F. Lima & M.P.S. Câmara (2021)
- Didymella taxi Oudem. (1898)
- Didymella tenuispora I. Hino & Katum. (1960)
- Didymella thirumalachari Gandhe (2008)
- Didymella trifolii Sacc. (1882)
- Didymella tupae Speg. (1910)

== U ==
- Didymella ulicis Siemaszko (1923)
- Didymella urticicola Aa & Boerema (1976)

== V ==
- Didymella valerianae Corbaz (1957)
- Didymella variabilis L.W. Hou, L. Cai & Crous (2020)
- Didymella veronicicola Kirschst. (1935)
- Didymella viburnicola (Oudem.) Qian Chen & L. Cai (2015)
- Didymella viridimontana M.E. Barr (1992)
- Didymella vitalbina Petr. (1940)
- Didymella vlachii Bubák (1915)

== W ==
- Didymella winteriana (Sacc.) Petr. ex E. Müll. & Arx (1962)

== Z ==
- Didymella zeae-maydis (Mukunya & Boothr.) Arx (1987)
- Didymella zuluensis Doidge (1948)
