= Ascochyta diseases of pea =

Group of diseases affecting pea plants

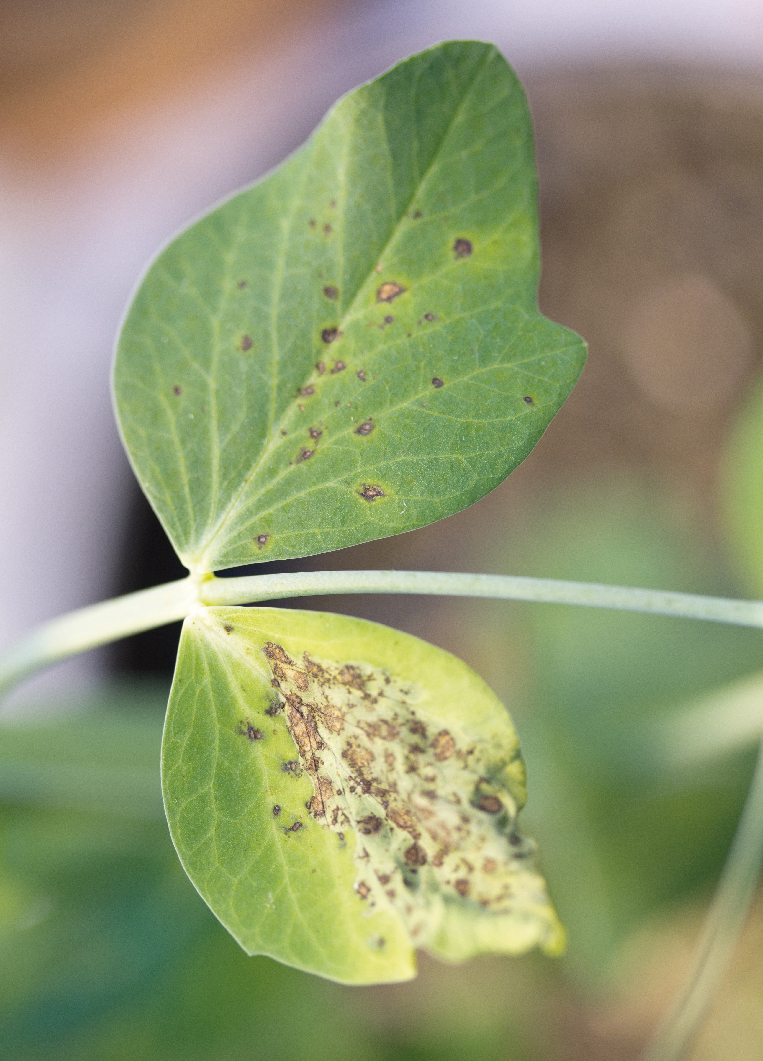
- Necrotic lesions caused by Ascochyta pinodes on field pea leaves
- Common names: ascochyta diseases of pea, ascochyta blights, Mycosphaerella blight, Ascochyta foot rot, Ascochyta blight and pod spot
- Causal agents: Ascochyta pinodes, Ascochyta pinodella, and Ascochyta pisi
- Hosts: Pisum sativum
- EPPO Code: MYCOPI
- Second EPPO code: PHOMMP
- Treatment: sanitation, crop-rotation, altering the sowing date, chemical control, biological control, and development of resistant varieties

Ascochyta blights occur throughout the world and can be of significant economic importance. Three fungi contribute to the ascochyta blight disease complex of pea (Pisum sativum). Ascochyta pinodes (sexual stage: Mycosphaerella pinodes) causes Mycosphaerella blight. Ascochyta pinodella (synonym: Phoma medicaginis var. pinodella) causes Ascochyta foot rot, and Ascochyta pisi causes Ascochyta blight and pod spot. Of the three fungi, Ascochyta pinodes is of the most importance. These diseases are conducive under wet and humid conditions and can cause a yield loss of up to fifty percent if left uncontrolled. The best method to control ascochyta blights of pea is to reduce the amount of primary inoculum through sanitation, crop-rotation, and altering the sowing date. Other methods—chemical control, biological control, and development of resistant varieties—may also be used to effectively control ascochyta diseases.

== Host and symptoms ==
The ascochyta blight disease complex affects field peas (Pisum sativum), as well as many other legumes such as chick peas, lentils, and faba beans. Although three different pathogens cause ascochyta diseases of pea, the symptoms are relatively similar to one another, thus making diagnosis difficult. However, there are some small differences between the fungal pathogens.

=== Mycosphaerella blight (M. pinodes) ===
Ascospores of M. pinodes produce leaf infections that can be identified by many small purple spots on the undersides of leaves. Under dry conditions, these spots remain small and have no well-defined margin. However, under moist conditions, the purple spots enlarge, turning into well-defined, brown- black lesions. Sometimes these lesions will enlarge and coalesce together forming a completely blighted leaf. The infected leaf will die but will still remain attached to the plant. From the attachment point of infected leaves, purplish-brown stem lesions are produced. These lesions extend upward and downward from the point of attachment. Over time, these lesions become increasingly longer and oftentimes coalesce with to completely girdle the stems of the plant. This gives the lower half of the plant a blue-black appearance. When M. pinodes infects the blossoms, small, pinpoint lesions appear on the flowers causing the blossom or small pod to drop. This greatly affects the number of surviving pods and limits seed production. M. pinodes infected seeds might not show symptoms, but if symptoms are present, the seeds may appear shrunken and have a dark-brown discoloration. Planting of infected seeds may result in seedlings with foot rot. Severe infection may kill or stunt young plants and in mature plants, it is likely to cause senescence of all lower leaves and blackening of the stems at the base of the plants.

=== Ascochyta foot rot (P. pinodella) ===
The symptoms of P. pinodella are very similar to those caused by M. pinodes, but less severe. P. pinodella tends to cause less damage to the leaves, stems, and pods. In contrast, the foot rot is usually more severe, oftentimes infecting the stem at the soil line and extending below ground, causing the lateral roots to die.

=== Ascochyta blight and pod spot (A. pisi) ===
A. pisi can be identified by slightly sunken, tan-colored lesions that are defined by dark-brown margins. Lesions on leaves and pods are circular in shape, while lesions are elongated on stems. Oftentimes, small black pycnidia are present. A. pisi rarely attacks the base of the plant or causes foot rot in comparison to M. pinodes and P. pinodella.

== Diagnosis ==
Certain techniques can be used to determine which pathogen is causing disease. One standard technique for distinguishing strains is microscopy. Under a microscope, M. pinodes can be diagnosed by the presence of pseudothecia. P pinodella can be diagnosed by the size of conidia produced. P. pinodella produces conidia that are smaller than the conidia of M. pinodes or A. pisi. A. pisi can be diagnosed by the color of the conidia. In comparison to the light colored, buff spore masses of M. pinodes and P. pinodella produced on oatmeal agar, A. pisi spores masses are carrot red.

Other techniques for diagnosis involve serological assays, isoenzyme analysis, restriction fragment length polymorphisms (RFLPs), random amplified polymorphic DNA (RAPD) assays, and by using monoclonal antibodies.

== Disease cycle ==
Ascochyta blight of pea is caused by Ascomycete fungi. This fungus has an anamorphic (asexual) stage and a teleomorphic (sexual) stage. Ascochyta fungal pathogens are heterothallic, meaning they require two compatible hyphae strains to form their sexual stage. Pycnidia of Ascochyta spp. can overwinter in soil, seeds, or infected plant debris. They release pycnidiospores that come into contact with host tissue and germinate- as the primary inoculum- penetrating through stomatal openings in the Spring. Lesions soon become visible on the leaves. Next, the fungal hyphae grows and produces pear-shaped pycnidia, eventually releasing pycnidiospores that can reinfect plants or seeds via rain splashes- these are considered the secondary inoculum. Compatible hyphae may also fuse to form dikaryotic mycelium, that produce asci-bearing pseudothecia. These can also overwinter in infected plant debris and release their ascospores in the spring to infect new hosts as primary inoculum via wind. The presence of two mating types contributes to genetic variation via recombination. This has helped the pathogen to create outbreaks in previously resistant varieties of plants. Usually, Ascochyta species are host specific: A. fabae, A. lentis, A. pisi, and A. viciae-villosae infect the faba bean, lentil, pea, and hairy vetch respectively. That is, each species only causes symptoms on their respective hosts and not on another.

== Environment ==
Areas where rainfall and/or high humidity occur during the growing season are most conducive to the success of Ascochyta blight. When the crop canopy closes, the infection often intensifies due to the dense growth that prevents dry air from entering the canopy. Incidentally, the disease symptoms are often most prevalent at the base of the plant initially and spread up the plant with time. Ascochyta blight is most prevalent in latitudes ranging from 26˚ N to 45˚ N. Tropical conditions limit disease development. Conditions In the 26˚ N - 45˚ N latitudinal range favor this disease due to the moderate temperature, high humidity, and wet plant surface resulting from dew or rain. Ascochyta fungi grow most rapidly at 20 °C or less, anything above 20 °C begins to limit growth. The sexual ascospores can be carried long distances by wind, reducing the effectiveness of crop rotation as a defense against Ascochyta blight. The asexual conidia travel short distances to new hosts via water splashes from rain.

== Management ==
1. Crop rotation: Since infection may arise from the soil or from pea residues up to three years, an effective approach to reduce the risk of infection is to not plant pea crops in the same field more than once every three or four years. It is also beneficial to change the field location of planting peas every year as well as to plant them as far away as possible. This will control a variety of diseases such as blighting.
2. Stubble management: Zero to minimal tillage does not appear to foster infection. However, stubble management practices such as straw-chopping during combining or harrowing to spread pea residue on the soil surface can speed up decomposition of the residue, which in turn can help reduce the risk of spreading disease.
3. Variety selection: Resistant cultivars to A. pinodes blight have been developed with fair resistance to lodging of stems due to lesions, which result in less yield loss. Planting semi-leafless varieties can help to reduce humidity, which therefore can hinder infection.
4. Agronomics: When pea seeds are planted in the spring, yields tend to be higher. If seeds are planted too deep in the soil or when it is cold, yield losses tend increase as seeds are more susceptible to soil- and seed-borne diseases. Practices that keep crops upright along with selecting ones with a good “lodging rating” can reduce the spread of disease, such as Ascochyta. Avoidance of fields with excess nitrogen also helps reduce lodging pea plants.
5. Seed quality: Determining seed quality at an accredited lab for germination and disease levels can improve yields. Seeds are plated out on a growth medium to determine the percentage that is infected with the fungus. Less than 10% is recommended. However, seeds benefit from fungicide treatment since environmental conditions that are favorable to the pathogen, among other factors, can easily increase infection.
6. Seed treatments: There are several seed treatment products that provide protection against seed-borne Ascochyta on pea: Apron Maxx RTA® and Vitaflo 280®.
7. Scouting and foliar fungicides: It is important to scout for early symptoms and the progression of the disease with respect to its growth stages to determine the amount of fungicides, if any, that should be applied to the infected plant. If, at the flowering stage, symptoms do spread below the lower third of the plant canopy, then the risk of yield loss is low and fungicide treatment is unnecessary. Fungicides are warranted when a combination of half of the lower third of the plant canopy is infected and is spreading to the middle, the weather forecast is rainy and humid, and a high yield would justify the fungicide cost. Despite fungicide application having benefits or not to the yield of crops, some may choose to do so to at least protect the seed quality. Some types of non-systemic, protectant fungicides to control Ascochyta blight of field pea are Bravo 500®, Headline EC®, Lance®, and Quadris®. It is ideal to apply it at the stage of early flower.

== Importance ==
Mycosphaerella blight is the most prevalent Ascochyta disease, which is found in all pea growing regions such as Ireland, United States, Morocco, Iran, Argentina, Australia, and Spain. The average yield loss in an infected pea crop can range from 10%-50% depending on environmental conditions that may either promote or hinder the disease.

== See also ==
- List of Ascochyta species
