= List of mint diseases =

This article is a list of diseases of mint (Mentha piperita, M. cardiaca, M. spicata and M. arvensis).

== Fungal diseases ==
Fungal diseases
Anthracnose	Sphaceloma menthae
Black stem rot	Phoma strasseri
Leaf blight	Cephalosporium sp.
Phoma leaf spot	Phoma exigua
Powdery mildew	Erysiphe spp. Erysiphe cichoracearum
Ramularia leaf spot	Ramularia menthicola
Rust	Puccinia menthae Puccinia angustata
Septoria leaf spot	Septoria menthae
Stem and stolon canker	Rhizoctonia solani Thanatephorus cucumeris[teleomorph]
Stolon decay	Fusarium solani Nectria haematococca [teleomorph]
Verticillium wilt	Verticillium albo-atrum Verticillium albo-atrum var. menthae Verticillium dahliae
White mold stem rot	Sclerotinia sclerotiorum

== Nematodes, parasitic ==
Nematodes, parasitic
Leaf & bud	Aphelenchoides parietinus
Lesion	Pratylenchus neglectus Pratylenchus penetrans
Needle	Longidorus elongatus Longidorus sylphus
Pin	Paratylenchus hamatus Paratylenchus microdorus = Paratylenchus macrophallus
Root-knot	Meloidogyne hapla

== Viral diseases ==
Viral diseases
Spotted wilt	Tomato spotted wilt virus
