= Stagonosporopsis trachelii =

Scientific classification
- Kingdom: Fungi
- Division: Ascomycota
- Class: Dothideomycetes
- Order: Pleosporales
- Family: Didymellaceae
- Genus: Stagonosporopsis
- Species: S. trachelii

Binomial name
- Stagonosporopsis trachelii (Allesch.) Aveskamp et al., (2010)

Synonyms
- Phoma trachelii Allesch., (1895); Ascochyta bohemica Kabát & Bubák, (1905); Stagonospora bohemica (Kabát & Bubák) Tobisch, (1934); Stagonosporopsis bohemica (Kabát & Bubák) Boerema, (1997)

Species of fungus

Stagonosporopsis trachelii (syn. Ascochyta bohemica) is a fungal plant pathogen that causes Ascochyta leaf spot in Campanula species.
