= Phoma narcissi =

Scientific classification
- Kingdom: Fungi
- Division: Ascomycota
- Class: Dothideomycetes
- Order: Pleosporales
- Family: Didymellaceae
- Genus: Phoma
- Species: P. narcissi

Binomial name
- Phoma narcissi (Aderh.) Boerema, Gruyter & Noordel., Persoonia 15(2): 215 (1993

Synonyms
- Phyllosticta narcissi Aderh.; Phyllosticta hymenocallidis Seaver; Hendersonia curtisii Berk

Species of fungus

Phoma narcissi is a fungal plant pathogen of Narcissus, Hippeastrum and other Amaryllidaceae, where it causes a leaf scorch, neck rot and red leaf spot disease

== Taxonomy ==
The USDA's Fungal Database states that P. narcissi may be a synanamorph of Stagonosporopsis curtisii (Peyronellaea curtisii (Berk.) Aveskamp, Gruyter & Verkley).
