= Epicoccum thailandicum =

Scientific classification
- Domain: Eukaryota
- Kingdom: Fungi
- Division: Ascomycota
- Class: Dothideomycetes
- Order: Pleosporales
- Family: Didymellaceae
- Genus: Epicoccum
- Species: E. thailandicum

Binomial name
- Epicoccum thailandicum Goonas., Thambug. & K.D. Hyde (2017)

Species of fungus

Epicoccum thailandicum is a species of fungi first described in Thailand in 2017 living saprobic on grass litter - thus resulting in the specimen name. This is just one of 89 different species of Epicoccum. E. thailandicum is morphologically similar to Epicoccum sorghinum, but the conidial dimensions differ. E. thailandicum has a differing clade in comparison to E. sorghinum, as well making it genetically distinct from this species.

E. thailandicum is a pathogenic fungus infecting Amomum villosum leaves and as a lab contaminate can cause accumulations of pharmacodynamic compounds.
