= Phoma nebulosa =

Scientific classification
- Kingdom: Fungi
- Division: Ascomycota
- Class: Dothideomycetes
- Order: Pleosporales
- Family: Didymellaceae
- Genus: Phoma
- Species: P. nebulosa

Binomial name
- Phoma nebulosa (Pers.) Berk. (1860)

Synonyms
- Mycosphaerella nebulosa (Pers.) Petr. (1925); Mycosphaerella nebulosa (Pers.) Johanson ex Oudem. (1897); Sphaerella nebulosa (Pers.) Sacc. (1880); Sphaeria nebulosa Pers. (1800); Sphaeropsis nebulosa (Pers.) Fr.

Species of fungus

Phoma nebulosa is a fungal plant pathogen infecting spinach.
