= Phoma cucurbitacearum =

Scientific classification
- Kingdom: Fungi
- Division: Ascomycota
- Class: Dothideomycetes
- Order: Pleosporales
- Family: Didymellaceae
- Genus: Phoma
- Species: P. cucurbitacearum

Binomial name
- Phoma cucurbitacearum (Fr.) Sacc. (1884)

Synonyms
- Laestadia cucurbitacearum (Fr.) Sacc. (1883); Sphaerella cucurbitacearum (Fr.) Cooke (1883); Sphaeria cucurbitacearum Fr. (1823)

Species of fungus

Phoma cucurbitacearum is a fungal plant pathogen infecting cucurbits. This pathogen can be primarily found throughout farmlands within the Eastern United States and is known to cause blight in cucurbits. Morphological features of Phoma cucurbitacearum include numerous pycnidia, lack of septate conidia, and sparse ariel mycelium. The fungus can be colonial, and is characterized by dark colored mycelium and small dark fruiting bodies which imbed on lesions. By itself, P. Cucurbitacearum is not as virulent as D. bryoniae, another pathogenic species of fungus responsible for causing blight in cucurbits. Relatively few instances of blight caused by P. Cucurbitacearum have been dated since the 1990's, thus not much research into the long term effects of the blight or treatment regiments have been documented as of 2025.
