= Phoma oncidii-sphacelati =

Scientific classification
- Domain: Eukaryota
- Kingdom: Fungi
- Division: Ascomycota
- Class: Dothideomycetes
- Order: Pleosporales
- Family: Didymellaceae
- Genus: Phoma
- Species: P. oncidii-sphacelati

Binomial name
- Phoma oncidii-sphacelati Tassi (1899)

Species of fungus

Phoma oncidii-sphacelati is a fungal plant pathogen infecting cattleyas.
