= Boeremia linicola =

Scientific classification
- Kingdom: Fungi
- Division: Ascomycota
- Class: Dothideomycetes
- Order: Pleosporales
- Family: Didymellaceae
- Genus: Boeremia
- Species: B. linicola

Binomial name
- Boeremia linicola (Naumov & Vassiljevsky) Jayaward., Jayasiri & K.D.Hyde

Synonyms
- Ascochyta linicola Naumov & Vassiljevsky; Boeremia exigua var. linicola (Naumov & Vassiljevsky) Aveskamp, Gruyter & Verkley; Phoma exigua f.sp. linicola Malc. & E.G.Gray; Phoma exigua var. linicola (Naumov & Vassiljevsky) P.W.T.Maas; Phoma linicola Naumov

Species of fungus

Boeremia linicola is a fungal plant pathogen that affects flax.

The disease is passed on in the seed. The effects are more pronounced after the plant has flowered. Brown discolorations can be seen with small black dots, the pycnidia, where the spores are formed. The disease severely impacts the fiber quality.
