= Phoma insidiosa =

Scientific classification
- Domain: Eukaryota
- Kingdom: Fungi
- Division: Ascomycota
- Class: Dothideomycetes
- Order: Pleosporales
- Family: Didymellaceae
- Genus: Phoma
- Species: P. insidiosa

Binomial name
- Phoma insidiosa Tassi (1898)

Synonyms
- Cytospora curreyi Sacc. (1884); Leucocytospora curreyi (Sacc.) (1942)

Species of fungus

Phoma insidiosa is a plant pathogen infecting wheat.
