= Boeremia foveata =

Scientific classification
- Kingdom: Fungi
- Division: Ascomycota
- Class: Dothideomycetes
- Order: Pleosporales
- Family: Didymellaceae
- Genus: Boeremia
- Species: B. foveata

Binomial name
- Boeremia foveata (Foister) Aveskamp, Gruyter & Verkley

Synonyms
- Phoma exigua var. foveata (Foister) Boerema; Phoma foveata Foister; Phoma solanicola f. foveata (Foister) Malc.; Phoma solanicola var. foveata (Foister) Malc.

Species of fungus

Boeremia foveata is a fungal plant pathogen infecting potatoes.

== Control ==
Although useful as biocontrols in arthropod pests and some other fungal pathogens, neither Beauveria bassiana nor Beauveria brongniartii is an effective biocontrol of Boeremia foveata.
