= P. microspora =

P. microspora can refer to a few different species of fungi. The specific epithet microspora means 'tiny spore.'

- Palmogloea microspora, a green algae in the family Coccomyxaceae
- Paradiplodia microspora, a sac fungus
- Paraphaeosphaeria microspora, a fungus in the family Didymosphaeriaceae
- Parmelia microspora, a lichen in the family Parmeliaceae
- Parmentaria microspora, a lichen in the family Verrucariaceae
- Penzigia microspora, a fungus in the family Xylariaceae
- Perichaena microspora, a slime in the family Trichiidae
- Perrotia microspora, a fungus in the family Hyaloscyphaceae
- Perthida microspora, a moth in the family Incurvariidae
- Pertusaria microspora, a fungus in the family Pertusariaceae
- Pestalotiopsis microspora, a fungus in the family Amphisphaeriaceae that can eat plastic
- Pezicula microspora, a fungus in the family Dermateaceae
- Peziza microspora, a fungus in the family Pezizaceae
- Pezizella microspora, a fungus in the family Hyaloscyphaceae
- Phaeoisaria microspora, a fungus
- Phaeophyscia microspora, a lichen in the family Physciaceae
- Phaeoramularia microspora, a fungus in the family Mycosphaerellaceae
- Phaeosperma microspora, a fungus
- Phakopsora microspora, a fungus in the family Phakopsoraceae
- Pharcidia microspora, a fungus in the family Mycosphaerellaceae
- Phialea microspora, a fungus
- Phialophora microspora, a fungus in the family Herpotrichiellaceae
- Phlebiella microspora, a polypore mushroom
- Phloeospora microspora, a fungus in the family Mycosphaerellaceae
- Pholiota microspora, a choice edible mushroom in the family Strophariaceae
- Pholiotina microspora, a fungus in the family Bolbitiaceae
- Phoma microspora, a pathogenic fungus in the family Didymellaceae
- Phomopsis microspora, a fungus in the family Diaporthaceae
- Phyllachora microspora, a fungus in the family Phyllachoraceae
- Physalospora microspora, a fungus in the family Hyponectriaceae
- Pichia microspora, a yeast in the family Saccharomycetaceae
- Pirottaea microspora, a fungus in the family Dermateaceae
- Pithya microspora, a fungus in the family Sarcoscyphaceae
- Platygloea microspora, a fungus in the family Platygloeaceae
- Platygramme microspora, a fungus in the family Graphidaceae
- Pleospora microspora, a fungus in the family Pleosporaceae
- Pohlia microspora, a moss in the family Bryaceae
- Polygala microspora, a plant in the family Polygalaceae
- Poria microspora, a synonym for Rhodonia placenta, a crust fungus
- Pronectria microspora, a fungus in the family Bionectriaceae
- Protoparmelia microspora, a lichen in the family Parmeliaceae
- Psathyrella microspora, a fungus in the family Coprinaceae
- Pseudobalsamia microspora, a fungus in the family Helvellaceae
- Puccinia microspora, a fungus in the family Pucciniaceae and a pathogen of cereal crops
- Pustularia microspora, a fungus in the family Pyronemataceae
- Pustulina microspora, a fungus in the family Pyronemataceae
- Pyrenochaetopsis microspora, a plant in the family Cucurbitariaceae
- Pyrenula microspora, a fungus in the family Pyrenulaceae
- Pyxidiophora microspora, an arthropod-associated fungus in the family Pyxidiophoraceae
- Pyxine microspora, a lichen in the family Caliciaceae

== See also ==
- Microspora, a genus of green algae
- Psilocybe semilanceata var. microspora, a synonym for Psilocybe strictipes, a psilocybin mushroom
- Panaeolus papilionaceus var. microspora, a synonym for Panaeolus papilionaceus, the petticoat mottlegill mushroom
