= Phoma scabra =

Scientific classification
- Domain: Eukaryota
- Kingdom: Fungi
- Division: Ascomycota
- Class: Dothideomycetes
- Order: Pleosporales
- Family: Didymellaceae
- Genus: Phoma
- Species: P. scabra

Binomial name
- Phoma scabra Sacc. (1881)

Species of fungus

Phoma scabra is a fungal plant pathogen infecting plane trees.
