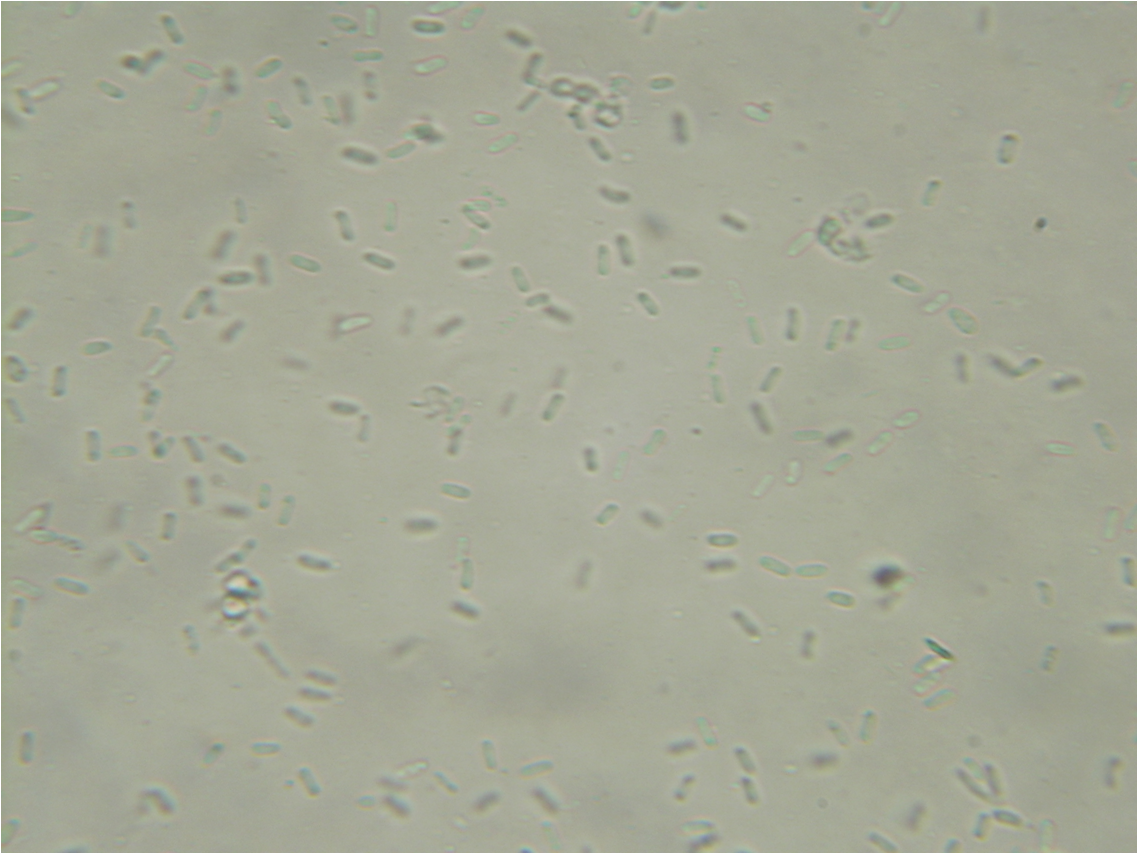
- Phoma exigua spores

Scientific classification
- Kingdom: Fungi
- Division: Ascomycota
- Class: Dothideomycetes
- Order: Pleosporales
- Family: Didymellaceae
- Genus: Phoma (Saccardo, 1880)

Type species
- Phoma herbarum

= Phoma =

Genus of fungi

Phoma is a genus of common coelomycetous soil fungi. It contains many plant pathogenic species.

== Description ==
Spores are colorless and unicellular. The pycnidia are black and depressed in the tissues of the host. Phoma is arbitrarily limited to those species in which the spores are less than 15 μm as the larger spored forms have been placed in the genus Macrophoma. The most important species include Phoma beta which is the cause of the heart rot and blight of beets, Phoma batata that produces a dry rot of sweet potato, and Phoma solani.

== Taxonomy ==
About 140 Phoma taxa have been defined and recognized which may be divided into two large groups: (i) plurivorous fungi, generally saprobic or weakly parasitic, mainly from temperate regions in Eurasia, but occasionally also found in other parts of the world (including areas with cool or warm climates); and (ii) specific pathogens of cultivated plants. However other estimates place the number of taxa closer to 3000, making it one of the largest fungal genera.

Traditionally nine sections (Phoma, Heterospora, Macrospora, Paraphoma, Peyronellaea, Phyllostictoides, Pilosa, Plenodomus and Sclerophomella) as described by Boerema (1997) have been recognised on morphological grounds. The number of taxa in each section varied widely, from 2 (Pilosa) to 70 (Phoma). Section Phoma itself was considered incertae sedis.

However phylogenetic studies suggest the genus is highly polyphyletic containing six distinct clades. Furthermore, taxa identified as Phoma have been identified across several different families within Pleosporales, but most within Didymellaceae (type genus Didymella). Furthermore, the Didymellaceae segregate into 18 clusters allowing many taxa to be distributed into separate genera.

Consequently, there is little justification for retaining the sections, a number of which such as Peyronellaea are now elevated to genus rank, within Didymellaceae.

== Selected species ==
Species include:

- Phoma candelariellae Z.Kocakaya & Halıcı (2016) – lichenicolous on Candelariella aurella
- Phoma caricae-papayae
- Phoma costaricensis
- Phoma cucurbitacearum
- Phoma destructiva
- Phoma draconis
- Phoma eupyrena
- Phoma fuliginosa – lichenicolous on Caloplaca trachyphylla
- Phoma glomerata
- Phoma herbarum
- Phoma insidiosa
- Phoma microspora
- Phoma narcissi
- Phoma nebulosa
- Phoma oncidii-sphacelati
- Phoma scabra
- Phoma sclerotioides
- Phoma strasseri
- Phoma tracheiphila

== Bibliography ==
- Boerema, G. H.; de Gruyter, J.; Noordeloos, M. E.; Hamers, M. E. C. 2004. Phoma Identification Manual: Differentiation of Specific and Infra-specific Taxa in Culture. CABI.
- Aveskamp, M.M.; de Gruyter, J.; Woudenberg, J.H.C.; Verkley, G.J.M.; Crous, P.W. (2010). "Highlights of the Didymellaceae: A polyphasic approach to characterise Phoma and related pleosporalean genera". Studies in Mycology. 65: 1–60. doi:10.3114/sim.2010.65.01. PMC 2836210. PMID 20502538.
- de Gruyter, J.; Woudenberg, J.H.C.; Aveskamp, M.M.; Verkley, G.J.M.; Groenewald, J.Z.; Crous, P.W. (June 2013). "Redisposition of phoma-like anamorphs in Pleosporales". Studies in Mycology. 75 (1): 1–36. doi:10.3114/sim0004. PMC 3713885. PMID 24014897.
