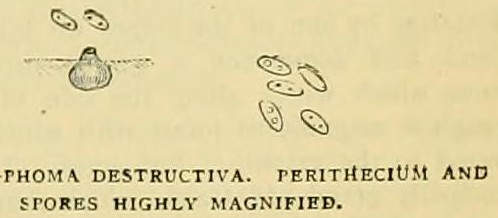
- Perithecium and spores of Phoma destructiva

Scientific classification
- Kingdom: Fungi
- Division: Ascomycota
- Class: Dothideomycetes
- Order: Pleosporales
- Family: Didymellaceae
- Genus: Phoma
- Species: P. destructiva

Binomial name
- Phoma destructiva Plowr. (1881)

Synonyms
- Diplodina destructiva (Plowr.) Petr. (1921)

= Phoma destructiva =

Species of fungus

Phoma destructiva is a fungal plant pathogen infecting tomatoes and potatoes.
