= Verticillium albo-atrum var. menthae =

Scientific classification
- Kingdom: Fungi
- Division: Ascomycota
- Class: Sordariomycetes
- Order: Hypocreales
- Family: incertae sedis
- Genus: Verticillium
- Species: V. albo-atrum
- Variety: V. albo-atrum var. menthae

Trinomial name
- Verticillium albo-atrum var. menthae R. Nelson

Variety of fungus

Verticillium albo-atrum var. menthae is a plant pathogen infecting mint.

== See also ==
- List of mint diseases
