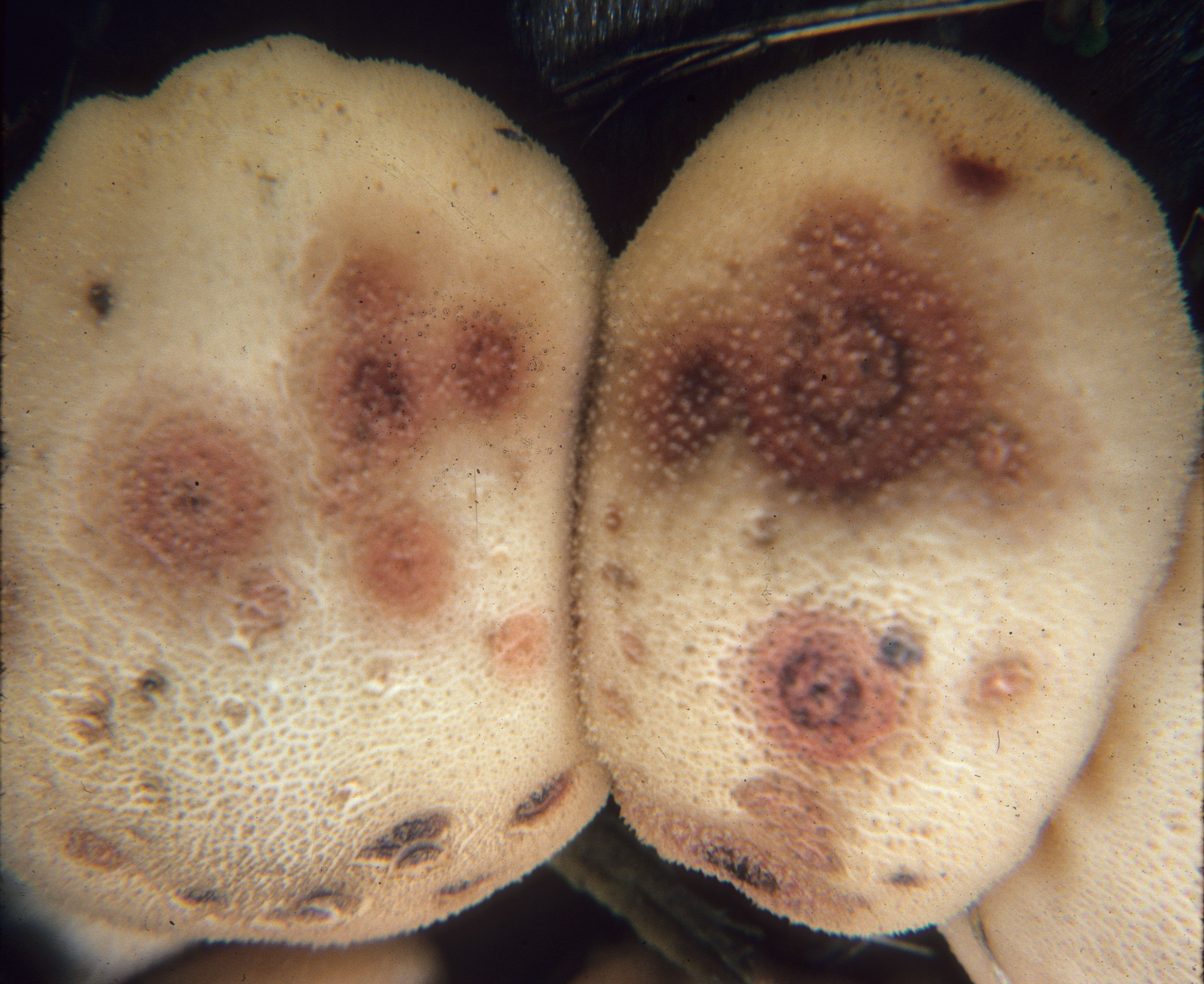
- Epicoccum nigrum

Scientific classification
- Domain: Eukaryota
- Kingdom: Fungi
- Division: Ascomycota
- Class: Dothideomycetes
- Order: Pleosporales
- Family: Didymellaceae
- Genus: Epicoccum; Link, 1816

= Epicoccum =

Genus of fungi

Epicoccum is a genus of fungi belonging to the family Didymellaceae.

The genus has cosmopolitan distribution.

== Species ==
As accepted by Species Fungorum;

- Epicoccum andropogonearum Y.P. Tan & R.G. Shivas (2021)
- Epicoccum andropogonis (Ces.) Schol-Schwarz (1959)
- Epicoccum angulosum Penz. & Sacc. (1902)
- Epicoccum aponogetonicum Pavgi & U.P. Singh (1966)
- Epicoccum asterinum Pat. (1912)
- Epicoccum astragali W. Zhao, Q. Ning & J.Y. Yan (2023)
- Epicoccum brahmanense L.W. Hou, L. Cai & Crous (2020)
- Epicoccum brasiliense (Aveskamp, Gruyter & Verkley) Qian Chen & L. Cai (2015)
- Epicoccum camelliae Qian Chen, Crous & L. Cai (2017)
- Epicoccum catenisporum Valenz.-Lopez, Stchigel, Crous, Guarro & Cano (2017)
- Epicoccum cedri Manawas., Camporesi & K.D. Hyde (2017)
- Epicoccum chloridis Y.P. Tan & R.G. Shivas (2021)
- Epicoccum chrysanthemi du Plessis (1933)
- Epicoccum coniferarum Petr. (1934)
- Epicoccum davidssonii Rostr. (1903)
- Epicoccum deccanense R. Srivast., Kapgate & S. Chatterjee (2009)
- Epicoccum dendrobii Qian Chen, Crous & L. Cai (2017)
- Epicoccum dickmanii L.W. Hou & O. Yarden (2020)
- Epicoccum diversisporum Preuss (1853)
- Epicoccum djirangnandiri E.C. Keirnan, M.H. Laurence, R.G. Shivas & Y.P. Tan (2021)
- Epicoccum draconis (Berk. ex Cooke) Qian Chen & L. Cai (2015)
- Epicoccum duchesneae Qian Chen, Crous & L. Cai (2017)
- Epicoccum effusum Fuckel (1870)
- Epicoccum endophyticum Manwasinghe, X.H. Li & K.D. Hyde (2020)
- Epicoccum equiseti (Berk.) Berk. (1860)
- Epicoccum eucalypti Henn. (1902)
- Epicoccum fructigenum McAlpine (1902)
- Epicoccum granulatum Penz. (1882)
- Epicoccum henanense W. Zhao, Q. Ning & J.Y. Yan (2023)
- Epicoccum henningsii (Sacc.) Qian Chen & L. Cai (2015)
- Epicoccum hordei Qian Chen, Crous & L. Cai (2017)
- Epicoccum huancayense (Turkenst.) Qian Chen & L. Cai (2015)
- Epicoccum humicola (R.E. Buchanan) Sacc. (1931)
- Epicoccum hyalopes I. Miyake (1910)
- Epicoccum italicum Qian Chen, Crous & L. Cai (2017)
- Epicoccum javanicum Koord. (1907)
- Epicoccum keratinophilum Valenz.-Lopez, Cano, Guarro & Stchigel (2017)
- Epicoccum latusicollum Qian Chen, Crous & L. Cai (2017)
- Epicoccum layuense Qian Chen, Crous & L. Cai (2017)
- Epicoccum ligustri Henn. (1902)
- Epicoccum longiostiolatum L.W. Hou, L. Cai & Crous (2020)
- Epicoccum mackenziei Jayasiri, Camporesi & K.D. Hyde (2017)
- Epicoccum magnoliae Tognini (1899)
- Epicoccum majus Rostr. (1904)
- Epicoccum maritimum G.K. Sutherl. (1916)
- Epicoccum mezzettii Goid. (1937)
- Epicoccum microscopicum Henn. (1902)
- Epicoccum mnesitheae Y.P. Tan & R.G. Shivas (2021)
- Epicoccum multiceps L.W. Hou, L. Cai & Crous (2020)
- Epicoccum neglectum Desm. (1842)
- Epicoccum nigrocinnabarinum Höhn. (1920)
- Epicoccum nigrum Link (1816)
- Epicoccum nipponicum Matsush. (1995)
- Epicoccum oryzae S. Ito & Iwadare (1934)
- Epicoccum ovisporum Valenz.-Lopez, Stchigel, Crous, Guarro & Cano (2017)
- Epicoccum padi Rostr. (1904)
- Epicoccum pallescens Berk. (1855)
- Epicoccum pandani Henn. (1902)
- Epicoccum panici Gonz. Frag. (1918)
- Epicoccum phaseoli Sawada (1958)
- Epicoccum phragmosporum M. Raza & L. Cai (2019)
- Epicoccum pimprinum (P.N. Mathur, S.K. Menon & Thirum.) Aveskamp, Gruyter & Verkley (2010)
- Epicoccum plagiochilae Racov. (1944)
- Epicoccum plurivorum (P.R. Johnst.) Qian Chen & L. Cai (2015)
- Epicoccum pneumoniae Valenz.-Lopez, Stchigel, Guarro & Cano (2017)
- Epicoccum poaceicola Thambug. & K.D. Hyde (2017)
- Epicoccum poae Qian Chen, Crous & L. Cai (2017)
- Epicoccum polychromum L.W. Hou, L. Cai & Crous (2020)
- Epicoccum polygonati Henn. & Shirai (1900)
- Epicoccum proteae (Crous) Valenz.-Lopez, Stchigel, Crous, J. Guarro & Cano (2017)
- Epicoccum pruni Manawas., Bulgakov & K.D. Hyde (2017)
- Epicoccum pseudokeratinophilum Chethana, J.Y. Yan, X.H. Li & K.D. Hyde (2019)
- Epicoccum rhynchosporae Y.P. Tan & R.G. Shivas (2021)
- Epicoccum rosae Wanas., Camporesi, E.B.G. Jones & K.D. Hyde (2018)
- Epicoccum sibiricum Lavrov (1948)
- Epicoccum sinense Petr. (1947)
- Epicoccum sorghicola Y.P. Tan & R.G. Shivas (2021)
- Epicoccum sorghinum (Sacc.) Aveskamp, Gruyter & Verkley (2010)
- Epicoccum sphaerioides Corda (1837)
- Epicoccum thailandicum Goonas., Thambug. & K.D. Hyde (2017)
- Epicoccum tobaicum (Svilv.) L.W. Hou, L. Cai & Crous (2020)
- Epicoccum torquens Massee (1906)
- Epicoccum triodiae Y.P. Tan & R.G. Shivas (2021)
- Epicoccum tritici Henn. (1904)
- Epicoccum variabile L.W. Hou, L. Cai & Crous (2020)
- Epicoccum viciae-villosae W. Zhao, Q. Ning & J.Y. Yan (2023)
- Epicoccum viticis Qian Chen, Crous & L. Cai (2017)
- Epicoccum yuccae Săvul. (1943)
- Epicoccum yunnanense Matsush. (1995)

Former species;

- E. agyrioides Corda (1837) = Epicoccum nigrum
- E. agyrium Corda (1837) = Epicoccum nigrum
- E. aleurophilum (Sacc.) Mussat (1901) = Epicoccum nigrum
- E. cocos F. Stevens (1932) = Pseudoepicoccum cocos, Ascomycota
- E. diversisporum f. pseudoplatani Allesch. (1895) = Epicoccum nigrum
- E. diversisporum var. pseudoplatani (Allesch.) Sacc. & Trotter (1913) = Epicoccum nigrum
- E. echinatum Peglion (1895) = Petrakia echinata, Pseudodidymellaceae
- E. granulatum var. microsporum Gonz. Frag. (1923) = Epicoccum granulatum
- E. magnoliae var. verrucosum Bongini (1942) = Epicoccum magnoliae
- E. neglectum f. menispermi Sacc. (1878) = Epicoccum neglectum
- E. nigrum var. agyroides (Corda) Sacc. (1881) = Epicoccum nigrum
- E. pallescens (Rabenh.) Mussat (1901) = Epicoccum nigrum
- E. parmeliarum H. Olivier (1906) = Phoma parmeliarum, Didymellaceae
- E. purpurascens Kunze (1818) = Epicoccum nigrum
- E. purpurascens Ehrenb. ex Schltdl. (1824) = Epicoccum nigrum
- E. purpurascens var. aleurophilum Sacc. (1881) = Epicoccum nigrum
- E. purpurascens var. tabaci Pass. (1881) = Epicoccum nigrum
- E. tabaci (Pass.) Mussat (1901) = Epicoccum nigrum
- E. theobromae Petch (1925) = Apiospora arundinis, Apiosporaceae
- E. usneae Anzi (1868) = Lichenoconium usneae, Lichenoconiaceae
- E. versicolor var. nigrum (Link) Rabenh. (1844) = Epicoccum nigrum
- E. versicolor var. pallescens Rabenh. (1844) = Epicoccum nigrum
- E. versicolor var. purpurascens (Ehrenb. ex Schltdl.) Rabenh. (1844) = Epicoccum nigrum
- E. versicolor var. virescens Rabenh. (1844) = Epicoccum nigrum
- E. virescens (Rabenh.) Mussat (1901) = Epicoccum nigrum
- E. vulgare Corda (1837) = Epicoccum nigrum
- E. vulgare var. pallescens (Rabenh.) Sacc. (1897) = Epicoccum nigrum
- E. vulgare var. virescens (Rabenh.) Sacc. (1897) = Epicoccum nigrum
