= Didymella aliena =

Scientific classification
- Kingdom: Fungi
- Division: Ascomycota
- Class: Dothideomycetes
- Order: Pleosporales
- Family: Didymellaceae
- Genus: Didymella
- Species: D. aliena

Binomial name
- Didymella aliena Fr. (1823)

Synonyms
- Phoma aliena Sphaeria aliena

Species of fungi

Didymella aliena is a species of fungus belonging to the family Didymellaceae, that lives as an opportunistic pathogen on several species of plants worldwide. First described in 1823 by Swedish mycologist and botanist, Elias Magnus Fries, the species has undergone several name changes and been found worldwide.

== Etymology ==
The species was first described as Sphaeria aliena in 1823 by Elias Fries in the Systema mycologicum. In this book several species were named that would eventually undergo several name changes and replacements over the next 200+ years. The species would be revisited once again in Contributions towards a monograph of Phoma where several pathogenic fungi were placed within the Phoma genus based on conidia size. This would include S. aliena due to its conidia being 7 micrometers long. Then one of the same authors published another paper in 2009 called Molecular phylogeny of Phoma and allied anamorph genera where Didymellaceae was divided into three main genera: Phoma, Didymella, and Ascoschyta. Finally, The most up to date name change was published in Resolving the Phoma Enigma where scientist used genetics to find out that the Phoma genus is polyphyletic and placed Phoma aliena into the genus Didymella to become Didymella aliena.

== Distribution ==
There have been several publications of D. aliena being found around the world. A recent study in Tbilisi, Georgia found that D. aliena was found on diseased material in coniferous forests. In a recently published survey of D. aliena, was when it was found in northern Greece 2024 on rotting pomegranates for the first time. According to GlobalFungi D. aliena has also been found on all seven continents.

== Pathology ==
D. aliena is an opportunistic pathogen on several different species of plants. On pomegranate they cause large darkening spots on the fruits. This species is also one of several that cause the disease phomosis in plants.
