= Phoma microspora =

Scientific classification
- Domain: Eukaryota
- Kingdom: Fungi
- Division: Ascomycota
- Class: Dothideomycetes
- Order: Pleosporales
- Family: Didymellaceae
- Genus: Phoma
- Species: P. microspora

Binomial name
- Phoma microspora Pat.

Species of fungus

Phoma microspora is a fungal plant pathogen known for infecting peanuts.
