= Platychora ulmi =

Scientific classification
- Domain: Eukaryota
- Kingdom: Fungi
- Division: Ascomycota
- Class: Dothideomycetes
- Order: Pleosporales
- Family: Venturiaceae
- Genus: Platychora
- Species: P. ulmi

Binomial name
- Platychora ulmi (Schleich.) Petr., (1925)

Synonyms
- Dothidea ulmi (C.-J. Duval) Fr., (1823); Dothidella ulmi (C.-J. Duval) G. Winter, (1886); Euryachora ulmi (Schleich.) J. Schröt., (1897); Phyllachora ulmi (C.-J. Duval) Fuckel, (1870); Polystigma ulmi (C.-J. Duval) Link, (1833); Sphaeria ulmaria Sowerby, (1803); Sphaeria ulmi C.-J. Duval, (1809); Sphaeria ulmi Schleich., (1805); Sphaeria xylomoides DC., (1805); Systremma ulmi (C.-J. Duval) Theiss. & Syd., (1915); Systremma ulmi (Schleich.) Fr., (1915); Xyloma ulmeum Mart., (1817)

Species of fungus

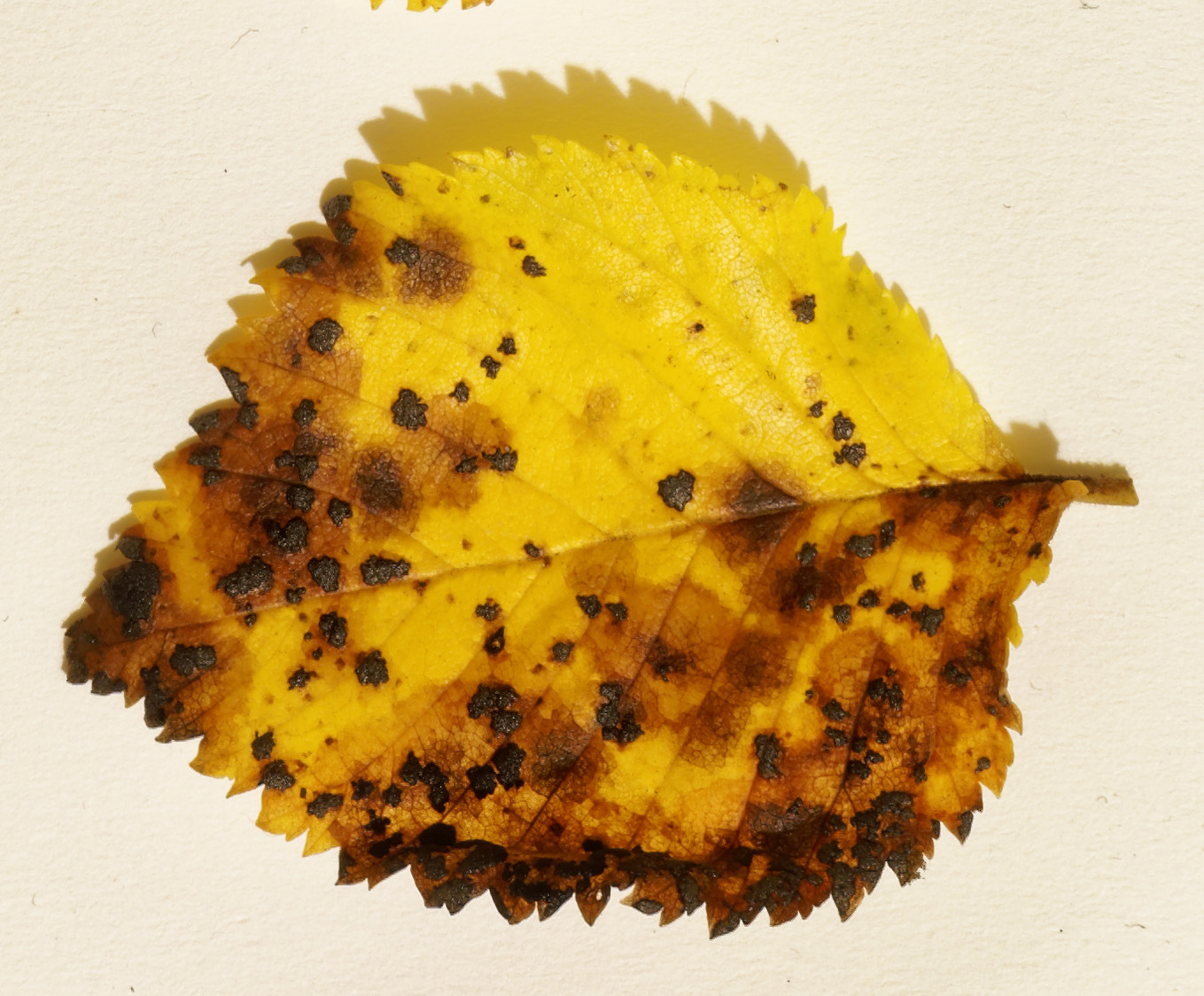
leaf affected by Platychora ulmi

Platychora ulmi is a plant pathogen infecting elms.
