= Epicoccum sorghinum =

Scientific classification
- Kingdom: Fungi
- Division: Ascomycota
- Class: Dothideomycetes
- Order: Pleosporales
- Family: Didymellaceae
- Genus: Epicoccum
- Species: E. sorghinum

Binomial name
- Epicoccum sorghinum (Sacc.) Aveskamp, Gruyter & Verkley

Fungus that causes ring spot and leaf stop disease

Epicoccum sorghinum (former Phoma sorghina) is an ascomycete fungus with known plant pathogenicity to sugarcane and rice, causing ring spot disease and leaf spot disease. This fungus is primarily known for its production of tenuazonic acid, which leads to complications with growth and causes the symptoms of leaf spot disease. Tenuazonic acid not only affects plant growth, but has recently been proven to impact human health due to its prevalence in food and beverages. It is widely dispersed, affecting multiple hosts in different countries. Although not a serious threat, Epicoccum sorghinum has been known to influence the sorghum grain-mold complex in ways which reduce crop yields, seed viability, and kernel weight. As a result of continuous phylogenetic and morphological discoveries relevant to Epicoccum sorghinum, this fungus has undergone a number of name changes.

== Taxonomy ==
Throughout its known existence, Epicoccum sorghinum has possessed many names. Initially, Saccardo isolated the fungus from Sorghum vulgare and named it Phyllosticta sorghina. In 1973, Boerema, Dorenbosch, and Van Kesteren changed its name to Phoma sorghina, which is occasionally still utilized. In 2010, it was again renamed Epicoccum sorghi by Aveskamp and others, due to recent phylogenetic and morphological characteristics. Currently, Epicoccum sorghinum serves as the accepted name for this fungus.

== Disease and hosts ==
A variety of fungal pathogens cause ring spot disease and leaf spot disease. The genus Epicoccum is ubiquitous and contains many species that are plant pathogenic. Epicoccum sorghinum commonly infects sugarcane, but recent discoveries have found that it can also use rice as its host. Epicoccum sorghinum is a fungal contaminant that can be isolated from a variety of cereals in sorghum grains. As a result, it contributes to the pathogenicity of the sorghum gain-mold complex. Less common diseases caused by Epicoccum sorghinum include root rot, dying-off, glume blotch, and glume blight, all of which affect various hosts.

=== Host symptoms ===
Leaf spot disease, the most common symptom of infection from Epicoccum sorghinum, causes small, chlorotic spots with gray/black centers and yellow halos. The spots initially appear at the bottom of the plant and slowly progress upwards. As a result of this weak progression of infection, the lower portion of the plant expresses significant damage while the upper portion may only have a few spots.

=== Tenuazonic acid ===
Tenuazonic acid is a mycotoxin produced by fungal pathogens like Epicoccum sorghinum. Production of this component causes inhibition of protein synthesis which leads to growth disorders of the plant.

=== Human impact ===
Metabolites produced by Epicoccum sorghinum have been known to impact human health, specifically causing erythematous lesions on the skin. This infection is not common and occurs primarily in immunocompromised individuals.

== Distribution and habitat ==
Epicoccum sorghinum is typically found in tropical and subtropical regions of a variety of countries including Brazil, China, France, India, South Africa, Thailand, Turkey, United States, etc. Epicoccum sorghinum has also been known to inhabit temperate regions and grasses (gramineae).

== Characteristics ==
On a medium, Epicoccum sorghinum produces a reddish/brown pigment. Colonies are 5–9 cm and circular in shape. The mycelium of Epicoccum sorghinum is dense and fluffy. The color of mycelium varies and can be gray, green, and salmon colored. Under a microscope, Epicoccum sorghinum produces brown or translucent, subglobose pycnidia with straight necks. Size varies from 67.9 to 117.5 x 44.5 to 90.1 micrometers. Chlamydospores are unicellular or multicellular, botryoid, and brown or translucent. Conidia are unicellular, oval shaped or curved, translucent (hyaline), and 3.6 to 5.3 x 1.8 to 2.8 micrometers.

== Significance ==
Epicoccum sorghinum is currently not a significant threat to rice development, as there are two other fungal diseases of rice that are more common, rice blast and brown leaf spot. However, ring spot disease due to Epicoccum sorghinum on sugarcane has been known to significantly reduce stalk sugar yield. Sorghum is a frequently consumed grain that is negatively affected by toxins of fungi. As a result, disease of this genus can lead to decreased production and consumption which may impact certain countries economically. Environmental factors have been proven to influence the amount of tenuazonic acid produced by Epicoccum sorghinum. Specifically, the production of tenuazonic acid in grains is highest during the summer. Amongst the pathogenic effects of Epicoccum sorghinum, recent studies support ethyl acetate, a biologically active compound from E. sorghinum, as an antiplatelet aggregation and anti-inflammatory agent.
