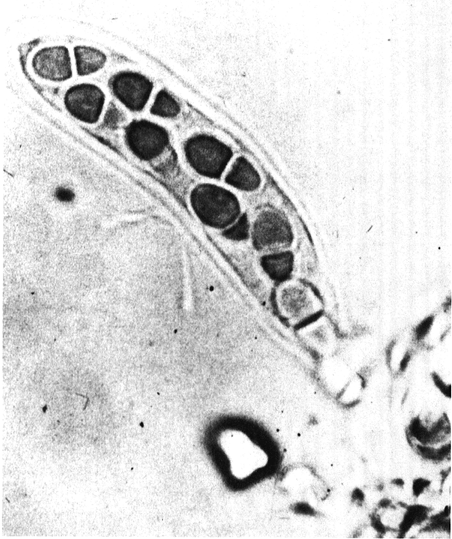
- Bitunicate ascus and ascospores of Didymella rabiei

Scientific classification
- Domain: Eukaryota
- Kingdom: Fungi
- Division: Ascomycota
- Class: Dothideomycetes
- Order: Pleosporales
- Family: Didymellaceae
- Genus: Didymella; Saccardo, 1880

= Didymella =

Genus of fungi

Didymella is a genus of fungi belonging to the family Didymellaceae.

The genus has cosmopolitan distribution.

== Species ==
The GBIF lists up to 317 species, while Species Fungorum lists 295 species (see list below).

Selected species include:

- Didymella aliena Fr. (1823)
- Didymella arachidicola (Khokhr.) Tomilin (1979)
- Didymella fabae G.J. Jellis & Punith. (1991)
- Didymella lycopersici Kleb. (1921)
- Didymella pinodella (L.K. Jones) Qian Chen & L. Cai (2015)
- Didymella pinodes (Berk. & A. Bloxam) Petr. (1924)
- Didymella proximella (P. Karst.) Sacc.
