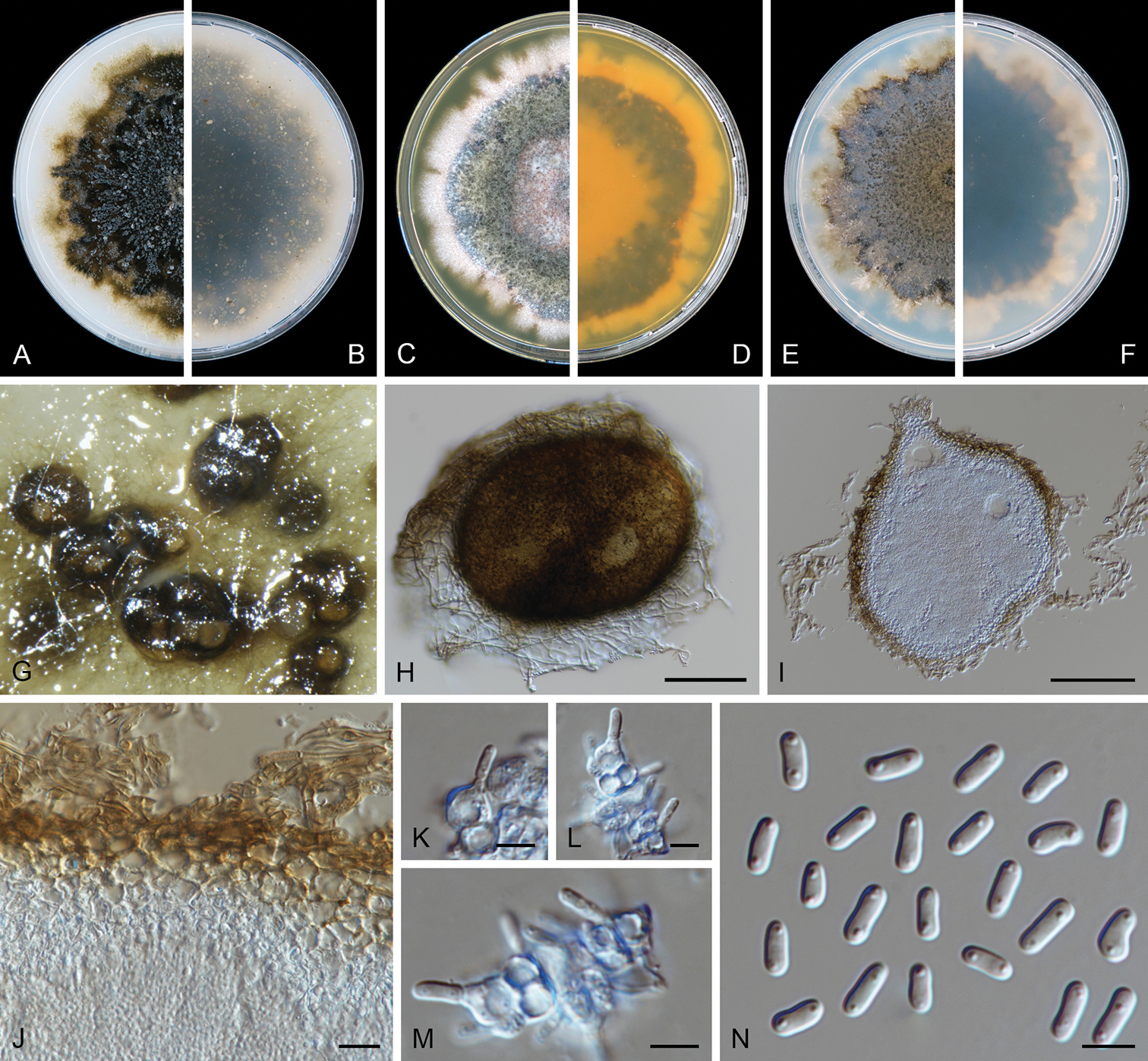
- Stagonosporopsis stuijvenbergii

Scientific classification
- Kingdom: Fungi
- Division: Ascomycota
- Class: Dothideomycetes
- Order: Pleosporales
- Family: Didymellaceae
- Genus: Stagonosporopsis

= Stagonosporopsis =

Genus of fungi

Stagonosporopsis is a genus of ascomycote fungi, containing several pathogens to plants.

== Taxonomy ==
- Stagonosporopsis
  - Stagonosporopsis curtisii, reassigned to Peyronellaea curtisii
  - Stagonosporopsis salicorniae
  - Stagonosporopsis equiseti
  - Stagonosporopsis aquilegiae

Stagonosporopsis has recently undergone major reorganisation together with many other genera within the Pleosporales. Therefore, a number of species such as Stagonosporopsis curtisii have been redistributed. S. curtisii is now known as Peyronellaea curtisii.

== See also ==
- Plant pathology
