= Didymella proximella =

Scientific classification
- Domain: Eukaryota
- Kingdom: Fungi
- Division: Ascomycota
- Class: Dothideomycetes
- Order: Pleosporales
- Family: Didymellaceae
- Genus: Didymella
- Species: D. proximella

Binomial name
- Didymella proximella (P.Karst.) Sacc. (1882)

Species of fungus

Didymella proximella is a species of fungus belonging to the family Didymellaceae. It is known to decompose the dead leaves of Carex capillaris.
