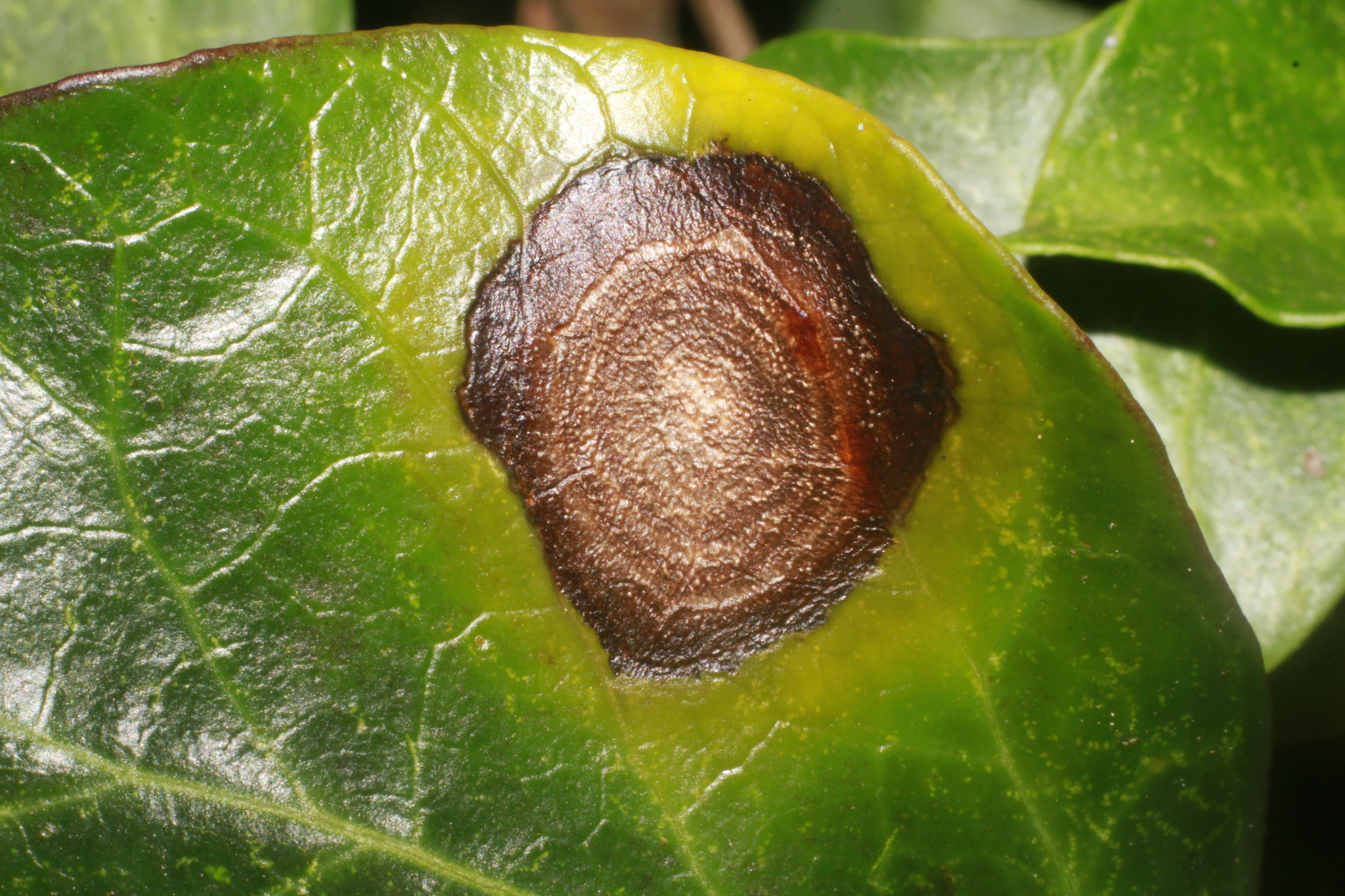
- Boeremia hedericola

Scientific classification
- Kingdom: Fungi
- Division: Ascomycota
- Class: Dothideomycetes
- Order: Pleosporales
- Family: Didymellaceae
- Genus: Boeremia; Aveskamp, Gruyter & Verkley

Type species
- Boeremia exigua (Desm.) Aveskamp, Gruyter & Verkley 2010

= Boeremia =

Genus of fungi

Boeremia is a genus of fungi belonging to the family Didymellaceae. It was first described by M.M. Aveskamp, J. de Gruyter, J.H.C. Woudenberg, G.J.M. Verkley and P.W. Crous in 2010, and the type species is Boeremia exigua.

The genus has almost cosmopolitan distribution.

Species:

- Boeremia crinicola (Siemaszko) Aveskamp, Gruyter & Verkley
- Boeremia diversispora (Bubák) Aveskamp, Gruyter & Verkley
- Boeremia exigua (Desm.) Aveskamp, Gruyter & Verkley
- Boeremia foveata (Foister) Aveskamp, Gruyter & Verkley
- Boeremia galiicola Jayasiri, Camporesi & K.D.Hyde
- Boeremia gilvescens (Aveskamp, Gruyter & Verkley) Jayaward., Jayasiri & K.D.Hyde
- Boeremia hedericola (Durieu & Mont.) Aveskamp, Gruyter & Verkley
- Boeremia heteromorpha (Schulzer & Sacc.) Jayaward., Jayasiri & K.D.Hyde
- Boeremia inoxydabilis (Boerema & Vegh) Jayaward., Jaysiri & K.D.Hyde
- Boeremia lilacis (Sacc.) Qian Chen & L.Cai
- Boeremia linicola (Naumov & Vassiljevsky) Jayaward., Jayasiri & K.D.Hyde
- Boeremia lycopersici (Cooke) Aveskamp, Gruyter & Verkley
- Boeremia maritima Dayar., E.B.G.Jones & K.D.Hyde
- Boeremia noackiana (Allesch.) Aveskamp, Gruyter & Verkley
- Boeremia opuli (Qian Chen, Crous & L.Cai) Jayaward., Jayasiri & K.D.Hyde
- Boeremia parva S.Y.Lee, L.N.Ten & H.Y.Jung
- Boeremia populi (Gruyter & P.Scheer) Jayaward., Jayasiri & K.D.Hyde
- Boeremia pseudolilacis (Aveskamp, Gruyter & Verkley) Jayaward., Jayasiri & K.D.Hyde
- Boeremia rhapontica (Berner, Woudenb. & Tunali) Jayaward., Jayasiri & K.D.Hyde
- Boeremia sambuci-nigrae (Sacc.) Aveskamp, Gruyter & Verkley
- Boeremia strasseri (Moesz) Aveskamp, Gruyter & Verkley
- Boeremia telephii (Vestergr.) Aveskamp, Gruyter & Verkley
- Boeremia trachelospermi Qian Chen & L.Cai
