= Phoma strasseri =

Scientific classification
- Domain: Eukaryota
- Kingdom: Fungi
- Division: Ascomycota
- Class: Dothideomycetes
- Order: Pleosporales
- Family: Didymellaceae
- Genus: Phoma
- Species: P. strasseri

Binomial name
- Phoma strasseri Moesz (1924)

Synonyms
- Phoma menthae Strasser (1910)

Species of fungus

Phoma strasseri is a fungal plant pathogen infecting mint.
