= Ascochyta fabae f.sp. lentis =

Scientific classification
- Kingdom: Fungi
- Division: Ascomycota
- Class: Dothideomycetes
- Order: Pleosporales
- Family: Didymellaceae
- Genus: Ascochyta
- Species: A. fabae
- Forma specialis: A. f. f.sp. lentis

Trionomial name
- Ascochyta fabae f.sp. lentis Gossen, Sheard, C.J. Beauch., & Morrall (1986)

Forma specialis of fungi

Ascochyta fabae f.sp. lentis is a plant pathogen that causes ascochyta blight on lentil.

== See also ==
- List of Ascochyta species
