= Chaetopyrena =

Scientific classification
- Domain: Eukaryota
- Kingdom: Fungi
- Division: Ascomycota
- Class: Dothideomycetes
- Order: Pleosporales
- Family: Didymellaceae
- Genus: Chaetopyrena; Passerini, 1881

Genus of fungi

Chaetopyrena is a genus of fungi belonging to the family Didymellaceae.

The species of this genus are found in Europe and Northern America.

== Species ==
As accepted by Species Fungorum;

- Chaetopyrena hederae-helicis Săvul. & Hulea (1940)
- Chaetopyrena hesperidium Pass. (1881)
- Chaetopyrena poae (Niessl) Sacc. (1928)
- Chaetopyrena rumicina S.Ahmad (1971)
- Chaetopyrena penicillata (Fuckel) Höhn. (1918)
- Chaetopyrena ubrizsyi Negru & R.Sandor (1964)

Former species;

- C. culmicola (Berl. & Voglino) Sacc. (1928) = Metasphaeria graminum, Saccotheciaceae
- C. erysimi (Hollós) Petr. (1921) = Pyrenochaeta erysimi, Pleosporomycetidae
- C. hispidulum (Corda) Moesz (1931) = Chaetosphaeronema hispidulum, Ascomycota
- C. taquarae (Starbäck) Sacc. (1928) = Keissleriella culmifida, Lentitheciaceae
- C. trichostoma (Pass.) Sacc. (1928) = Metasphaeria trichostoma, Saccotheciaceae
