= Peyronellaea curtisii =

Scientific classification
- Kingdom: Fungi
- Division: Ascomycota
- Class: Dothideomycetes
- Order: Pleosporales
- Family: Didymellaceae
- Genus: Peyronellaea
- Species: P. curtsii

Binomial name
- Peyronellaea curtsii (Berk.) Aveskamp, Gruyter & Verkley 2010

Synonyms
- Stagonosporopsis curtisii (Berk.) Boerema; Stagonospora curtisii (Berk.) Sacc.

Species of fungus

Peyronellaea curtisii (leaf scorch) is a fungal plant pathogen first described by Miles Joseph Berkeley and received its current name in 2010. Formerly it was Stagonospora (syn. Stagonosporopsis) curtisii. It is a cause of leaf blotch, and its substrates include Narcissus, Galanthus and Hippeastrum.

== Symptoms ==
Peyronellaea curtisii causes red-brown spots on leaf tips of Narcissus and other members of the family Amaryllidaceae; this gives them a scorched appearance that is easily mistaken for frost damage. A yellowish discolouration then spreads down the leaf; more spots may develop as the leaf withers, turns brown and die away. Minute black fungal fruiting bodies may be visible on the foliage. The flowers and flower stalks may also display brown spots and marks.

On hippeastrum bulbs the fungus causes red spots that may develop into soft, sunken patches. Leaf scorch fungus can also affect other members of the Amaryllidaceae, including Amaryllis, Crinum, Nerine, Sprekelia and Sternbergia.

== Bibliography ==
- "Peyronellaea curtsii". National Center for Biotechnology Information (NCBI).
- Peyronellaea curtisii in MycoBank.
