= Didymella arachidicola =

Scientific classification
- Domain: Eukaryota
- Kingdom: Fungi
- Division: Ascomycota
- Class: Dothideomycetes
- Order: Pleosporales
- Family: Didymellaceae
- Genus: Didymella
- Species: D. arachidicola

Binomial name
- Didymella arachidicola (Khokhr.) Tomilin, (1979)

Synonyms
- Ascochyta adzamethica Schosch., (1940); Ascochyta arachidis Woron., (1924); Didymella arachidicola (Khokhr.) Tomilin, (1979); Didymosphaeria arachidicola (Khokhr.) Alcorn, Punith. & MacCarthy, (1976); Mycosphaerella arachidicola Khokhr., (1934); Mycosphaerella argentinensis Frezzi, (1969); Phoma arachidicola Marasas, Pauer & Boerema, (1974)

Species of fungus

Didymella arachidicola (syn. Didymosphaeria arachidicola) is a plant pathogen.
