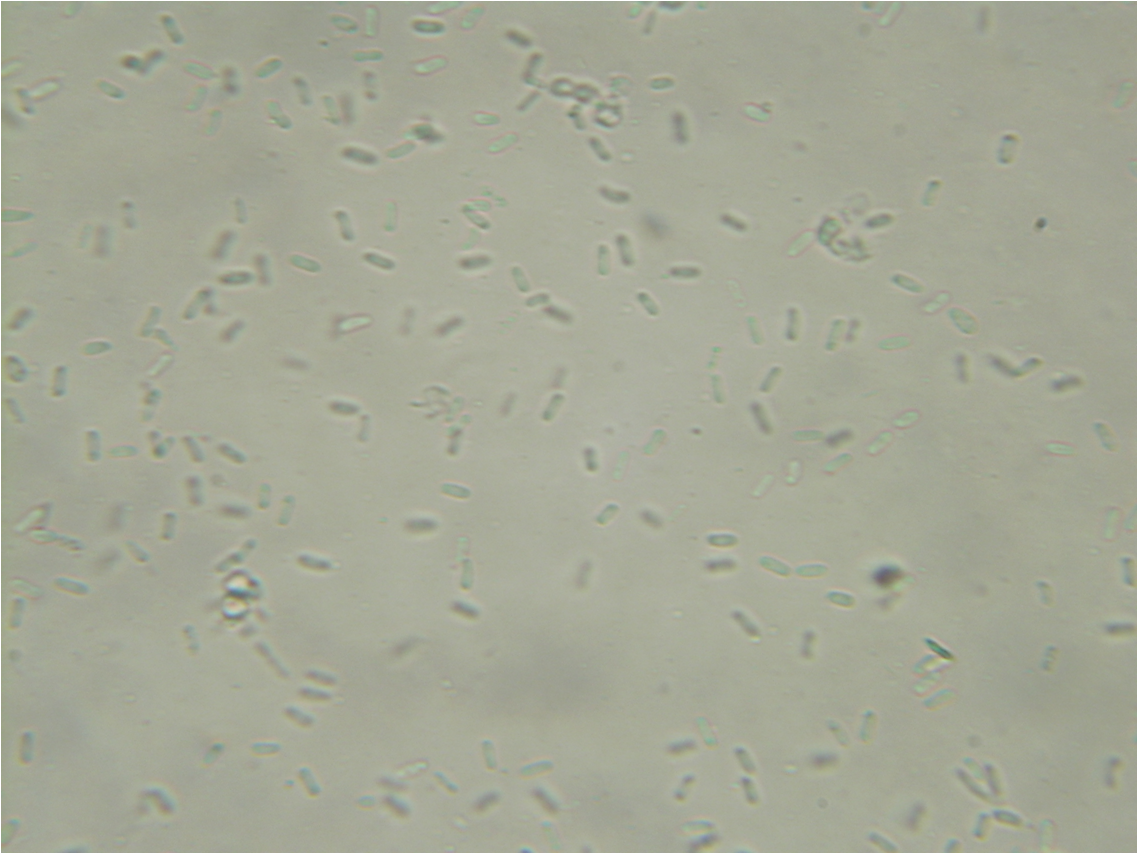
- Phoma exigua spores

Scientific classification
- Kingdom: Fungi
- Division: Ascomycota
- Class: Dothideomycetes
- Order: Pleosporales
- Family: Didymellaceae
- Genus: Boeremia
- Species: B. exigua

Binomial name
- Boeremia exigua (Desm.) Aveskamp, Gruyter & Verkley (2010)

Synonyms
- Phoma exigua Sacc. (1879); Phomopsis perexigua (Sacc.) Traverso (1906); Phyllosticta sambuci Desm. (1847)

= Boeremia exigua =

Species of fungus

Boeremia exigua is the type species of the fungus genus, Boeremia, in the Didymellaceae family. It was first described as Phoma exigua by John Baptiste Henri Joseph Desmazières in 1849, and transferred to the genus, Boeremia, by M.M. Aveskamp, J. de Gruyter, J.H.C. Woudenberg, G.J.M. Verkley and P.W. Crous in 2010.

Desmazières describes the species as occurring on stems and dried leaves, with two varieties: one of which is found on the stems and leaves of a Polygonum species, and the other on the stems and leaves of Ranunculus.

It causes wet weather blight in cotton and it can be treated with systemic copper.
