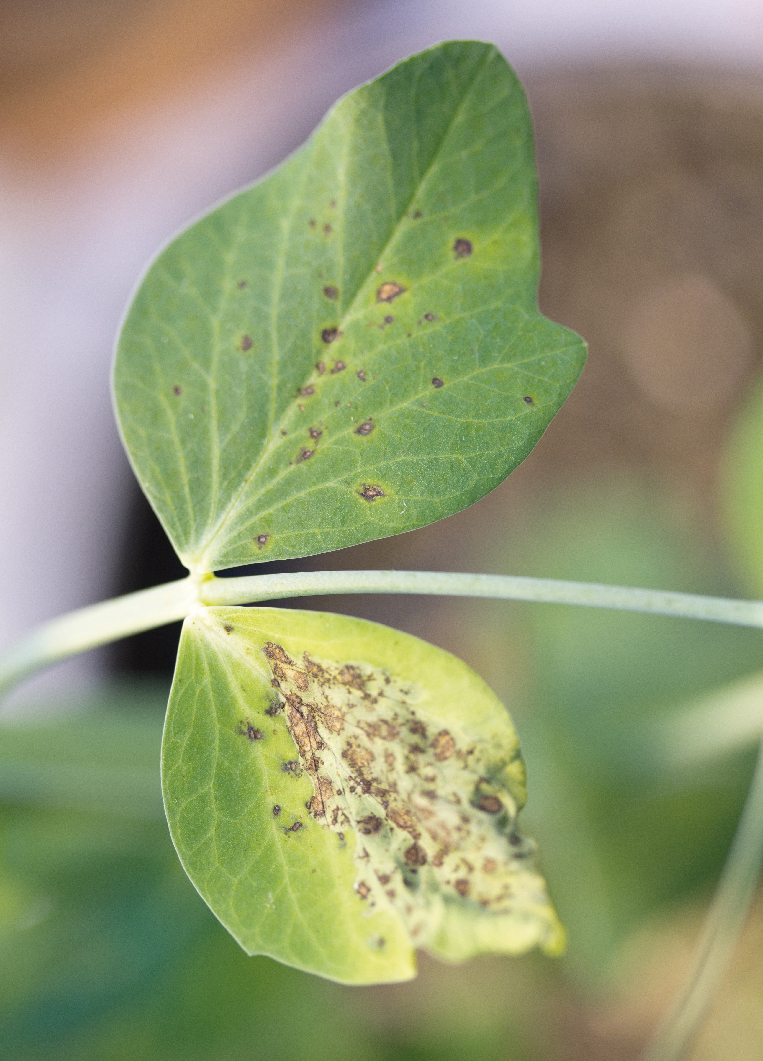
- Peyronellaea pinodes causing necrotic lesions of leaves of field pea

Scientific classification
- Kingdom: Fungi
- Division: Ascomycota
- Class: Dothideomycetes
- Order: Pleosporales
- Family: Didymellaceae
- Genus: Peyronellaea; Goid. ex Togliani, emend. Aveskamp, Gruyter, & Verkley

Type species
- Peyronellaea glomerata (Corda) Goid. ex Togliani

= Peyronellaea =

Genus of fungi

Peyronellaea is a genus of fungi in the family Didymellaceae. It contains a number of plant pathogens.

The genus name of Peyronellaea is in honour of Beniamino Peyronel (1890-1975), who was an Italian botanist (Mycology and Lichenology) from the University of Turin.

The genus was circumscribed by Gabriele Goidànich in Atti Accad. Naz. Lincei, Rendiconti Cl. Sci. Fis. Mat. Nat. ser.8, vol.1 on page 450 in 1946.

== Taxonomy ==
Following a phylogenetic analysis of the asexual genus Phoma, section Peyronellaea was raised to the rank of genus. It contains many of the chlamydospore forming species of that genus, from both section Peyronellaea and other sections.

Species as accepted by Species Fungorum;

- Peyronellaea calorpreferens (Boerema, Gruyter & Noordel.) Aveskamp, Gruyter & Verkley (2010)
- Peyronellaea cincta (Berk. & M.A. Curtis) Goid. (1952)
- Peyronellaea consors (Schulzer & Sacc.) Goid. (1952)
- Peyronellaea eucalyptica (Sacc.) Aveskamp, Gruyter & Verkley (2010)
- Peyronellaea fictilis (Delacr.) Goid. (1952)
- Peyronellaea lethalis (Ellis & Barthol.) Aveskamp, Gruyter & Verkley (2010)
- Peyronellaea nainiensis Tandon & Bilgrami (1961)
- Peyronellaea nicotiae Parg.-Leduc (1958)
- Peyronellaea nigricans Kusnezowa (1971)
- Peyronellaea obtusa (Fuckel) Aveskamp, Gruyter & Verkley (2010)
- Peyronellaea pruni-avium (Allesch.) Goid. (1952)
- Peyronellaea ruptilis Kusnezowa (1971)
- Peyronellaea sibirica Kusnezowa (1971)
- Peyronellaea stemphylioides Kusnezowa (1971)
- Peyronellaea veronensis Goid. (1952)
- Peyronellaea zhdanovae Kusnezowa (1971)
