= Boeremia lycopersici =

Scientific classification
- Domain: Eukaryota
- Kingdom: Fungi
- Division: Ascomycota
- Class: Dothideomycetes
- Order: Pleosporales
- Family: Didymellaceae
- Genus: Boeremia
- Species: B. lycopersici

Binomial name
- Boeremia lycopersici (Cooke) Aveskamp et al., (2010)

Synonyms
- Ascochyta lycopersici Brunaud, (1887); Didymella lycopersici Kleb., (1921); Diplodina lycopersici Hollós, (1907); Phoma lycopersici (Plowr.) Jacz., (1898); Sphaeronaema lycopersici Plowr.,(1881)

Species of fungus

Boeremia lycopersici (syn. Didymella lycopersici) is a fungal plant pathogen infecting tomatoes and strawberries.
