= Platychora =

Scientific classification
- Domain: Eukaryota
- Kingdom: Fungi
- Division: Ascomycota
- Class: Dothideomycetes
- Order: Pleosporales
- Family: Venturiaceae
- Genus: Platychora; Petr.

Type species
- Platychora ulmi (Schleich.) Petr.

Species
- P. alni P. ulmi

Genus of fungi

Platychora( also known as Platychora ulmi Duval ) is a genus of fungi in the family Venturiaceae. Platychora ulmi is a plant pathogen infecting elms.
