= Didymella pinodella =

Scientific classification
- Domain: Eukaryota
- Kingdom: Fungi
- Division: Ascomycota
- Class: Dothideomycetes
- Order: Pleosporales
- Family: Didymellaceae
- Genus: Didymella
- Species: D. pinodella

Binomial name
- Didymella pinodella (L.K. Jones) Q. Chen & L. Cai, (2015)

Synonyms
- Ascochyta pinodella L.K. Jones, (1927); Phoma medicaginis var. pinodella (L.K. Jones) Boerema, (1965); Phoma pinodella (L.K. Jones) Morgan-Jones & K.B. Burch, (1987); Phoma trifolii E.M. Johnson & Valleau, (1933)

Species of fungus

Didymella pinodella (syn. Phoma pinodella) is a fungal plant pathogen infecting pea and red clover.
