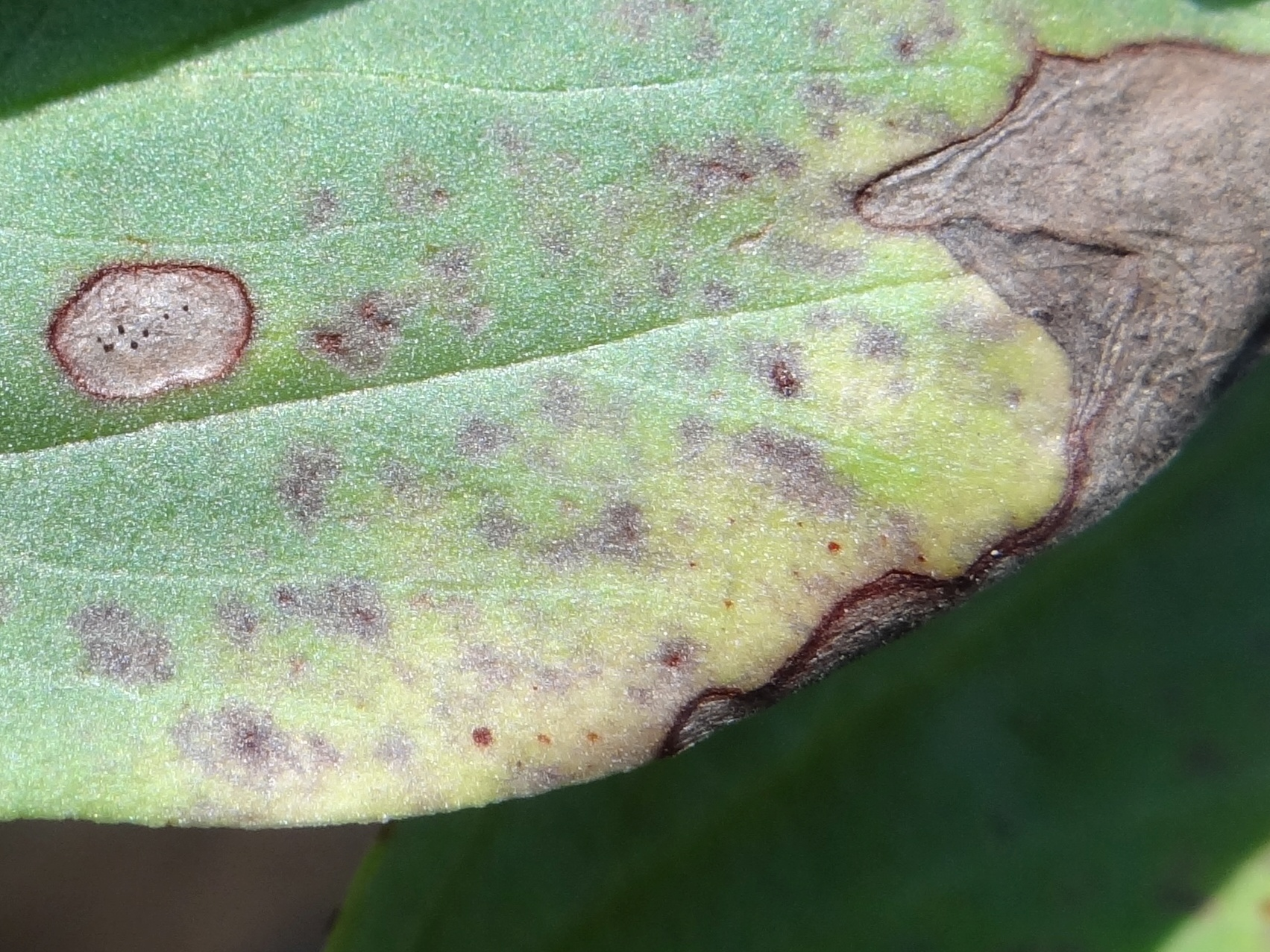
- Ascochyta fabae on Vicia faba

Scientific classification
- Kingdom: Fungi
- Division: Ascomycota
- Class: Dothideomycetes
- Order: Pleosporales
- Family: Didymellaceae
- Genus: Ascochyta
- Species: A. fabae

Binomial name
- Ascochyta fabae Speg. (1898)

Synonyms
- Ascochyta pisi f. foliicola Sacc. & Marchal, (1885); Ascochyta pisi var. foliicola (Sacc. & Marchal) Wollenw. & Hochapfel, (1936); Ascochyta pisi var. fabae R. Sprague, (1947); Didymella fabae G.J. Jellis & Punith., (1991)

= Ascochyta fabae =

Species of fungus

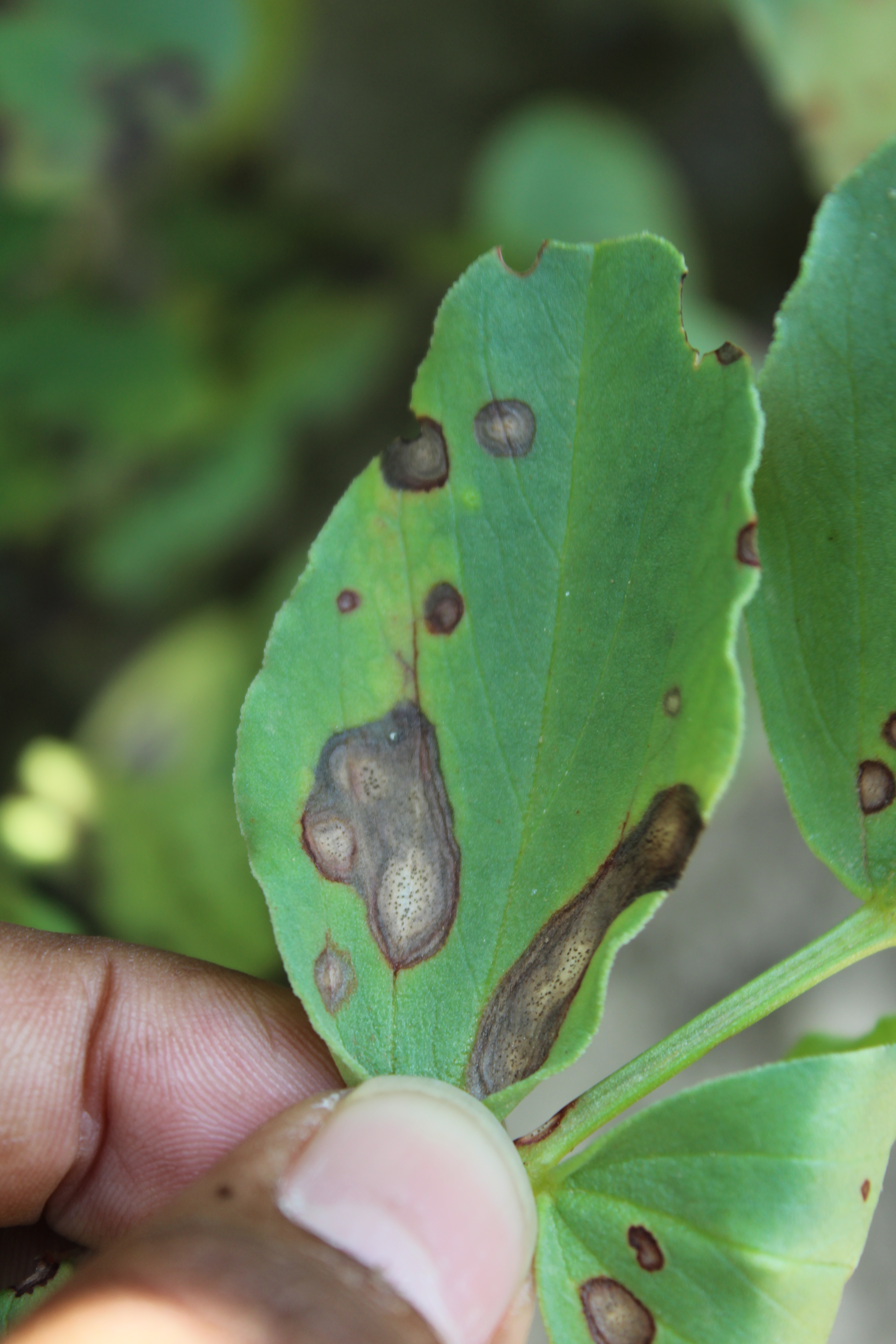
Ascochyta fabae on Vicia faba

Ascochyta fabae is a plant pathogen.

It includes the subtaxa:

- Ascochyta fabae f.sp. fabae
- Ascochyta fabae f.sp. lentis
- Ascochyta fabae f.sp. viciae

== See also ==
- List of Ascochyta species
