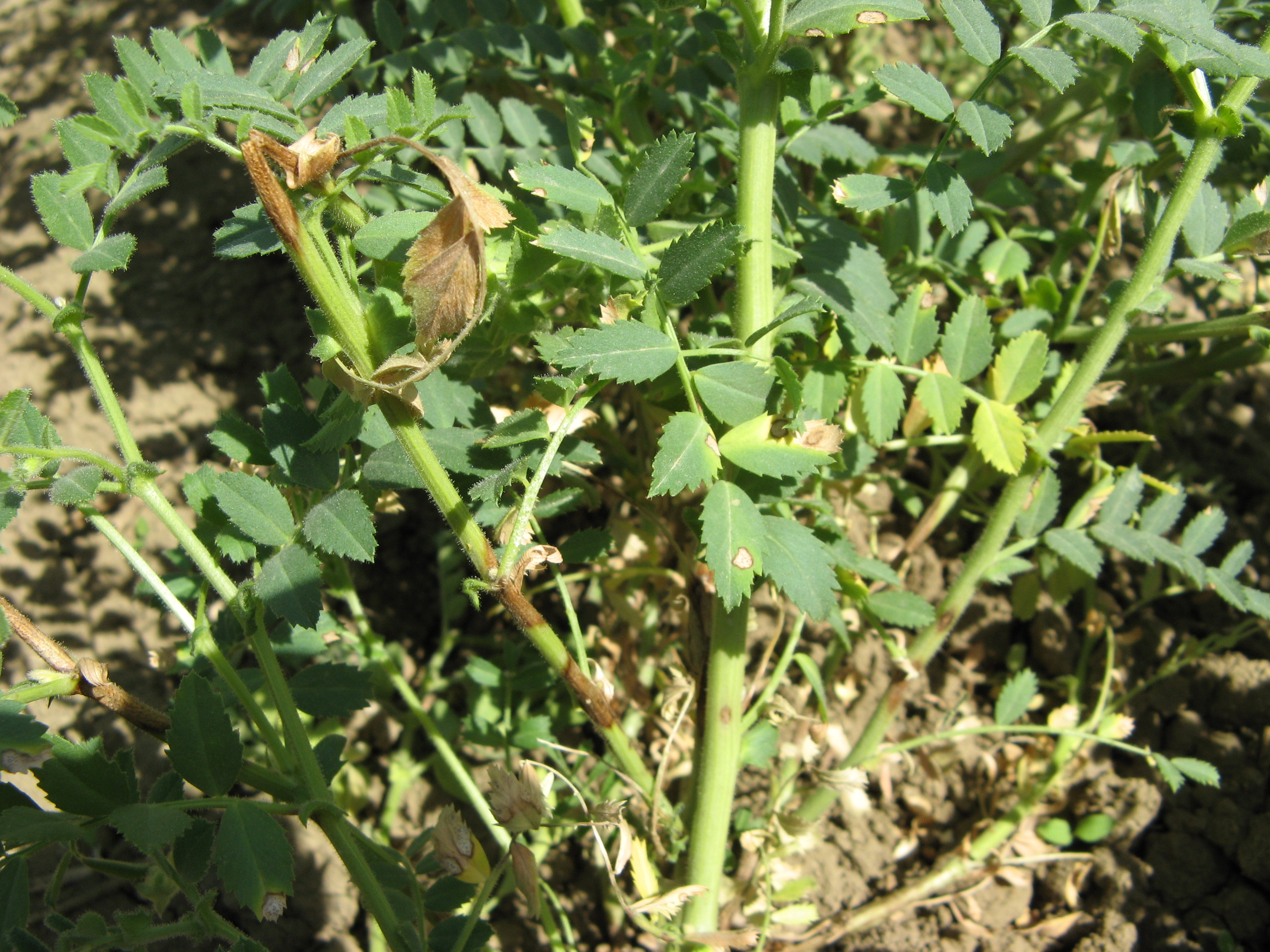
- Didymella rabiei (chickpea ascochyta blight fungus)

Scientific classification
- Kingdom: Fungi
- Division: Ascomycota
- Class: Dothideomycetes
- Order: Pleosporales
- Family: Didymellaceae; Gruyter, Aveskamp & Verkley 2009

Type genus
- Didymella

Genera
- see text

Synonyms
- Microsphaeropsidaceae Qian Chen, L. Cai & Crous - Stud. Mycol. 82: 213 (2015)

= Didymellaceae =

Family of fungi

The Didymellaceae are a family of fungi in the order Pleosporales. They have a world-wide distribution.

Recent phylogenetic examination of some of the larger genera of the Pleosporales, particularly Phoma, has led to considerable reorganisation of the order, many of the species being placed in this family.

It was originally described including the genera Atradidymella, Boeremia, Chaetopyrena, Didymella, Endophoma, Leptosphaerulina, Macroventuria, Peyronellaea, Phoma, Platychora and Stagonosporopsis.

Atradidymella is now placed within Pleosporales order, and Endophoma (is unplaced).

== Taxonomy ==
Genera as accepted by GBIF, Figures in brackets are approx. how many species per genus;

- Allophoma Q.Chen & L.Cai, 2015 (14)
- Amerodothis (3)
- Ascochyta Lib., 1830 (819)
- Ascochytella Tassi (14)
- Ascochytula (Potebnia) Died., 1912 (6)
- Boeremia Aveskamp, Gruyter & Verkley (26)
- Briansuttonomyces Crous (1)
- Calophoma Qian Chen & L.Cai (19)
- Cerebella Ces. (5)
- Chaetasbolisia Speg. (7)
- Chaetopyrena Pass. (6)
- Chlamydosporium Peyronel (1)
- Deuterophoma (3)
- Didymella Saccardo, 1880 (343)
- Didymellocamarosporium (1)
- Didysimulans (2)
- Epicoccum Link, 1816 (98)
- Extrusothecium T.Matsushima, 1996 (2)
- Heterophoma Q.T.Chen & L.Cai (7)
- Juxtiphoma Valenz.-Lopez, Cano, Crous, Guarro & Stchigel (3)
- Leptophoma (1)
- Leptosphaerulina McAlpine, 1902 (56)
- Macroventuria Van der Aa, 1971 (2)
- Neoascochyta Q.T.Chen & L.Cai (22)
- Neodidymella (1)
- Neodidymelliopsis (11)
- Neomicrosphaeropsis (10)
- Nothophoma (14)
- Paraboeremia Q.T.Chen & L.Cai (12)
- Paratrichaegum (1)
- Peyronellaea Goid., 1952 (21)
- Phaeomycocentrospora Crous, H.D.Shin & U.Braun (2)
- Phoma Sacc., 1880 (1k)
- Phomatodes Q.Chen & L.Cai, 2015 (3)
- Piggotia (9)
- Pithomyces Berk. & Broome (44)
- Platychora Petr. (1)
- Polyopeus A.S.Horne (1)
- Pseudoascochyta (2)
- Scheleobrachea (1)
- Sclerochaeta (1)
- Sclerophomella Höhn. (3)
- Sclerophomina (1)
- Scleropleella Höhn. (1)
- Similiphoma (1)
- Stagonosporopsis Died., 1912 (44)
- Stemphyliomma (2)
- Vacuiphoma (2)
- Vandijckomycella M.Hernández-Restrepo, L.W.Hou, L.Cai & P.W.Crous, 2020 (2)
- Xenodidymella Q.T.Chen & L.Cai (7)

== Bibliography ==
- Aveskamp, M.M.; de Gruyter, J.; Woudenberg, J.H.C.; Verkley, G.J.M.; Crous, P.W. (2010). "Highlights of the Didymellaceae: A polyphasic approach to characterise Phoma and related pleosporalean genera". Studies in Mycology. 65: 1–60. doi:10.3114/sim.2010.65.01. PMC 2836210. PMID 20502538.
- Zhang Y, Schoch CL, Fournier J, Crous PW, Gruyter J De, Woudenberg JHC, Hirayama K, Tanaka K, Pointing SB, Hyde KD. 2009. Multi-locus phylogeny of the Pleosporales: a taxonomic, ecological and evolutionary re-evaluation. Studies in Mycology 64: 85–102.
