= List of papaya diseases =

This article is a list of diseases of papaya (Carica papaya).

== Bacterial diseases ==
Bacterial diseases
| Bacterial canker | Erwinia sp. |
| Bacterial leaf spot | Pseudomonas caricapapayae |
| Bacterial wilt | Pseudomonas solanacearum |
| Papaya Bunchy Top Disease | Rickettsia |
| Erwinia decline | Erwinia sp. |
| Erwinia mushy canker | Erwinia sp. |
| Internal yellowing | Enterobacter cloacae |
| Purple stain | Erwinia herbicola |

== Fungal diseases ==
Fungal diseases
| Alternaria fruit spot | Alternaria alternata |
| Angular leaf spot | Leveillula taurica |
| Anthracnose | Colletotrichum gloeosporioides |
| Black spot | Asperisporium caricae Cercospora papayae Phomopsis caricae-papayae |
| Blossom spot | Choanephora cucurbitarum |
| Black rot | Mycosphaerella caricae |
| Brown spot | Corynespora cassiicola = Cercospora melonis = Cercospora vignicola = Helminthosporium cassiicola = Helminthosporium vignae = Helminthosporium vignicola |
| Chocolate spot | Colletotrichum gloeosporioides |
| Collar rot | Cylindrocladium crotalariae Calonectria crotalariae [teleomorph] |
| Damping off | Colletotrichum gloeosporioides Phytophthora palmivora Phytophthora nicotianae Phytophthora parasitica Pythium aphanidermatum Pythium debaryanum Pythium ultimum Pythium sp. Rhizoctonia solani Thanatephorus cucumeris [teleomorph] |
| Dry rot | Phoma caricae-papayae = Ascochyta caricae = Ascochyta caricae-papayae = Mycosphaerella caricae [teleomorph] |
| Foot rot | Pythium aphanidermatum Pythium ultimum |
| Fruit rot | Monilia sp. |
| Fruit spot | Cercospora mamaonis |
| Fusarium fruit rot | Fusarium solani Fusarium spp. |
| Guignardia spot | Guignardia sp. |
| Greasy spot | Corynespora cassiicola = Cercospora melonis = Cercospora vignicola = Helminthosporium cassiicola = Helminthosporium vignae = Helminthosporium vignicola |
| Internal blight | Cladosporium sp. Fusarium sp. Penicillium sp. |
| Lasiodiplodia fruit rot | Lasiodiplodia theobromae = Botryodiplodia theobromae = Botryodiplodia gossypii = Diplodia theobromae = Diplodia gossypina = Diplodia natalensis = Lasiodiplodia triflorae |
| Leaf spot | Alternaria sp. Asperisporium caricae Cercospora mamaonis Cercospora papayae Choanephora cucurbitarum Curvularia caricae-papayae Gloeosporium sp. Phoma caricae-papayae Mycosphaerella caricae [teleomorph] Phyllosticta sp. |
| Petiole spot | Didymella sp. |
| Phytophthora blight | Phytophthora palmivora Phytophthora nicotianae var. parasitica Phytophthora parasitica |
| Powdery mildew | Phyllactinia caricifolia Phyllactinia caricicola Phyllactinia caricae Erysiphe diffusa Erysiphe caricae Erysiphe caricae-papayae Erysiphe fallax Podosphaera caricicola Podosphaera xanthii complex |
| Phytophthora fruit rot | Phytophthora capsici Phytophthora nicotianae var. parasitica Phytophthora parasitica Phytophthora palmivora |
| Rhizopus soft rot | Rhizopus stolonifer = Rhizopus nigricans |
| Root rot | Phytophthora palmivora Pythium aphanidermatum Pythium ultimum Pythium spp. Rhizoctonia solani Thanatephorus cucumeris [teleomorph] |
| Sclerotium blight | Sclerotium rolfsii Athelia rolfsii [teleomorph] |
| Seedling blight | Colletotrichum gloeosporioides |
| Stem-end rot | Alternaria alterneta Colletotrichum gloeosporioides Fusarium sp. Lasiodiplodia theobromae = Botryodiplodia theobromae = Botryodiplodia gossypii = Diplodia theobromae = Diplodia gossypina = Diplodia natalensis = Lasiodiplodia triflorae = Phoma caricae-papayae = Ascochyta caricae = Ascochyta caricae-papayae Mycosphaerella caricae [teleomorph] Phomopsis sp. Rhizopus stolonifer |
| Stemphylium fruit spot | Stemphylium lycopersici = Thyrospora lycopersici = Stemphylium floridanum |
| Stem rot | Fusarium solani Nectria haematococca [teleomorph] Fusarium sp. Phytophthora palmivora Pythium aphanidermatum Pythium ultimum |
| Target spot | Phyllosticta caricae-papayae |
| Verticillium wilt | Verticillium dahliae |
| Wet fruit rot | Phomopsis sp. |

== Miscellaneous diseases and disorders ==
Miscellaneous diseases and disorders
| Algal leaf spot | Cephaleuros virescens |
| Bumpy fruit | Boron deficiency |
| Freckles | Physiological |
| Nivum Haamir dieback | Unknown cause |

== Nematodes, parasitic ==
Nematodes, parasitic
| Reniform nematode | Rotylenchulus reniformis Rotylenchulus parvus |
| Root-knot nematode | Meloidogyne incognita Meloidogyne javanica Meloidogyne arenaria Meloidogyne hapla |

== Phytoplasmal diseases ==
Phytoplasmal diseases
| Dieback | Phytoplasma |
| Yellow crinkle | Phytoplasma |

== Viral and viroid diseases ==
Viral and viroid diseases
| Apical necrosis | Papaya apical necrosis virus |
| Droopy necrosis | Papaya droopy necrosis virus |
| Feather leaf | Unknown virus |
| Leaf curl | Virus suspected |
| Mosaic | Papaya mosaic virus |
| Papaya ringspot | Papaya ringspot virus |
| Papaya lethal yellowing | Papaya lethal yellowing virus |
| Spotted wilt | Tomato spotted wilt virus |
| Sticky disease ('meleira') | Papaya meleira virus complex |
| Terminal necrosis and wilt | Tobacco ringspot virus |
