= List of coffee diseases =

This article is a list of diseases of coffee (Coffea arabica, Coffea canephora).

== Fungal diseases ==
Fungal diseases
Anthracnose	Colletotrichum gloeosporioides Glomerella cingulata [teleomorph] Colletotrichum kahawae
Armillaria root rot	Armillaria mellea
Algal (red) leaf spot	Cephaleuros virescens
Bark disease	Fusarium stilboides Gibberella stilboides [teleomorph]
Berry blotch	Cercospora coffeicola
Black (Rosellinia) root rot	Rosellinia spp.
Black (seedling) root rot	Rhizoctonia solani
Brown blight	Colletotrichum gloeosporioides Glomerella cingulata [teleomorph] Colletotrichum kahawae
Brown eye spot	Cercospora coffeicola
Brown leaf spot	Phoma costaricensis
Canker	Ceratocystis fimbriata Phomopsis coffeae
Collar rot	Fusarium stilboides Gibberella stilboides [teleomorph]
Coffee berry disease	Colletotrichum kahawae
Die-back	Ascochyta tarda
Dry root rot	Fusarium solani
Leaf blight	Ascochyta tarda
Leaf spot	Phyllosticta coffeicola
Pink disease	Phanerochaete salmonicolor
Red blister disease (robusta coffee)	Cercospora coffeicola
Red root rot	Ganoderma philippii
Rust (orange or leaf rust)	Hemileia vastatrix
Rust (powdery or grey rust)	Hemileia coffeicola
South America leaf spot	Mycena citricolor Omphalia flavida Stilbum flavidum [anamorph]
Thread blight	Corticium koleroga
Tip blast	Phoma costaricensis
Tracheomycosis (Wilt)	Gibberella xylarioides Fusarium xylarioides [anamorph]
Wilt	Ceratocystis fimbriata Fusarium oxysporum f.sp. coffea
Warty berry	Botrytis cinerea var. coffeae

== Insect pests ==
- Antestia: shield bugs
- Hypothenemus hampei: the coffee berry borer

== Nematodes, parasitic ==
Nematodes, parasitic
Root knot	Meloidogyne spp.

== Viral diseases ==
Viral diseases
Coffee Ringspot Virus (CoRSV)	Virus Dichorhavirus

== Miscellaneous diseases and disorders ==
- Leaf miners (moths) - Leucoptera caffeina, Leucoptera coffeella

Miscellaneous diseases and disorders
Hot and cold disease	Physiologic effect of exposure to extremes of temperature – common at high altitudes
Physiological effect of overbearing	Often exacerbated by rust
