= List of Ascochyta species =

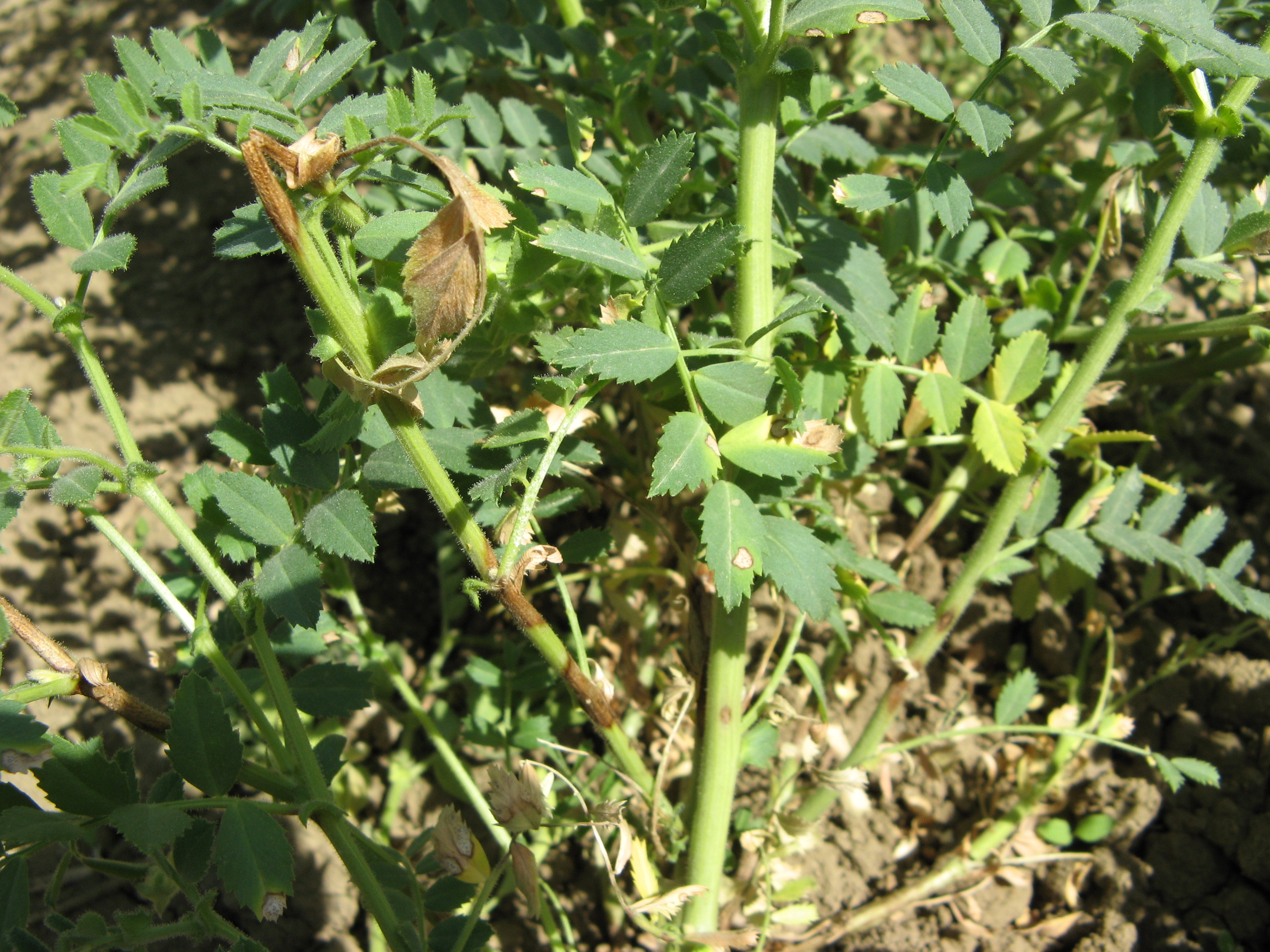
Ascochyta rabiei on chickpea

This is a list of the fungus species in the genus Ascochyta. Many are plant pathogens. Ascochyta is an anamorph for many species placed in Didymella (the teleomorph) but both names refer to the same organism. As of 17 April 2018 there were 1,184 species included. There is also one subgenus: Ascochyta subgen. Ascochyta Lib..

Species listed with authors and dates are accepted by Species Fungorum (in July 2023).

== A ==
- Ascochyta abelmoschi Harter (1918)
- Ascochyta abramovii Nelen (1977)
- Ascochyta abroniae R. Sprague (1937)
- Ascochyta abutilonicola Massenot (1951)
- Ascochyta abutilonis Hollós (1909)
- Ascochyta acericola Massa (1912)
- Ascochyta achlydis Dearn. (1916)
- Ascochyta aconitana Melnik (1971)
- Ascochyta aconiti Moesz (1924)
- Ascochyta acori Oudem. (1898)
- Ascochyta actinidiae Tobisch (1934)
- Ascochyta aculeorum Bres. (1926)
- Ascochyta adenocaulonis Melnik (1970)
- Ascochyta adenophorae Melnik (1970)
- Ascochyta adenostylis Kabát & Bubák (1906)
- Ascochyta adzamethica
- Ascochyta aegilopis Punith. (1979)
- Ascochyta aegopodii
- Ascochyta aeridis Subhedar & V.G. Rao (1979)
- Ascochyta aerospora
- Ascochyta aesculi
- Ascochyta affinis Jaap (1916)
- Ascochyta agerati Nelen (1966)
- Ascochyta aggregata
- Ascochyta agrimoniae Lebedeva (1922)
- Ascochyta agropyrina (Fairm.) Trotter (1931)
- Ascochyta agropyri-repentis Punith. (1979)
- Ascochyta agrostidis
- Ascochyta agrostis Polozova (1969)
- Ascochyta ahmadii Punith. (1979)
- Ascochyta ailanthi
- Ascochyta ajugae
- Ascochyta akebiae
- Ascochyta akselae Melnik (1970)
- Ascochyta alaskensis Punith. (1979)
- Ascochyta albomaculata Dobrozr. (1927)
- Ascochyta alceina
- Ascochyta aleuritidis
- Ascochyta aleuritis Saccas & Drouillon (1951)
- Ascochyta alfrediae Vasyag. (1968)
- Ascochyta alhagi (Lobik) Melnik (1971)
- Ascochyta alismatias
- Ascochyta alismatis
- Ascochyta alkekengi C. Massal. (1900)
- Ascochyta allii Hollós (1928)
- Ascochyta allii-cepae Punith., Gladders & McKeown (1985)
- Ascochyta alni Siemaszko (1923)
- Ascochyta aloidis
- Ascochyta alopecuri Polozova (1969)
- Ascochyta alpina
- Ascochyta alstoniae Henn. (1902)
- Ascochyta althaeina Sacc. & Bizz. (1884)
- Ascochyta amaranthi Allesch. (1900)
- Ascochyta ambrosiana Unamuno (1928)
- Ascochyta amelanchieris Melnik (1967)
- Ascochyta amorphae
- Ascochyta amorphophallicola Punith. & Peregrine (1988)
- Ascochyta ampelina
- Ascochyta andropogonivora
- Ascochyta androsaceae
- Ascochyta androsaces T.M. Achundov (1971)
- Ascochyta anemones
- Ascochyta anethicola
- Ascochyta angelicae Vakhrush. (1974)
- Ascochyta angelicarum Chevassut (2002)
- Ascochyta anisomera Kabát & Bubák (1904)
- Ascochyta annonaceae Henn. (1904)
- Ascochyta anonaceae
- Ascochyta antarctica Henn. (1906)
- Ascochyta anthistiriae McAlpine (1903)
- Ascochyta anthoxanthi Kalymb. (1968)
- Ascochyta antirrhini
- Ascochyta aphyllanthis Henn. (1902)
- Ascochyta apiospora
- Ascochyta aquatica
- Ascochyta aquifolii
- Ascochyta aquilariae P.K. Chi (1994)
- Ascochyta aquilegiae (Roum. & Pat.) Sacc. (1884)
- Ascochyta arachidis
- Ascochyta araliae J.D. Sun & J.K. Bai (1995)
- Ascochyta araujae
- Ascochyta arctica (Lind) Punith. (1979)
- Ascochyta arcuata
- Ascochyta arenaria
- Ascochyta argillacea
- Ascochyta ari Died. (1912)
- Ascochyta aricola A.L. Sm. & Ramsb. (1913)
- Ascochyta arida McAlpine (1903)
- Ascochyta arigena
- Ascochyta aristolochiae
- Ascochyta aristolochicola
- Ascochyta aristolochiicola Hollós (1907)
- Ascochyta armoraciae
- Ascochyta arnicae
- Ascochyta aromatica Kabát & Bubák (1904)
- Ascochyta arophila
- Ascochyta artemisiae Bond.-Mont. (1923)
- Ascochyta arunci Sacc. (1904)
- Ascochyta arundinariae
- Ascochyta arundinis
- Ascochyta asari Bond.-Mont. (1945)
- Ascochyta asclepiadearum Traverso (1903)
- Ascochyta asclepiadicola
- Ascochyta asclepiadis
- Ascochyta asparagina (Petr.) P.K. Buchanan (1987)
- Ascochyta aspidistrae
- Ascochyta asteris (Bres.) Gloyer (1924)
- Ascochyta astragali Lebedeva (1922)
- Ascochyta astragalicola Petr. (1928)
- Ascochyta astragalina (Rehm ex Sacc.) L.W. Hou, L. Cai & Crous (2020)
- Ascochyta astrantiae
- Ascochyta atra
- Ascochyta atraphaxidis
- Ascochyta atraphaxis
- Ascochyta atriplicis Died. (1904)
- Ascochyta atropae
- Ascochyta atropunctata
- Ascochyta aucubae
- Ascochyta aucubicola
- Ascochyta australis
- Ascochyta avenae (Petr.) R. Sprague & Aar.G. Johnson (1948)
- Ascochyta axyridis Deeva (1968)

== B ==
- Ascochyta babajaniae Tasl. (1967)
- Ascochyta babylonica H.C. Greene (1964)
- Ascochyta baccae
- Ascochyta baccharidis
- Ascochyta baccicola
- Ascochyta bacilligera
- Ascochyta bacteriiformis
- Ascochyta balansae
- Ascochyta ballotina I.E. Brezhnev (1961)
- Ascochyta balsamita Tasl. (1967)
- Ascochyta bambusicola Gonz. Frag. (1925)
- Ascochyta bambusina V.G. Rao (1963)
- Ascochyta banosensis Syd. & P. Syd. (1916)
- Ascochyta baptisiae Davis (1926)
- Ascochyta basellae Henn. (1902)
- Ascochyta batatae
- Ascochyta batatas Khokhr. & Dyur. (1934)
- Ascochyta bataticola Khokhr. & Dyur. (1934)
- Ascochyta bauhiniae
- Ascochyta baumgartneri Petr. (1955)
- Ascochyta begoniae (Tassi) Voglino (1913)
- Ascochyta benningiorum Hern.-Restr., L.W. Hou, L. Cai & Crous (2020)
- Ascochyta berberidina
- Ascochyta berberidis E. Rădul. & Negru (1964)
- Ascochyta betae
- Ascochyta beticola
- Ascochyta betonicae Siemaszko (1919)
- Ascochyta betonicicola Simonyan & Melnik (1970)
- Ascochyta betulae
- Ascochyta betulina Vasyag. (1968)
- Ascochyta bidentis Cejp & Dolejš (1973)
- Ascochyta bieniaszii Rouppert (1912)
- Ascochyta biforae Bond.-Mont. (1945)
- Ascochyta bignoniae Kamal, R.P. Singh & P. Kumar (1980)
- Ascochyta biguttulata E.Y. Daniels (1927)
- Ascochyta boehmeriae Woron. (1924)
- Ascochyta boeremae L.W. Hou, Crous & L. Cai (2017)
- Ascochyta boerhaaviae
- Ascochyta boerhaviae Tharp (1917)
- Ascochyta bohemica Kabát & Bubák (1905)
- Ascochyta boltshauseri Sacc. (1891)
- Ascochyta bombacacearum A.N. Rai & Kamal (1992)
- Ascochyta bombacina A. Mehrotra, M.D. Mehrotra & M. Basu (2004)
- Ascochyta bombycina Penz. & Sacc. (1904)
- Ascochyta bondarceviana Melnik (1975)
- Ascochyta bondarzewii
- Ascochyta boni-henrici Ranoj. (1914)
- Ascochyta boopidis Tassi (1901)
- Ascochyta boraginis I.E. Brezhnev (1939)
- Ascochyta borjomi Bondartsev (1912)
- Ascochyta bornmuelleri Syd. & P. Syd. (1917)
- Ascochyta boutelouae Fairm. (1918)
- Ascochyta boydii Grove (1918)
- Ascochyta brachypodii (Syd. & P. Syd.) R. Sprague & Aar.G. Johnson (1950)
- Ascochyta brassicae-campestris Sawada (1958)
- Ascochyta brassicae-junceae
- Ascochyta brassicae-rapae Bond.-Mont. (1923)
- Ascochyta brassicae Thüm. (1879)
- Ascochyta bresadolae
- Ascochyta brunnea
- Ascochyta bryoniae Kabát & Bubák (1904)
- Ascochyta bryophila (A. Racov.) Melnik (1972)
- Ascochyta bubakiana
- Ascochyta bufoniae Gonz. Frag. (1920)
- Ascochyta bulgarica Bubák & Picb. (1937)
- Ascochyta buniadis
- Ascochyta bupleuri
- Ascochyta butleri (Died.) Punith. (1979)
- Ascochyta buxicola Hollós (1926)
- Ascochyta buxina

== C ==
- Ascochyta caiophorae Henn. (1900)
- Ascochyta cakiles H. Ruppr. (1959)
- Ascochyta calamagrostidis
- Ascochyta calami (Bres.) Punith. (1988)
- Ascochyta calendulae Syd. (1935)
- Ascochyta callistea H. Ruppr. (1958)
- Ascochyta calpurniae
- Ascochyta calycanthi
- Ascochyta calystegiae Sacc. (1878)
- Ascochyta camelliae
- Ascochyta campanulae Garb. (1924)
- Ascochyta camphorae Turconi (1908)
- Ascochyta candelariellicola D. Hawksw. & Kalb (1992)
- Ascochyta cannabis
- Ascochyta cannae Rangel (1915)
- Ascochyta capparidis
- Ascochyta capparis
- Ascochyta capsici
- Ascochyta caraganae (Vestergr.) Melnik (1975)
- Ascochyta cardiacae Dobrov. (1914)
- Ascochyta caricae-papayae
- Ascochyta caricae Rabenh. (1851)
- Ascochyta caricicola Melnik (1975)
- Ascochyta caricina
- Ascochyta caricis-arenariae Melnik (1967)
- Ascochyta caricis-hebridensis Punith. (1988)
- Ascochyta caricis-ripariae Punith. (1988)
- Ascochyta caricis
- Ascochyta carinthiaca Jaap (1908)
- Ascochyta carpathica (Allesch.) Keissl. (1922)
- Ascochyta carpinea Sacc. (1878)
- Ascochyta carpogena
- Ascochyta carthagenensis
- Ascochyta carthami Khokhr. (1970)
- Ascochyta carvi Ondřej (1983)
- Ascochyta caryae H.C. Greene (1964)
- Ascochyta caryoticola Punith. (1988)
- Ascochyta caryotina G.V. Rao (1962)
- Ascochyta cassandrae
- Ascochyta cassiae
- Ascochyta catabrosae Unamuno (1942)
- Ascochyta catalpae Tassi (1900)
- Ascochyta caulicola Laubert (1903)
- Ascochyta cauligena
- Ascochyta caulina (P. Karst.) Aa & Kesteren (1979)
- Ascochyta caulium
- Ascochyta celosiae (Thüm.) Petr. (1927)
- Ascochyta celtidis Hollós (1929)
- Ascochyta cenchricola Speg. (1914)
- Ascochyta cephalanthi
- Ascochyta cerastii-pumili Unamuno (1929)
- Ascochyta ceratocarpi Golovin (1950)
- Ascochyta cerinthes Lobik (1928)
- Ascochyta chaerophylli
- Ascochyta charieidis Novoss. (1938)
- Ascochyta chartarum
- Ascochyta charticola
- Ascochyta cheiranthi Bres. (1900)
- Ascochyta chelidonii
- Ascochyta chelidoniicola Melnik (1975)
- Ascochyta chenopodii Rostr. (1905)
- Ascochyta chenopodiicola Pisareva (1968)
- Ascochyta cherimoliae
- Ascochyta chlianthi
- Ascochyta chlorae
- Ascochyta chlorospora
- Ascochyta chochrjakovii
- Ascochyta chrysanthemi
- Ascochyta cicadina
- Ascochyta cichorii Died. (1912)
- Ascochyta ciliolata
- Ascochyta cinchonae Melnik (1968)
- Ascochyta cinerariae
- Ascochyta cinerea
- Ascochyta cinnamomi S.Q. Chen & P.K. Chi (1994)
- Ascochyta circaeae Bubák & Picb. (1937)
- Ascochyta cirsii Died. (1912)
- Ascochyta cissi N. Naito (1940)
- Ascochyta citri
- Ascochyta citricola
- Ascochyta citrullina
- Ascochyta cladrastidis Kabát & Bubák (1912)
- Ascochyta clematidina
- Ascochyta clinopodiicola D. Pem, Camporesi & K.D. Hyde (2018)
- Ascochyta clianthi
- Ascochyta cliviae Magnaghi (1902)
- Ascochyta cocoes-australis Punith. (1988)
- Ascochyta cocoes-capitatae Caball. (1941)
- Ascochyta cocoina Gonz. Frag. (1917)
- Ascochyta codonopsidis Schwarzman (1968)
- Ascochyta codonopsis
- Ascochyta coffeae
- Ascochyta colchica
- Ascochyta colebrookeae Pandotra & Ganguly (1964)
- Ascochyta colocasiae-esculentae Punith. & Peregrine (1988)
- Ascochyta colorata
- Ascochyta columnaris
- Ascochyta coluteae
- Ascochyta coluteaecola
- Ascochyta coluteicola Gonz. Frag. ex Trotter (1931)
- Ascochyta commiphorae T.S. Ramakr. & Sundaram (1955)
- Ascochyta comocladiae Gonz. Frag. & Cif. (1928)
- Ascochyta compositarum Davis (1919)
- Ascochyta compta
- Ascochyta confusa Ellis & Everh. (1904)
- Ascochyta conicola
- Ascochyta conorum Henn. (1904)
- Ascochyta controversa Punith. (1979)
- Ascochyta contubernalis
- Ascochyta convolvuli
- Ascochyta cookei
- Ascochyta corchori Hara (1925)
- Ascochyta corchoricola Khokhr. (1933)
- Ascochyta coreopsidis Moesz & Smarods (1937)
- Ascochyta cornicola
- Ascochyta coronaria
- Ascochyta coronariae
- Ascochyta coronillae M.I. Nikol. (1970)
- Ascochyta coronillae-emeri Wanas., Camporesi, E.B.G. Jones & K.D. Hyde (2018)
- Ascochyta corticola McAlpine (1899)
- Ascochyta coryli
- Ascochyta cotyledonis H. Zimm. (1909)
- Ascochyta crambes Novoss. (1938)
- Ascochyta crambicola Melnik (1967)
- Ascochyta crataegi
- Ascochyta crataegicola
- Ascochyta cretensis B. Sutton (1996)
- Ascochyta cruris-galli
- Ascochyta crus-galli
- Ascochyta cryptostemmatis McAlpine (1903)
- Ascochyta crystallina McAlpine (1902)
- Ascochyta crytostemmatis
- Ascochyta cucumeris Fautrey & Roum. (1891)
- Ascochyta cucumis
- Ascochyta culmicola (S. Ahmad) Punith. (1979)
- Ascochyta cuneomaculata H.C. Greene (1964)
- Ascochyta cyani Cruchet (1909)
- Ascochyta cyathulae Chona & Munjal (1950)
- Ascochyta cycadicola Punith. (1988)
- Ascochyta cycadina Scalia (1902)
- Ascochyta cyclaminis
- Ascochyta cymbopogonis Punith. (1979)
- Ascochyta cynarae Maffei (1909)
- Ascochyta cynodontis Unamuno (1929)
- Ascochyta cynosuricola Punith. (1979)
- Ascochyta cyperi-ochracei Punith. (1988)
- Ascochyta cypericola R.K. Upadhyay, Kenfield, Strobel & W.M. Hess (1991)
- Ascochyta cyperiphthora Pomella & R.W. Barreto (1997)
- Ascochyta cyphomandrae Petch (1922)
- Ascochyta cypripedii
- Ascochyta cytisi Lib. (1832)

== D ==
- Ascochyta dahliicola (Brunaud) Petr. (1927)
- Ascochyta daphnes Höhn. (1924)
- Ascochyta daturae Sacc. (1878)
- Ascochyta daturicola Bres. (1926)
- Ascochyta davidiana Kabát & Bubák (1904)
- Ascochyta davidii Tasl. (1967)
- Ascochyta decipiens
- Ascochyta deformis (P. Karst.) P.K. Buchanan (1987)
- Ascochyta delphinii Melnik (1968)
- Ascochyta dendrostellerae Schwarzman (1961)
- Ascochyta densiuscula
- Ascochyta dentariae I.E. Brezhnev (1951)
- Ascochyta desmazieri
- Ascochyta destructiva Kabát & Bubák (1903)
- Ascochyta deutziae Bres. (1900)
- Ascochyta dianthi
- Ascochyta diapensiae
- Ascochyta dicentrae Oudem. (1902)
- Ascochyta dichrocephalae
- Ascochyta dictamni Krusch. (1959)
- Ascochyta diedickei Staritz (1913)
- Ascochyta diervillae Kabát & Bubák (1907)
- Ascochyta difformis Punith. (1979)
- Ascochyta digitalina Vanev & Bakalova (1989)
- Ascochyta digitalis
- Ascochyta digraphidis
- Ascochyta dioscoreae Syd. & P. Syd. (1916)
- Ascochyta diplodina
- Ascochyta diplodinoides
- Ascochyta dipsaci Bubák (1909)
- Ascochyta dolichi Gonz. Frag. (1924)
- Ascochyta dolomitica
- Ascochyta donacina
- Ascochyta doronici Allesch. (1897)
- Ascochyta dorycnii (Petr.) P.K. Buchanan (1987)
- Ascochyta drabae
- Ascochyta dracaenicola (Sacc.) Allesch. (1900)
- Ascochyta ducis-aprutii Mattir. (1903)
- Ascochyta ducometii Fourmont (1938)
- Ascochyta dulcamarae Bubák (1907)

== E ==
- Ascochyta ebeleki Kalymb. (1968)
- Ascochyta ebuli
- Ascochyta echii Mítítíuc & Manoliu (1976)
- Ascochyta echinopis Bond.-Mont. (1945)
- Ascochyta effusa
- Ascochyta elaeagni
- Ascochyta elaterii
- Ascochyta eleagni
- Ascochyta elegans Punith. (1979)
- Ascochyta elephas Bubák & Kabát (1904)
- Ascochyta ellipsospora Vouaux (1910)
- Ascochyta ellisii
- Ascochyta elsholtziae Bondartsev (1921)
- Ascochyta elymi Tehon & E.Y. Daniels (1927)
- Ascochyta emeri
- Ascochyta epilobii
- Ascochyta equiseti (Desm.) Grove (1918)
- Ascochyta erevanica Teterevn.-Babajan & Simonyan (1964)
- Ascochyta eriobotryae Voglino (1908)
- Ascochyta ervicola
- Ascochyta erythrinae Elisei (1938)
- Ascochyta erythronii
- Ascochyta euonymella
- Ascochyta euonymi
- Ascochyta euonymicola
- Ascochyta euphorbiae
- Ascochyta euphrasiae
- Ascochyta evonymi
- Ascochyta exochordae Bil'der (2006)
- Ascochyta exochordi

== F ==
- Ascochyta fabae
- Ascochyta fagi Woron. (1913)
- Ascochyta fagopyri
- Ascochyta farfarae Siemaszko (1919)
- Ascochyta ferdinandi Bubák & Malkoff (1908)
- Ascochyta fernandi
- Ascochyta ferrarisiana Casali (1901)
- Ascochyta ferulae
- Ascochyta festucae-erectae Henn. (1906)
- Ascochyta festucae Punith. (1979)
- Ascochyta feuilleauboisiana
- Ascochyta fibricola
- Ascochyta fibriseda
- Ascochyta ficus Traverso & Spessa (1910)
- Ascochyta foeniculina McAlpine (1904)
- Ascochyta foliicola (Gonz. Frag.) Melnik (1975)
- Ascochyta folliculorum
- Ascochyta forsythiae
- Ascochyta fragariae
- Ascochyta fragariicola L. Bertram (1937)
- Ascochyta fragosoi Unamuno (1921)
- Ascochyta frangulina Kabát & Bubák (1903)
- Ascochyta fraserae
- Ascochyta frasericola Melnik (1971)
- Ascochyta fraseriicola
- Ascochyta fraxini
- Ascochyta fraxinicola Brunaud (1888)
- Ascochyta fraxinifolia Siemaszko (1923)
- Ascochyta fremontiae
- Ascochyta fructigena Dominik (1936)
- Ascochyta fumariae Hollós (1908)
- Ascochyta funckiae
- Ascochyta funkiae-sieboldianae Punith. (1988)
- Ascochyta fuscescens Kabát & Bubák (1904)
- Ascochyta fuscopapillata Bubák & Dearn. (1916)

== G ==
- Ascochyta gaillardiae Mítítíuc & Manoliu (1976)
- Ascochyta galatellae Nevod. & Byzova (1968)
- Ascochyta galegae
- Ascochyta galeopsidis
- Ascochyta galii-aristati Gonz. Frag. ex Trotter (1931)
- Ascochyta galii
- Ascochyta garciniae Z.D. Jiang & P.K. Chi (1994)
- Ascochyta gardeniae P.K. Chi (1994)
- Ascochyta garhwalensis
- Ascochyta garrettiana Syd. & P. Syd. (1905)
- Ascochyta garryae Sacc. (1880)
- Ascochyta gaultheriae Koval (1962)
- Ascochyta gei Vanev & Bakalova (1996)
- Ascochyta georgica Melnik (1970)
- Ascochyta geranii
- Ascochyta geraniicola Siemaszko (1923)
- Ascochyta gerberae Maffei (1913)
- Ascochyta githaginis Hollós (1926)
- Ascochyta gladioli Traverso & Spessa (1910)
- Ascochyta glaucii (Cooke & Massee) Died. (1912)
- Ascochyta glechomae Bondartsev (1921)
- Ascochyta glechomatis
- Ascochyta glycyrrhizae Vasyag. (1964)
- Ascochyta godetiae Riedl (1966)
- Ascochyta goebeliae Byzova & Pisareva (1968)
- Ascochyta gorakhpurensis Kamal, R.P. Singh & P. Kumar (1980)
- Ascochyta gorlenkoi Melnik (1978)
- Ascochyta gossypii
- Ascochyta gossypiicola Bedlan (2016)
- Ascochyta grabowskiae Tassi (1901)
- Ascochyta gracilispora Punith. (1979)
- Ascochyta graminea (Sacc.) R. Sprague & Aar.G. Johnson (1950)
- Ascochyta graminicola subsp. graminicola
- Ascochyta graminicola Sacc. (1878)
- Ascochyta graminum
- Ascochyta grandimaculans Kabát & Bubák (1907)
- Ascochyta grandispora Kabát & Bubák (1908)
- Ascochyta greenei Melnik (1975)
- Ascochyta grewiae Cejp (1971)
- Ascochyta grossulariae
- Ascochyta grovei
- Ascochyta guaranitica

== H ==
- Ascochyta halimodendri Murashk. (1924)
- Ascochyta haloxyli (Syd. & P. Syd.) Jacz. (1917)
- Ascochyta hanseni
- Ascochyta hansenii
- Ascochyta haworthiae
- Ascochyta helianthi
- Ascochyta hellebori
- Ascochyta helosciadii (Fautrey & Lambotte) Petr. (1953)
- Ascochyta hemipteleae Melnik (1970)
- Ascochyta hepaticae Died. (1912
- Ascochyta heraclei
- Ascochyta herbicola (Wehm.) Qian Chen & L. Cai (2015)
- Ascochyta herreana Henn. & Staritz (1906)
- Ascochyta hesperidearum
- Ascochyta hesperidis Died. (1912)
- Ascochyta heterodendri Hansf. (1954)
- Ascochyta heteromorpha
- Ascochyta heterophragmia
- Ascochyta heveae Petch (1917)
- Ascochyta heveana Saccas (1953)
- Ascochyta hibisci-cannabini Khokhr. (1933)
- Ascochyta hieracii
- Ascochyta hieraciicola Moesz & Smarods (1941)
- Ascochyta hierochloae Punith. (1979)
- Ascochyta himalayensis J.N. Rai, Saxsena & J.P. Tewari (1972)
- Ascochyta hippocastani
- Ascochyta hoatoaum
- Ascochyta holci
- Ascochyta homogynes Ranoj. (1914)
- Ascochyta hordei Hara (1930)
- Ascochyta hordeicola Punith. (1979)
- Ascochyta hortensis
- Ascochyta hortorum
- Ascochyta hoveniae Sawada (1958)
- Ascochyta humuli
- Ascochyta humuliphila Melnik (1971)
- Ascochyta hupkei H. Ruppr. (1958)
- Ascochyta hyacinthi
- Ascochyta hyalospora (Cooke & Ellis) Boerema, S.B. Mathur & Neerg. (1977)
- Ascochyta hydnocarpi S.M. Lin & P.K. Chi (1994)
- Ascochyta hydrangeae M.A. Arnaud & G. Arnaud (1924)
- Ascochyta hydrophylli-virginiana H.C. Greene (1949)
- Ascochyta hydrophylli R. Sprague (1937)
- Ascochyta hyoscyami P.K. Chi (1966)
- Ascochyta hyoscyamicola
- Ascochyta hyperici
- Ascochyta hypochaeridis
- Ascochyta hypochoeridis
- Ascochyta hypophylla N.D. Sharma (1976)

== I ==
- Ascochyta idaei
- Ascochyta ignobilis
- Ascochyta ilicia
- Ascochyta ilicicola Politis (1949)
- Ascochyta ilicis Grove (1935)
- Ascochyta impatiens
- Ascochyta impatientis Bres. (1900)
- Ascochyta imperatae Punith. (1979)
- Ascochyta imperfecta
- Ascochyta indusiata
- Ascochyta infortunata T.S. Ramakr. (1951)
- Ascochyta infuscans Ellis & Everh. (1889)
- Ascochyta inulae (Allesch.) Petr. (1921)
- Ascochyta inulicola Petr. (1921)
- Ascochyta iridis-pseudacori Punith. (1988)
- Ascochyta iridis Oudem. (1889)
- Ascochyta irpina Sacc. & Trotter (1920)
- Ascochyta irregularispora Matsush. (2003)
- Ascochyta ischaemi
- Ascochyta italica (Traverso) Ishiy. (1936)
- Ascochyta ixorae

== J ==
- Ascochyta jaapi Sacc. (1931)
- Ascochyta jaapii
- Ascochyta jaczevskii Negru & Vlad (1962)
- Ascochyta jahniana
- Ascochyta jasminicola Canonaco (1936)
- Ascochyta jenissensis
- Ascochyta juelii Bubák (1909)
- Ascochyta juglandis Boltsh. (1898)
- Ascochyta julibrissin
- Ascochyta junci (Oudem.) Melnik (1975)

== K ==
- Ascochyta kabati-bubaki Săvul. & Sandu (1935)
- Ascochyta kabatiana Trotter (1931)
- Ascochyta kalcevii Bubák (1909)
- Ascochyta kalymbetovii Shirn.-Grish. (1977)
- Ascochyta kamchatica M.M. Gomzhina & E.L. Gasich (2020)
- Ascochyta kashmeriana
- Ascochyta kashmiriana Padwick & Mehr (1943)
- Ascochyta kazachstanica (Byzova) Punith. (1979)
- Ascochyta kentiae Maubl. (1903)
- Ascochyta kerguelensis Henn. (1906)
- Ascochyta kirulisii H. Ruppr. (1959)
- Ascochyta kleinii Bubák (1907)
- Ascochyta koelreuteriae Hollós (1928)
- Ascochyta koolunga (J.A. Davidson, D. Hartley, Priest, S. Kaczm., Herdina, A. McKay & E.S. Scott) L.W. Hou, L. Cai & Crous (2020)
- Ascochyta kuhniae H.C. Greene (1964)
- Ascochyta kurdistanica Bubák (1914)

== L ==
- Ascochyta labiatarum Bres. (1900)
- Ascochyta lablab M.I. Nikol. (1970)
- Ascochyta laburni
- Ascochyta laconitiana
- Ascochyta lactucae
- Ascochyta lacustris
- Ascochyta lagenaeformis
- Ascochyta lageniformis Caball. (1941)
- Ascochyta lagerstroemiae Chowdhry & D. Gupta (1985)
- Ascochyta lagochili Byzova (1968)
- Ascochyta lallemantiae Žerbele (1972)
- Ascochyta lamiorum Sacc. (1878)
- Ascochyta lantanae
- Ascochyta lappae Kabát & Bubák (1908)
- Ascochyta laricina Voglino (1913)
- Ascochyta laskarisii Melnik (1973)
- Ascochyta lathyri Trail (1887)
- Ascochyta lathyrina Hollós (1926)
- Ascochyta latvica Syd. (1935)
- Ascochyta laurina
- Ascochyta laurocerasi Gutner (1933)
- Ascochyta ledi
- Ascochyta ledicola Oudem. (1901)
- Ascochyta leguminum
- Ascochyta lentis
- Ascochyta leonuri
- Ascochyta leonuricola Shirn.-Grish. (1976)
- Ascochyta lepidii Hollós (1908)
- Ascochyta leptospora (Trail) Hara (1918)
- Ascochyta lethalis
- Ascochyta levistici (Lebedeva) Melnik (1975)
- Ascochyta libanotidis Lebedeva (1922)
- Ascochyta lichenoides
- Ascochyta ligulariae Kalymb. (1962)
- Ascochyta ligustri Sacc. & Speg. (1878)
- Ascochyta ligustrina
- Ascochyta limbalis
- Ascochyta linariae Bond.-Mont. (1924)
- Ascochyta lini Rostr. (1901)
- Ascochyta linicola
- Ascochyta liriodendri Woron. (1915)
- Ascochyta lobeliae Petch (1922)
- Ascochyta lobikii Melnik (1975)
- Ascochyta lolii (H. Zimm.) R. Sprague & H.W. Johnson (1942)
- Ascochyta lomatii W.B. Cooke (1952)
- Ascochyta londonensis Bubák & Dearn. (1916)
- Ascochyta longan Chuan F. Zhang & P.K. Chi (1996)
- Ascochyta lonicerae-canadensis H.C. Greene (1961)
- Ascochyta lophanthi Davis (1903)
- Ascochyta lorentzii
- Ascochyta lucumae (Henn.) Wollenw. (1916)
- Ascochyta ludwigiana (Petr.) P.K. Buchanan (1987)
- Ascochyta ludwigii H. Ruppr. (1958)
- Ascochyta lunariae Syd. (1934)
- Ascochyta lupini
- Ascochyta lupinicola Petr. (1921)
- Ascochyta luscopapillata
- Ascochyta luzulae-divaricatae Punith. (1988)
- Ascochyta luzulicola R. Sprague (1962)
- Ascochyta lychnidis
- Ascochyta lycii
- Ascochyta lycopersici
- Ascochyta lysimachiae

== M ==
- Ascochyta maackiae J.D. Sun & J.K. Bai (1995)
- Ascochyta mabiana Sacc. (1910)
- Ascochyta macrospora
- Ascochyta maculans
- Ascochyta madisonensis H.C. Greene (1959)
- Ascochyta magnoliae
- Ascochyta majalis C. Massal. (1900)
- Ascochyta mali Ellis & Everh. (1900)
- Ascochyta malvacearum
- Ascochyta malvae H. Zimm. (1909)
- Ascochyta malvarum
- Ascochyta malvicola Sacc. (1878)
- Ascochyta manawaorae Verkley, Woudenb. & Gruyter (2010)
- Ascochyta mangiferae
- Ascochyta manihotis Henn. (1903)
- Ascochyta marantaceae Rangel (1915)
- Ascochyta marchantiae
- Ascochyta marginata Davis (1915)
- Ascochyta marssonia (Siemaszko) Melnik (1975)
- Ascochyta martianoffiana
- Ascochyta massaeana
- Ascochyta matricariae (Moesz & Smarods) Grove (1935)
- Ascochyta matritensis Alcalde (1945)
- Ascochyta matthiolae
- Ascochyta maydis G.L. Stout (1930)
- Ascochyta medicaginicola var. macrospora
- Ascochyta medicaginicola Qian Chen & L. Cai (2015)
- Ascochyta medicaginis
- Ascochyta melicae (Died.) Melnik (1975)
- Ascochyta meliloti Trusova (1915)
- Ascochyta melissae Marchal & Sternon (1923)
- Ascochyta melongenae Padman. (1947)
- Ascochyta melonis
- Ascochyta menthicola Ishiy. (1936)
- Ascochyta menyanthes
- Ascochyta menyanthicola Melnik (1975)
- Ascochyta menyanthis
- Ascochyta menziesii
- Ascochyta mercurialina
- Ascochyta mercurialis
- Ascochyta mespili
- Ascochyta metulispora Berk. & Broome (1878)
- Ascochyta microspora Trail (1887)
- Ascochyta millefolii
- Ascochyta mimuli A.L. Sm. & Ramsb. (1915)
- Ascochyta minima (P. Karst. & Har.) Arx (1957)
- Ascochyta miniquadriguttulata Punith. (1988)
- Ascochyta minor (R. Sprague) Punith. (1979)
- Ascochyta minutissima
- Ascochyta misera
- Ascochyta missouriensis R. Sprague & Aar.G. Johnson (1950)
- Ascochyta miurae Hara (1918)
- Ascochyta miurai
- Ascochyta miyakei Tanaka (1918)
- Ascochyta moellendorfii Ruhland (1901)
- Ascochyta moelleriana
- Ascochyta moeszii Smarods (1942)
- Ascochyta monardae Klaptzova (1941)
- Ascochyta montenegrina Bubák (1903)
- Ascochyta moravica (Petr.) P.K. Buchanan (1987)
- Ascochyta mori
- Ascochyta moricola
- Ascochyta morifolia Sawada (1919)
- Ascochyta mulgedii Cejp (1968)
- Ascochyta murrayae
- Ascochyta muscorum (Gonz. Frag.) Melnik (1972)
- Ascochyta mycoparasitica Cartwr. & R.K. Webster (1997)
- Ascochyta myrticola Maire & Sacc. (1902)
- Ascochyta myrtilli

== N ==
- Ascochyta nagrajii N.D. Sharma (1982)
- Ascochyta natsume Hara (1928)
- Ascochyta nebulosa Sacc. & Berl. (1889)
- Ascochyta necans
- Ascochyta negundinis Bres. (1926)
- Ascochyta neopisi W.J. Li, Camporesi & K.D. Hyde (2020)
- Ascochyta nepalensis Punith. (1979)
- Ascochyta nepetae Davis (1919)
- Ascochyta nepeticola
- Ascochyta nicandrae J.D. Sun & J.K. Bai (1995)
- Ascochyta nicotianae
- Ascochyta nigripycnidia (Boerema, Gruyter & Noordel.) Qian Chen & L. Cai (2015)
- Ascochyta nigripycnidicola
- Ascochyta nigripycnidiicola
- Ascochyta nobilis
- Ascochyta nyctanthis V.P. Sahni (1968)
- Ascochyta nymphaeae

== O ==
- Ascochyta obducens
- Ascochyta obiones
- Ascochyta oleae Scalia (1900)
- Ascochyta oleandri
- Ascochyta oleracea J.W. Ellis (1916)
- Ascochyta oliviae
- Ascochyta onobrychidis Bond.-Mont. (1940)
- Ascochyta ontariensis
- Ascochyta opuli Oudem. (1894)
- Ascochyta opuntiae
- Ascochyta orchidis
- Ascochyta oreodaphnes
- Ascochyta oreoselini
- Ascochyta orientalis Bondartsev (1906)
- Ascochyta orni
- Ascochyta ornithopi Bond.-Mont. (1945)
- Ascochyta oro Viégas (1945)
- Ascochyta orobanches
- Ascochyta orobi Sacc. (1878)
- Ascochyta orobicola Trusova (1915)
- Ascochyta oryzae
- Ascochyta oryzina Hara (1918)
- Ascochyta osmaroniae (Dearn.) Arx (1957)
- Ascochyta osmophila
- Ascochyta osmundae H.C. Greene (1963)
- Ascochyta osmundicola Punith. (1988)
- Ascochyta oudemansii Sacc. & P. Syd. (1899)
- Ascochyta ovalispora McAlpine (1902)
- Ascochyta oxybaphi
- Ascochyta oxycocci
- Ascochyta oxyspora Tassi (1900)
- Ascochyta oxytropidis
- Ascochyta oxytropis J. Schröt. (1887)

== P ==
- Ascochyta pachyphragmae Lobik (1928)
- Ascochyta padi
- Ascochyta paeoniae Bond.-Mont. (1946)
- Ascochyta paliuri
- Ascochyta pallida Kabát & Bubák (1908)
- Ascochyta pallor
- Ascochyta palmicola Punith. (1988)
- Ascochyta panacis Melnik (1972)
- Ascochyta papaveris
- Ascochyta papyricola
- Ascochyta parasitica
- Ascochyta parietariae
- Ascochyta paspali (Syd.) Punith. (1979)
- Ascochyta passeriniana Died. (1915)
- Ascochyta passiflorae
- Ascochyta patagonica
- Ascochyta patriniae Bond.-Mont. (1938)
- Ascochyta paucisporula R. Sprague (1962)
- Ascochyta paulowniae
- Ascochyta pedemontana Ferraris (1902)
- Ascochyta pedicularidis
- Ascochyta pedicularis (Rostr.) Arx (1957)
- Ascochyta pegani S. Ahmad (1971)
- Ascochyta pellucida Bubák (1906)
- Ascochyta peperomiae J.M. Pereira & R.W. Barreto (2002)
- Ascochyta perforans
- Ascochyta pergulariae Pandotra & K.S.M. Sastry (1969)
- Ascochyta periclymeni
- Ascochyta perillae P.K. Chi (1966)
- Ascochyta periplocae Kabát & Bubák (1907)
- Ascochyta petasitidis Petr. (1925)
- Ascochyta petrakii
- Ascochyta petroselini
- Ascochyta petuniae
- Ascochyta phacae (Corbaz) Qian Chen & L. Cai (2015)
- Ascochyta phaseolorum
- Ascochyta phellodendri Kabát & Bubák (1907)
- Ascochyta philadelphi Sacc. & Speg. (1878)
- Ascochyta philodendri Bat. (1954)
- Ascochyta phleina
- Ascochyta phlogina
- Ascochyta phlogis Voglino (1908)
- Ascochyta phlomidicola P.K. Buchanan (1987)
- Ascochyta phlomidis Bubák & Wróbl. (1916)
- Ascochyta phomoides
- Ascochyta phyllachoroides
- Ascochyta phyllidis Jørst. (1962)
- Ascochyta phyllostictoides (Desm.) Keissl. (1923)
- Ascochyta physalicola
- Ascochyta physalidicola Oudem. (1902)
- Ascochyta physalina
- Ascochyta phytolaccae Sacc. & Scalia (1903)
- Ascochyta pilocarpi Tassi (1901)
- Ascochyta pilosella L.W. Hou, L. Cai & Crous (2020)
- Ascochyta piniperda
- Ascochyta pinodella
- Ascochyta pinodes
- Ascochyta pinzolensis Kabát & Bubák (1905)
- Ascochyta piperina Syd. (1939)
- Ascochyta piricola
- Ascochyta pisarum Y.S. Paul & Rathour (1998)
- Ascochyta pisi
- Ascochyta pisicola
- Ascochyta plantaginella Tehon (1933)
- Ascochyta plantaginicola Melnik (1970)
- Ascochyta plantaginis
- Ascochyta plumbaginicola
- Ascochyta plumbaginis
- Ascochyta plumeriae Henn. (1908)
- Ascochyta poacearum A.N. Rai & Kamal (1992)
- Ascochyta poae-badensis Picb. (1931)
- Ascochyta poagena Punith. (1979)
- Ascochyta podagrariae
- Ascochyta polemonii Cavara (1899)
- Ascochyta polygoni-setosi (Bubák) Melnik (1971)
- Ascochyta polygoni (Dearn. & House) Arx (1957)
- Ascochyta polygonicola Kabát & Bubák (1907)
- Ascochyta poonensis Punith. (1988)
- Ascochyta populi
- Ascochyta populicola Kabát & Bubák (1908)
- Ascochyta populina
- Ascochyta populorum (Sacc. & Roum.) Voglino (1912)
- Ascochyta portulacae Shirn.-Grish. (1976)
- Ascochyta potentillarum
- Ascochyta prasadii D.D. Shukla & V.N. Pathak (1968)
- Ascochyta premilcurensis (Tibpromma, Camporesi & K.D. Hyde) Qian Chen, Crous & L. Cai (2017)
- Ascochyta primulae Trail (1887)
- Ascochyta procenkoi Melnik (1967)
- Ascochyta prosopidicola
- Ascochyta pruni Kabát & Bubák (1908)
- Ascochyta prunicola P.K. Chi (1966)
- Ascochyta psammae Oudem. (1901)
- Ascochyta pseudacori Oudem. (1900)
- Ascochyta psoraleae
- Ascochyta psorlareae P.K. Chi (1966)
- Ascochyta pteleae Bubák & Kabát (1912)
- Ascochyta pteridis Bres. (1894)
- Ascochyta pterophila
- Ascochyta pucciniophila
- Ascochyta puiggarii
- Ascochyta pulcherrima Sohi, S.L. Sharma, S.K. Nayar & Shayam (1973)
- Ascochyta pulmonariae
- Ascochyta punctata Naumov (1913)
- Ascochyta pyrethri Brunaud & Malbr. (1887)
- Ascochyta pyricola Sacc. (1875)
- Ascochyta pyrina Peglion (1894)

== Q ==
- Ascochyta quadriguttulata Kabát & Bubák (1910)
- Ascochyta quercicola
- Ascochyta quercus-ilicis Güssow (1908)
- Ascochyta quercus
- Ascochyta quercuum

== R ==
- Ascochyta rabiei
- Ascochyta rachidicola
- Ascochyta rafiae Tassi (1901)
- Ascochyta ramischiae Vasyag. (1964)
- Ascochyta ranunculi
- Ascochyta raphiae
- Ascochyta raworthiae Trinchieri (1909)
- Ascochyta resedae Bond.-Mont. (1923)
- Ascochyta reynoutriae Sawada (1958)
- Ascochyta rhachidicola (Bubák) Bondartsev & Bond.-Mont. (1952)
- Ascochyta rhagadioli Khokhr. (1951)
- Ascochyta rhagodiae Gonz. Frag. ex E.K. Cash (1972)
- Ascochyta rhamni Lebedeva (1922)
- Ascochyta rheae (Cooke) Grove (1920)
- Ascochyta rhei
- Ascochyta rheicola Sawada (1958)
- Ascochyta rhodesii Punith. (1979)
- Ascochyta rhododendri Lind (1913)
- Ascochyta rhodotypi
- Ascochyta rhynchosiae
- Ascochyta rhynchosporae
- Ascochyta ribesia Sacc. & Fautrey (1900)
- Ascochyta ribicola H.C. Greene (1958)
- Ascochyta ribis
- Ascochyta ricinella Sacc. & Scalia (1903)
- Ascochyta ricini (Rodigin) Melnik (1975)
- Ascochyta ricinicola P.K. Chi (1966)
- Ascochyta robiniae
- Ascochyta robiniicola Hollós (1907)
- Ascochyta roripae
- Ascochyta rorippae Dejeva (1968)
- Ascochyta rosae
- Ascochyta rosarum Tibpromma, Camporesi & K.D. Hyde (2017)
- Ascochyta rosicola
- Ascochyta rosmarini Tassi (1900)
- Ascochyta rostrupii Vestergr. (1902)
- Ascochyta roystoneae R.C. Srivast. (1982)
- Ascochyta roystoneicola Punith. (1988)
- Ascochyta rubi Lasch (1848)
- Ascochyta rubiae Bubák (1906)
- Ascochyta rubi-idaei Bedlan (2018)
- Ascochyta ruborum
- Ascochyta rudbeckae
- Ascochyta rudbeckiae Bond.-Mont. (1938)
- Ascochyta rufomaculans
- Ascochyta rumicicola Vasyag. (1968)
- Ascochyta rumicis-patientiae Picb. (1937)
- Ascochyta rusticana Kabát & Bubák (1910)

== S ==
- Ascochyta saccardiana
- Ascochyta saccardoana
- Ascochyta saccardoi Siemaszko (1923)
- Ascochyta sacchari Bat. ex Melnik (1972)
- Ascochyta saccharophila Punith. (1979)
- Ascochyta saginata
- Ascochyta salicicola
- Ascochyta salicifoliae
- Ascochyta salicina
- Ascochyta salicis Bonar (1946)
- Ascochyta salicorniae-patulae (Trotter) Melnik (1975)
- Ascochyta salicorniae
- Ascochyta salsolae
- Ascochyta sambucella
- Ascochyta sambuci
- Ascochyta saniculae Davis (1915)
- Ascochyta santali Thirum. & Naras. (1950)
- Ascochyta santessonii Alstrup & D. Hawksw. (1990)
- Ascochyta santolinae Gonz. Frag. (1914)
- Ascochyta saponariae
- Ascochyta sarmenticia
- Ascochyta sasae Hara (1931)
- Ascochyta savulescui Rădul. & Negru (1959)
- Ascochyta scabiosae Rabenh. (1854)
- Ascochyta scandens
- Ascochyta schelliana
- Ascochyta sclareae Sarwar (1977)
- Ascochyta sclerochloae Punith. (1979)
- Ascochyta scopoliae Kandinsk. (1971)
- Ascochyta scorzonerae Rostr. (1905)
- Ascochyta scotinospora Sousa da Câmara (1929)
- Ascochyta scrophulariae Kabát & Bubák (1908)
- Ascochyta scutellariae Bond.-Mont. (1945)
- Ascochyta securinegae Jenkina (1966)
- Ascochyta sedi-purpurei Rothers (1929)
- Ascochyta sedi
- Ascochyta selaginellae M.L. Farr (1968)
- Ascochyta semeles Sacc. (1908)
- Ascochyta sempervivi
- Ascochyta senecionicola Petr. (1924)
- Ascochyta senecionis Fuckel (1870)
- Ascochyta senensis Punith. (1988)
- Ascochyta senneniana Gonz. Frag. (1921)
- Ascochyta septentrionalis Fokin (1926)
- Ascochyta sesami Miura (1928)
- Ascochyta sesamicola P.K. Chi (1966)
- Ascochyta sesleriae C. Massal. (1914)
- Ascochyta shoreana Sacc. (1919)
- Ascochyta sicyi Novoss. (1938)
- Ascochyta sidae
- Ascochyta siemaszkoi Melnik (1975)
- Ascochyta sii
- Ascochyta silenes
- Ascochyta siliquaecola
- Ascochyta siliquastri
- Ascochyta siliquicola Unamuno (1923)
- Ascochyta silphii Bedlan (2015)
- Ascochyta simillima
- Ascochyta sinapis Rodigin (1956)
- Ascochyta siphonis Allesch. (1900)
- Ascochyta siraitia
- Ascochyta siraitiae F.X. Chao & P.K. Chi (1994)
- Ascochyta sisymbrii
- Ascochyta skagwayensis (R. Sprague) Punith. (1979)
- Ascochyta skimmiae S. Ahmad (1961)
- Ascochyta smilacigena Bubák & Dearn. (1916)
- Ascochyta smilacina
- Ascochyta smilacis-canadensis Punith. (1988)
- Ascochyta smilacis
- Ascochyta socia
- Ascochyta socialis
- Ascochyta sodalis
- Ascochyta sojae Miura (1928)
- Ascochyta sojicola
- Ascochyta sojina
- Ascochyta solani-nigri Died. (1903)
- Ascochyta solani-tuberosi Naumov (1925)
- Ascochyta solani
- Ascochyta solanicola Oudem. (1901)
- Ascochyta solidaginis
- Ascochyta solidaginum
- Ascochyta sonchi (Sacc.) Grove (1922)
- Ascochyta sonchina Lobik (1928)
- Ascochyta sophorae Allesch. (1897)
- Ascochyta sorbina Lobik (1928)
- Ascochyta sorghi Sacc. (1875)
- Ascochyta sorghina
- Ascochyta sorosii Melnik (1994)
- Ascochyta sparganii-ramosi Punith. (1988)
- Ascochyta sparganii
- Ascochyta spartinae
- Ascochyta sphaerophysae Barbarin (1917)
- Ascochyta sphaeropoda
- Ascochyta spinaciae Bond.-Mont. (1923)
- Ascochyta spinaciicola
- Ascochyta spiraeae
- Ascochyta spireae Kabát & Bubák (1908)
- Ascochyta spondiacearum
- Ascochyta sporoboli E. Castell. & Graniti (1950)
- Ascochyta spraguei
- Ascochyta staphyleae
- Ascochyta starcii Syd. (1932)
- Ascochyta statices Nagorny (1913)
- Ascochyta staticicola Unamuno (1923)
- Ascochyta staticis
- Ascochyta stellariae Fautrey (1896)
- Ascochyta sterculiae Tassi (1901)
- Ascochyta sternbergensis Petr. (1929)
- Ascochyta stilbocarpae Syd. (1924)
- Ascochyta stipae-pennatae Punith. (1979)
- Ascochyta stipae Died. (1912)
- Ascochyta stipata
- Ascochyta stipina
- Ascochyta straminea Punith. (1979)
- Ascochyta strobilina
- Ascochyta subalpina R. Sprague & Aar.G. Johnson (1950)
- Ascochyta suberosa
- Ascochyta subgen. Ascochyta
- Ascochyta subgen. Ascochytula
- Ascochyta syconophila Curzi (1927)
- Ascochyta symphoriae
- Ascochyta symphoricarpi
- Ascochyta symphoricarpophila Fairm. (1910)
- Ascochyta syringae (Westend.) Bres. (1894)
- Ascochyta syringaecola Bubák & Kabát (1908)
- Ascochyta syringicola

== T ==
- Ascochyta tamaricis Golovin (1950)
- Ascochyta tami Hollós (1926)
- Ascochyta taraxaci (Hollós) Grove (1922)
- Ascochyta tarda R.B. Stewart (1957)
- Ascochyta tatarica
- Ascochyta tayabensis
- Ascochyta tecomae
- Ascochyta tehonii Melnik (1975)
- Ascochyta telekiae Vanev & Bakalova (1976)
- Ascochyta telephii
- Ascochyta tenerifensis Jørst. (1966)
- Ascochyta tenerrima Sacc. & Roum. (1882)
- Ascochyta teretiuscula Sacc. & Roum. (1882)
- Ascochyta teucrii Lasch (1850)
- Ascochyta thalictri
- Ascochyta thalictricola Gonz. Frag. ex Trotter (1931)
- Ascochyta thaspii Ellis & Everh. (1889)
- Ascochyta theae Hara (1919)
- Ascochyta thermopsidis Solheim (1934)
- Ascochyta thlaspeos
- Ascochyta tiliacorae
- Ascochyta tiliae
- Ascochyta tini
- Ascochyta tirolensis Bubák (1904)
- Ascochyta tobirae Hara (1917)
- Ascochyta tokyoensis (Tassi) Punith. (1988)
- Ascochyta toluiferae Speg. (1912)
- Ascochyta trachelospermi
- Ascochyta trachycarpi Melnik (1970)
- Ascochyta tragi Cruchet (1909)
- Ascochyta tragiae Speg. (1910)
- Ascochyta tragopogonis Bondartsev (1906)
- Ascochyta translucens Kabát & Bubák (1905)
- Ascochyta treleasei Berl. & Voglino (1886)
- Ascochyta tremulae
- Ascochyta tribuli Bond.-Mont. (1945)
- Ascochyta trifolii-alpestris
- Ascochyta trifolii Bondartsev & Trusova (1913)
- Ascochyta trifolli-alpestris Dominik (1934)
- Ascochyta trigonellae Traverso & Spessa (1911)
- Ascochyta trillii (Ellis & Everh.) Aa (2002)
- Ascochyta tripolitana Sacc. & Trotter (1912)
- Ascochyta tritici
- Ascochyta trollii
- Ascochyta tropaeoli (Sacc. & Speg.) Bond.-Mont. (1938)
- Ascochyta tulipae Byzova (1964)
- Ascochyta tussilaginis Oudem. (1898)
- Ascochyta tweediana
- Ascochyta typhae-angustatae Punith. (1988)
- Ascochyta typhoidearum

== U ==
- Ascochyta ulicis-caledoniensis Punith. (2002)
- Ascochyta ulicis (Grove) P.K. Buchanan (1987)
- Ascochyta ulmella
- Ascochyta ulmi
- Ascochyta unedonis
- Ascochyta uredinis
- Ascochyta urenae
- Ascochyta urticae A.L. Sm. & Ramsb. (1915)
- Ascochyta urticicola Vanev & Bakalova (1989)
- Ascochyta usitatissima Rothers (1927)
- Ascochyta utahensis R. Sprague (1948)

== V ==
- Ascochyta vaccinii
- Ascochyta valerandi Jaap (1916)
- Ascochyta valerianae A.L. Sm. & Ramsb. (1913)
- Ascochyta valerianellae
- Ascochyta vasjaginae Melnik (1967)
- Ascochyta velata Kabát & Bubák (1907)
- Ascochyta ventricosa
- Ascochyta veratri
- Ascochyta veratrina
- Ascochyta verbasci
- Ascochyta verbascina
- Ascochyta verbenae Siemaszko (1919)
- Ascochyta veronicae Rostr. (1903)
- Ascochyta veronicicola Melnik (1967)
- Ascochyta versabilis
- Ascochyta versicolor Bubák (1905)
- Ascochyta viburni
- Ascochyta viburnicola Oudem. (1901)
- Ascochyta viciae-lathyroidis Syd. & P. Syd. (1900)
- Ascochyta viciae-pannonicae Ondřej (1970)
- Ascochyta viciae-pisiformis Bubák (1904)
- Ascochyta viciae-villosae Ondřej (1968)
- Ascochyta viciae
- Ascochyta vicicola
- Ascochyta viciicola
- Ascochyta vicina f. euonymella
- Ascochyta vicina f. vicina
- Ascochyta vicina var. euonymella
- Ascochyta vicina var. foliicola
- Ascochyta vicina
- Ascochyta vignae M.I. Nikol. (1970)
- Ascochyta vincae Grove (1916)
- Ascochyta vindobonensis Petr. (1947)
- Ascochyta violae-hirtae Bubák (1903)
- Ascochyta violae Sacc. & Speg. (1878)
- Ascochyta violicola McAlpine (1904)
- Ascochyta virgaureae
- Ascochyta viscariae Henn. (1904)
- Ascochyta vitalbae
- Ascochyta vitalbicola Maire (1937)
- Ascochyta vitellinae
- Ascochyta viticola
- Ascochyta vivia
- Ascochyta vodakii Bubák (1907)
- Ascochyta volubilis
- Ascochyta vulgaris
- Ascochyta vulnerariae

== W ==
- Ascochyta weigelae
- Ascochyta weigeliae
- Ascochyta weissiana Allesch. (1900)
- Ascochyta winteri
- Ascochyta wisconsina Davis (1915)
- Ascochyta wistariae
- Ascochyta wisteriae
- Ascochyta woronowiana Siemaszko (1919)

== X ==
- Ascochyta xanthiicola Nelen (1966)

== Y ==
- Ascochyta yakushimensis Tak. Kobay. (1976)
- Ascochyta yuccaefolia
- Ascochyta yuccaefoliae
- Ascochyta yuccifolia Gonz. Frag. ex E.K. Cash (1972)

== Z ==
- Ascochyta zanthoxyli J.D. Sun & J.K. Bai (1995)
- Ascochyta zavrelii-ignatii Picb. (1937)
- Ascochyta zeae G.L. Stout (1930)
- Ascochyta zeicola
- Ascochyta zeina
- Ascochyta zimmermanni-hugonis Bubák (1915)
- Ascochyta zimmermanni
- Ascochyta zimmermannii Bubák (1913)
- Ascochyta zingiberi
- Ascochyta zingibericola Punith. (1988)
- Ascochyta zingiberis
- Ascochyta zinniae Allesch. (1900)
- Ascochyta zonata
- Ascochyta zygophylli
