= PRSV =

PRSV may refer to:

- The plant pathogenic virus Papaya ringspot virus
- In thermodynamics, the Peng–Robinson–Stryjek–Vera equation of state
