= Ascochyta graminea =

Scientific classification
- Kingdom: Fungi
- Division: Ascomycota
- Class: Dothideomycetes
- Order: Pleosporales
- Family: Didymellaceae
- Genus: Ascochyta
- Species: A. graminea

Binomial name
- Ascochyta graminea (Sacc.) R. Sprague & Aar.G. Johnson, (1950)

Synonyms
- Diplodia graminea Diplodina graminea

Species of fungus

Ascochyta graminea is a plant pathogen that causes Ascochyta leaf spot on barley which can also be caused by the related fungi Ascochyta hordei, Ascochyta sorghi and Ascochyta tritici. It is considered a minor disease of barley.

== See also ==
- List of Ascochyta species
