= Maureen Fitch =

Plant physiologist

Maureen Fitch is a plant physiologist who worked for the U.S. Department of Agriculture, and currently works for Hawaii Agriculture Research Center. She was part of the team of researchers that engineered papayas resistant to the Papaya ringspot virus (PRSV), and has co-authored many other papers on this subject, and related topics.
