= Collar rot =

Disease of plants

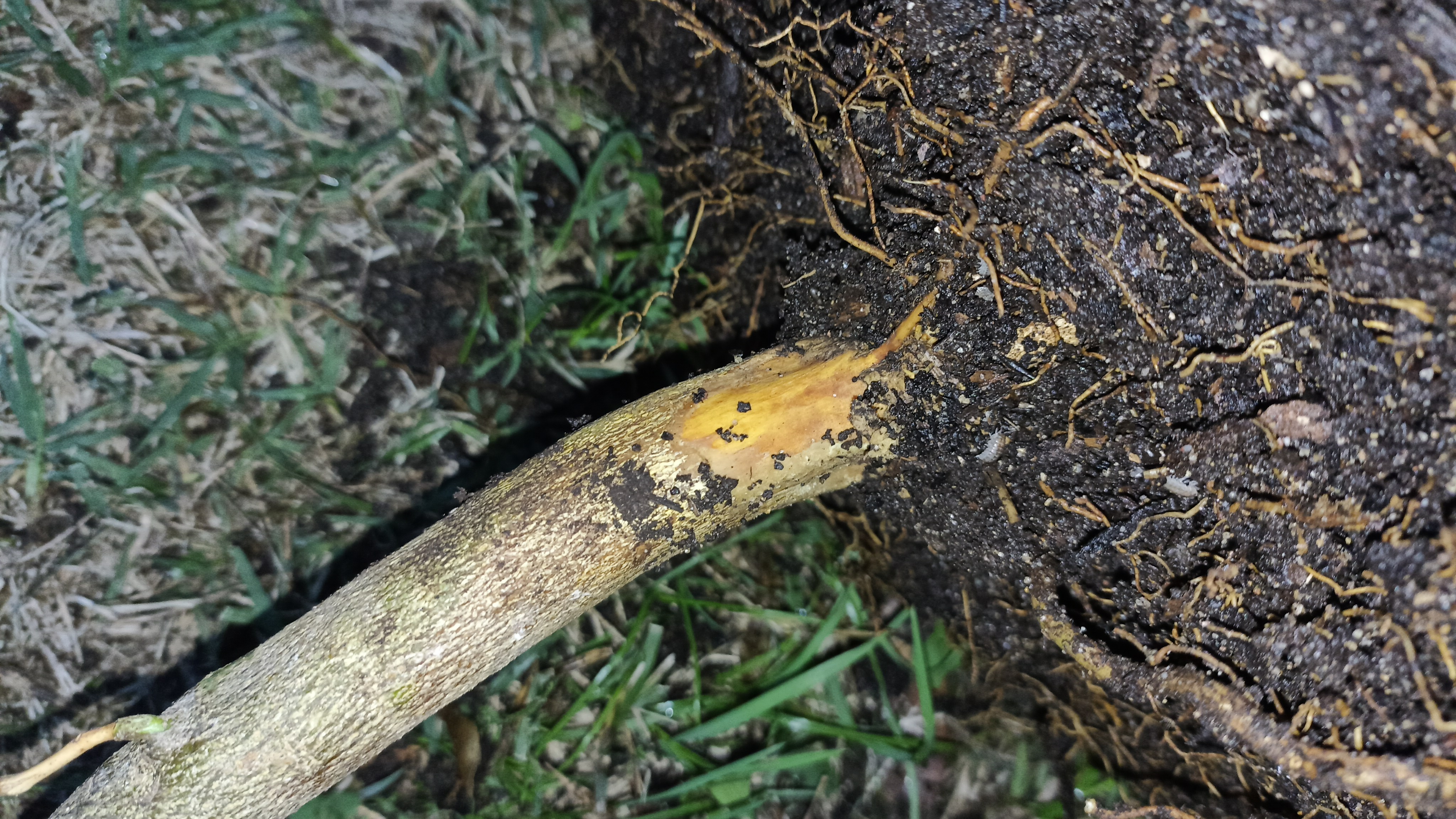
Lemon tree with Phytophthora collar rot

Collar rot is a symptomatically described disease that is usually caused by any one of various fungal and oomycete plant pathogens. It is present where the pathogen causes a lesion localized at or about the collet between the stem and the root. The lesions develop around the stem eventually forming a "collar". Observationally, collar rot grades into "basal stem rot", and with some pathogens is the first phase of "basal stem rot" often followed by "root rot". Collar rot is most often observed in seedings grown in infected soil. The pathogens that cause collar rot may be species or genera specific. But generalist pathogens such as Agroathelia rolfsii (aka Sclerotium rolfsii or Athelia rolfsii) are known to attack over 200 different species. While bacteria caused collar rot is not common, trees infected with Fire blight (Erwinia amylovora) may develop collar rot. Non-parasitic collar rot may be caused by winter damage.

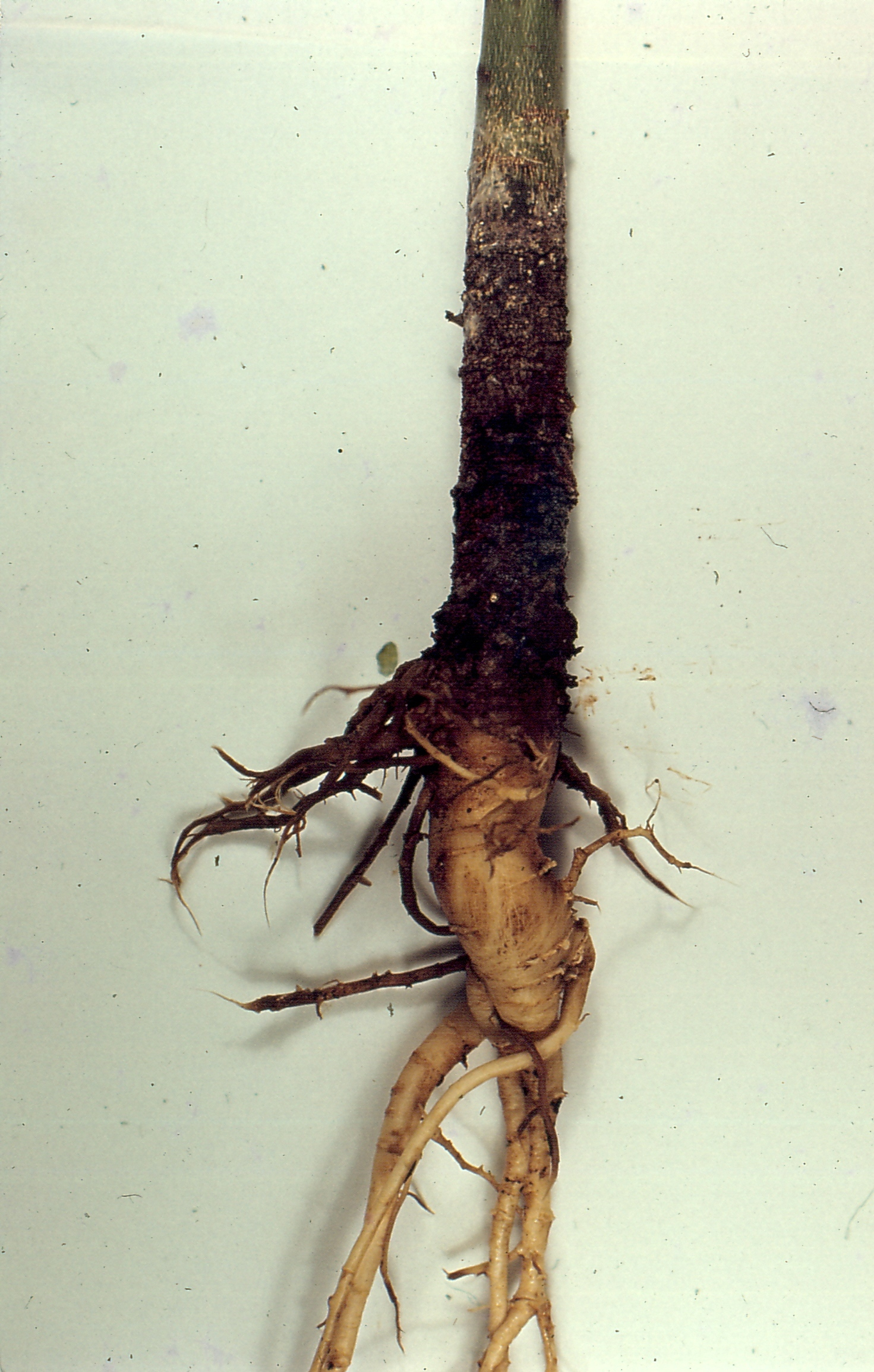
Calonectria collar rot of papaya

The symptomatically described disease Southern blight is often the first observed precursor of the collar rot caused by the fungus Agroathelia rolfsii. Causally known as Sclerotial blight, Agroathelia rolfsii survives in the soil as sclerotia, and in infected decomposing plant material as mycelia.

Collar rot that is caused by the oomycete Phytophthora is causally called Phytophthora collar rot, and is a common disease of fruit and nut trees, as well as other flowers and crops. Phytophthora species remain in the soil, as spores, and in infected plant tissue, as mycelia, so absent control measures (sterilization, toxic applications) the disease continues so long as susceptible plants are grown in that soil.

== Hosts and agents ==
- In carnations (Dianthus caryophyllus) by Alternaria dianthi,
- In chili (Capsicum) by Phytophthora,
- In cinchona (Cinchona officinalis) by Phytophthora quininea,
- In Chinese evergreens (Aglaonema) by Fusarium subgutinans,
- In coffee plants (Coffea) by Gibberella stilboides,
- In dogwoods (genus Cornus) by Phytophthora cactorum where the disease is also called "crown canker",
- In eggplant/brinjal (Solanum melongena) by Sclerotinia sclerotiorum and Sclerotium rolfsii,
- In elephant foot yams (Amorphophallus paeoniifolius) by Sclerotium rolfsii,
- In fruit and nut trees by a variety of pathogens including Sclerotium rolfsii, Alternaria and Phytophthora,
- In groundnut/peanut (Arachis hypogaea) by Aspergillus niger which also causes wilt and crown rot, and by Lasiodiplodia theobromae,
- In hardwoods and conifers by Phytophthora cinnamomi,
- In maize (corn, Zea mays) by Sclerotium rolfsii,
- In papaya by Calonectria,
- In pines by both Phytophthora and Diplodia pinastri,
- In rhododendron, China aster, marigold, gloxinia and zinnia by Phytophthora cryptogea,
- In sunflowers by Sclerotium rolfsii, and by Phytophthora cryptogea.
- In sweet potatoes (Ipomoea batatas) by Sclerotium rolfsii,
- In tobacco by Sclerotinia sclerotiorum.
- In tomatoes (Solanum lycopersicum) by Alternaria solani,

== Related diseases ==
- Rootstock blight
- Stem rot
