= Ascochyta hordei =

Scientific classification
- Kingdom: Fungi
- Division: Ascomycota
- Class: Dothideomycetes
- Order: Pleosporales
- Family: Didymellaceae
- Genus: Ascochyta
- Species: A. hordei

Binomial name
- Ascochyta hordei Hara, (1930)

Pathogenic fungus

Ascochyta hordei is a plant pathogen that causes Ascochyta leaf spot on barley and wheat. ALS of barley can also be caused by other Ascochyta including A. graminea, A. sorghi, and A. tritici. It is considered a minor disease.

== Distribution ==
Russia, the Ukraine, southern Byelorussia, North Ossetia, Albania, Japan, Mid Canterbury, New Zealand, and the mountains of North America.
