= Dennis Gonsalves =

American phytopathologist

Dr Dennis Gonsalves
- Education: University of Hawaii (BSc ); University of California, Davis (PhD)
- Known for: Research on mechanisms of virus infection and strategies for developing plants resistant to them
- Awards: Humboldt Prize; Agriculture Research Service Science Hall of Fame; Leadership in Science Public Service Award; Presidential Distinguished Rank Award

Dennis Gonsalves (born 1943) is an American phytopathologist. He has created with his team two virus-resistant papaya cultivars called SunUp and Rainbow, which rescued the papaya sector in Hawaii from the devastating effects of the papaya ringspot virus that hit in the late 1990s.

== Life ==
Gonsalves was born and raised on a sugar plantation in Kohala, Hawaii. He studied horticulture (BS, 1965) and phytopathology at the University of Hawaii. His doctorate was in 1968 at the University of California, Davis. From 1972 to 1977 he worked at the University of Florida and from 1977 to 2002 at Cornell University, where he became a professor in 1995. Since 2002 he was the director of a USDA research center in Hilo and is now retired and living in Hawaii.

== Work ==
Gonsalves began his research career at Cornell University working on virus-resistant plants. While on a trip back home to Hawaii, he learned from local farmers that a virus was rapidly making its way toward the Big Island's Puna District, where the majority of the state's papayas were grown. This led to his starting a research program in 1985 that resulted in the creation of a papaya with resistance to the papaya ringspot virus. His work is recognized worldwide and has received several awards.

His Rainbow papaya makes up about 77 percent of the Hawaii's crop. Funded by USAID, he helped develop locally adapted papaya varieties for Venezuela, Jamaica, Brazil, Africa, and Bangladesh.

== Awards ==
- 2002: Humboldt Prize
- 2003: The American Society of Plant Biologists (ASPB) Leadership in Science Public Service Award
- 2004: USDA Technology Transfer Award
- 2007: Agriculture Research Service Science Hall of Fame
- 2009: Presidential Distinguished Rank Award
- Lee Hutchison Award for accomplishments in research, mentoring, and outreach to developing countries
- fellow of the American Phytopathological Society

== Example Patents ==
- December 7, 1999 Potyvirus coat protein genes and plants transformed therewith
- June 30, 2009 Papaya ringspot virus genes
- May 19, 2009 Synthetic nucleic acid molecule for imparting multiple traits
- May 1, 2007 Grapevine fanleaf virus resistance in grapevine
- August 1, 2006 Isolated nucleic acid molecules relating to papaya fruit ripening
