= Papaya lethal yellowing virus =

Virus classification
- (unranked): Virus
- Realm: Riboviria
- Kingdom: Orthornavirae
- Phylum: Pisuviricota
- Class: Pisoniviricetes
- Order: Sobelivirales
- Family: Solemoviridae
- Genus: Sobemovirus
- Species: Sobemovirus PLYV

Species of virus

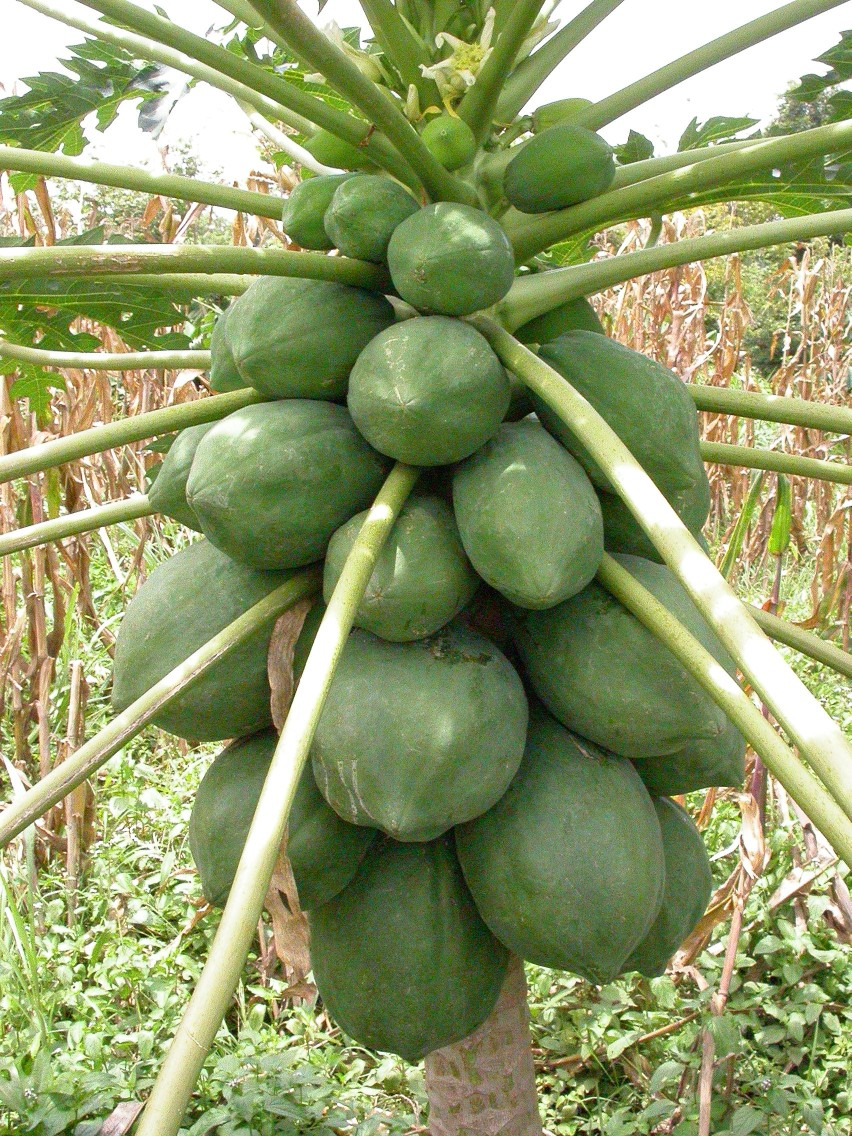
Carica papaya MS4113 (non-diseased)

Papaya lethal yellowing virus (PLYV) is an isometric viral plant pathogen, tentatively assigned to the genus Sobemovirus, that causes lethal yellowing disease of the papaya plant.

The virus infects only Carica papaya, Jacaratia heterophylla, J. spinosa, Vasconcellea cauliflora, V. monoica and V. quercifolia, all from the papaya family Caricaceae. It is only found in Northeastern Brazil and has no confirmed biological vectors. PLYV consists of a 36 kDa capsid protein and a single-stranded RNA genome 4145 nt in length, and causes progressive leaf yellowing and greenish circular spots on the fruits. Control of this virus is of economic importance in Northeast Brazil, as 60% of Brazil’s papaya production occurs there.

== Hosts and symptoms ==
As the name implies, PLYV is very host-specific. In an inoculation study, the virus only infected members of the papaya family Caricaceae, whereas other species (Chenopodium amaranticolor, C. murale, C. quinoa and Nicotiana benthamiana) were not infected.

The signs of the virus begin to become visible when the leaves at the top of the plant begin turning yellow and eventually fall off. This usually occurs in the upper third of the canopy and death of the plant usually occurs soon after the leaves wilt and die. The fruit in some studies was found to be delayed in the ripening process and the pulp turns hard.

== Disease cycle ==
PLYV was first recognized in the 1980s, and has always been restricted to a relatively small geographical area. Therefore, it is not likely that the virus has been introduced to other regions. It is more likely that the virus was present in wild hosts and jumped to papaya plants once this crop became widely cultivated in that area (i.e. northeastern Brazil).

While no biological vector is known for PLYV is known, it is known to be spread by human actions, including contaminated hands, agricultural tools, soil, and contaminated water. The virus can be detected on the surface of seeds of infected fruits, but it is not detected in the embryo or in seeds harvested from infected roots. As a result, the virus is likely spread by infected plantlets or growers using contaminated tools.

PLYV is very stable and in one experiment was detected in dried roots and leaves maintained at room temperature up to 120 days. This shows that the virus has high stability in non living plant tissues, which further explains how it can be spread by human actions. PLYV has a thermal inactivation point of 80 °C.

== Management ==
PLYV can be controlled in various ways. These include use of virus-free plantlets, eradication of virus-infected plants, disinfecting agricultural tools that have been exposed to PLYV, and adopting growing techniques that reduce human-assisted transmission of the virus.

== Importance ==
Control of the virus is economically important in Brazil, which contributes about 25% of world papaya production, and where the papaya crop ranks above strawberries and below grapefruit in total production. The risk of mechanical transmission is high because trees are grown at a high density of 1,500 to 2,500 per hectare in commercial production.

== See also ==
- List of papaya diseases
