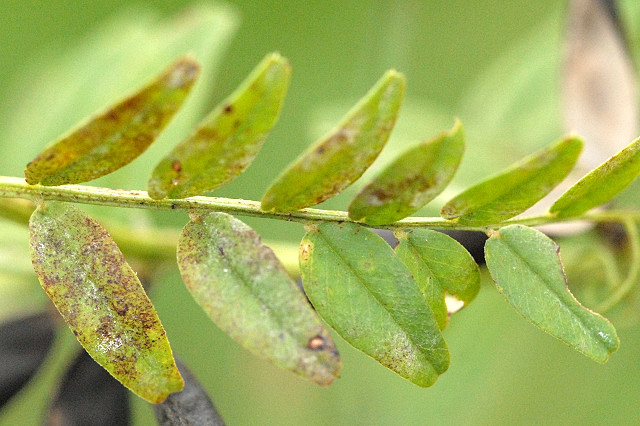

Scientific classification
- Kingdom: Fungi
- Division: Ascomycota
- Class: Dothideomycetes
- Order: Pleosporales
- Family: Didymellaceae
- Genus: Ascochyta
- Species: A. viciae

Binomial name
- Ascochyta viciae Lib.

= Ascochyta viciae =

Species of fungus

Ascochyta viciae is an ascomycete fungus species in the genus Ascochyta.

Ascofuranone is an antibiotic first isolated from a strain of A. viciae in 1972; however, the identification of the strain is later revised as Acremonium sclerotigenum, and A. viciae cannot produce this antibiotic.

== See also ==
- List of Ascochyta species
