= Ascochyta spinaciae =

Scientific classification
- Kingdom: Fungi
- Division: Ascomycota
- Class: Dothideomycetes
- Order: Pleosporales
- Family: Didymellaceae
- Genus: Ascochyta
- Species: A. spinaciae

Binomial name
- Ascochyta spinaciae Bond.-Mont., (1923)

Species of fungus

Ascochyta spinaciae is a fungal plant pathogen that causes leaf spot of spinach.

== See also ==
- List of Ascochyta species
