= Ascochyta doronici =

Scientific classification
- Kingdom: Fungi
- Division: Ascomycota
- Class: Dothideomycetes
- Order: Pleosporales
- Family: Didymellaceae
- Genus: Ascochyta
- Species: A. doronici

Binomial name
- Ascochyta doronici Allesch., (1897)

Synonyms
- Ascochyta lappae (Sacc.) Jaap, (1914); Phyllosticta lappae Sacc., (1878)

Species of fungus

Ascochyta doronici is a fungal plant pathogen that causes leaf spot on African daisy.

== See also ==
- List of Ascochyta species
