= Ascochyta humuli =

Scientific classification
- Kingdom: Fungi
- Division: Ascomycota
- Class: Dothideomycetes
- Order: Pleosporales
- Family: Didymellaceae
- Genus: Ascochyta
- Species: A. humuli

Binomial name
- Ascochyta humuli Lasch

Species of fungus

Ascochyta humuli is a plant pathogen that causes leaf spot on hops; there is no cure or management, but only methods to reduce incidence or spread to save the crop that is essential to brewing beer.

== See also ==
- List of Ascochyta species
