= Ascochyta prasadii =

Scientific classification
- Kingdom: Fungi
- Division: Ascomycota
- Class: Dothideomycetes
- Order: Pleosporales
- Family: Didymellaceae
- Genus: Ascochyta
- Species: A. prasadii

Binomial name
- Ascochyta prasadii D.D. Shukla & V.N. Pathak, (1968)

Species of fungus

Ascochyta prasadii is a plant pathogen that causes leaf spot and stem cankers on hemp.

== See also ==
- List of Ascochyta species
