= Stemphylium lycopersici =

Scientific classification
- Kingdom: Fungi
- Division: Ascomycota
- Class: Dothideomycetes
- Order: Pleosporales
- Family: Pleosporaceae
- Genus: Stemphylium
- Species: S. lycopersici

Binomial name
- Stemphylium lycopersici (Enjoji) W. Yamam., (1960)

Synonyms
- Stemphylium floridanum C.I. Hannon & G.F. Weber, (1955); Thyrospora lycopersici Enjoji, (1931)

Species of fungus

Stemphylium lycopersici is a plant pathogen infecting tomatoes, lettuce, Capsicum and papayas.
