= Asperisporium minutulum =

Scientific classification
- Kingdom: Fungi
- Division: Ascomycota
- Class: Dothideomycetes
- Order: Mycosphaerellales
- Family: Mycosphaerellaceae
- Genus: Asperisporium
- Species: A. minutulum

Binomial name
- Asperisporium minutulum (Sacc.) Deighton (1976)

Synonyms
- Fusicladium minutulum Sacc. (1920)

Species of fungus

Asperisporium minutulum is an ascomycete fungus that is a plant pathogen that causes the formation of leaf spots on grapes.
