= Ascochyta asparagina =

Scientific classification
- Kingdom: Fungi
- Division: Ascomycota
- Class: Dothideomycetes
- Order: Pleosporales
- Family: Didymellaceae
- Genus: Ascochyta
- Species: A. asparagina

Binomial name
- Ascochyta asparagina (Petr.) P.K. Buchanan, (1987)

Species of fungus

Ascochyta asparagina is a fungal plant pathogen. It causes stem blight (also known as Ascochyta blight) of asparagus, causing loss or death of branches.

== See also ==
- List of Ascochyta species
