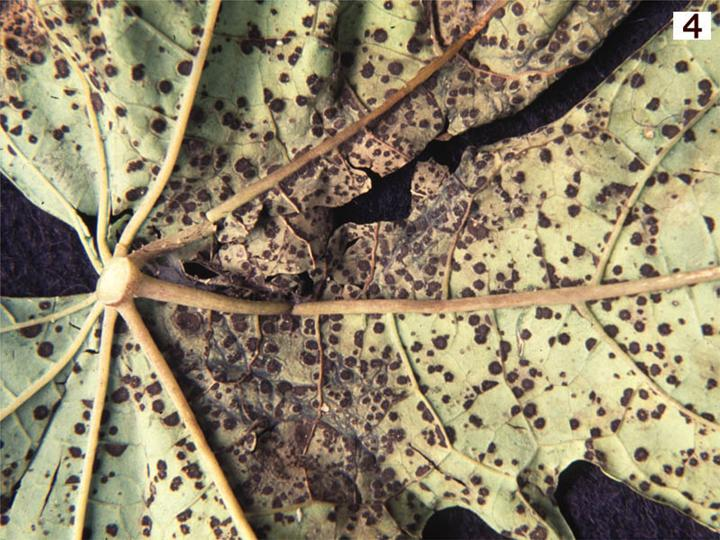
- Asperisporium caricae on papaya leaf

Scientific classification
- Domain: Eukaryota
- Kingdom: Fungi
- Division: Ascomycota
- Class: Dothideomycetes
- Order: Capnodiales
- Family: Mycosphaerellaceae
- Genus: Asperisporium; Maubl.

= Asperisporium =

Genus of fungi

Asperisporium is a genus of ascomycete fungi whose members are plant pathogens.

The genus is found in northern and southern America, parts of South Africa, India and the islands of Melanesia and Polynesia.

== Species ==
As accepted by Species Fungorum;

- Asperisporium acori Tehon (1948)
- Asperisporium asclepiadis (Ellis & Everh.) Deighton (1976)
- Asperisporium caricae (Speg.) Maubl. (1913)
- Asperisporium caricicola Crous & C. Nakash. (2015)
- Asperisporium cassiae (Syd.) Deighton (1976)
- Asperisporium galactiae A. Hern.-Gut., Z.M. Chaves & Dianese (2015)
- Asperisporium gnaphaliatum (Bonar) U. Braun (2000)
- Asperisporium mikaniigena (J.M. Yen & Lim) R.W. Barreto (1995)
- Asperisporium minutulum (Sacc.) Deighton (1976)
- Asperisporium moringae (Thirum. & Govindu) Deighton (1976)
- Asperisporium musicola Matsush. (1975)
- Asperisporium pongamiae-pinnatae Khawar, A. Kumar, Bhat & C. Nakash. (2012)
- Asperisporium rafinesquiae (Harkn.) U. Braun & Crous (2007)
- Asperisporium robur (Tho) U. Braun & Melnik (1996)
- Asperisporium vasconcelliae (Speg.) U. Braun (2000)

Former species;

- A. juniperinum (Georgescu & Badea) B. Sutton & Hodges (1990) = Phaeocercospora juniperina, Capnodiales
- A. mikaniae (Ellis & Everh.) R.W. Barreto (1995) = Passalora mikaniigena, Mycosphaerellaceae
- A. peucedani (Ellis & Holw.) Maubl. (1913) = Fusicladium peucedani, Venturiaceae
- A. pongamiae (Syd. & P. Syd.) Deighton (1976) = Pedrocrousiella pongamiae, Mycosphaerellaceae
- A. sequoiae (Ellis & Everh.) B. Sutton & Hodges (1990) = Passalora sequoiae, Mycosphaerellaceae
- A. vitiphyllum (Speschnew) Deighton (1975) = Sultanimyces vitiphyllus, Mycosphaerellaceae

== Gallery ==
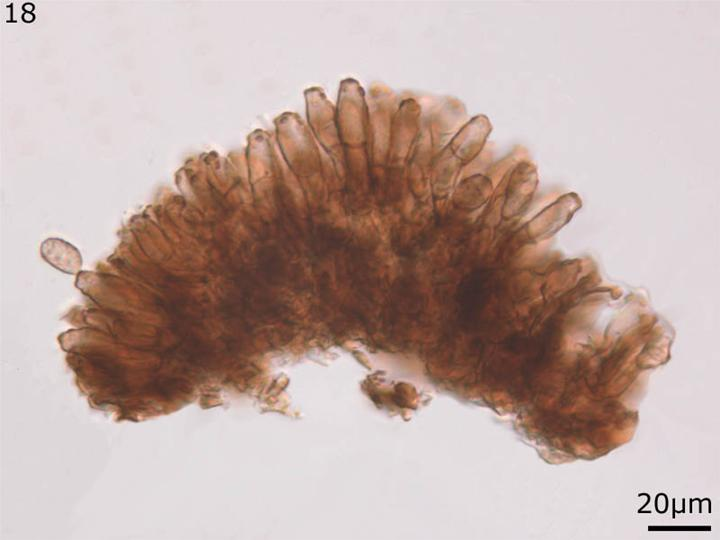
Asperisporium caricae under a microscope, displaying conidiophores and conidium

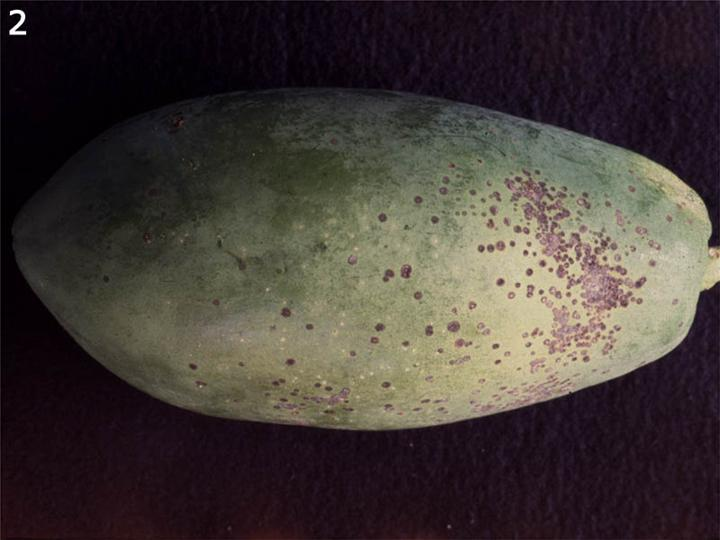
Asperisporium caricae on a papaya fruit

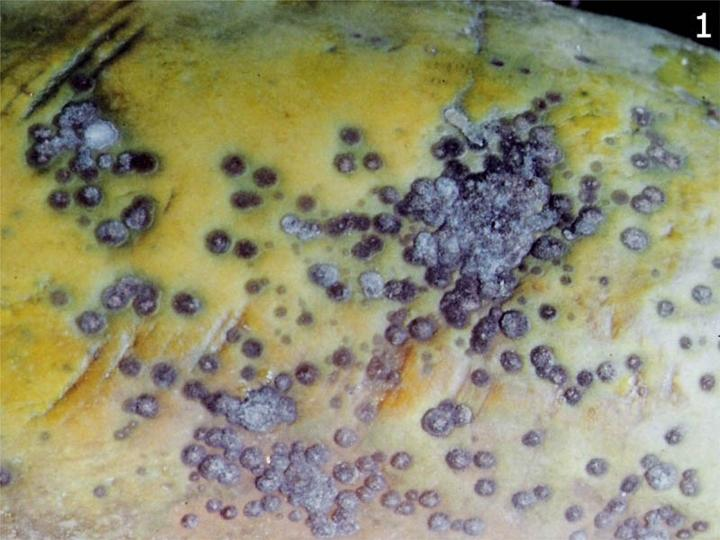
Close-up of Asperisporium caricae on a papaya
