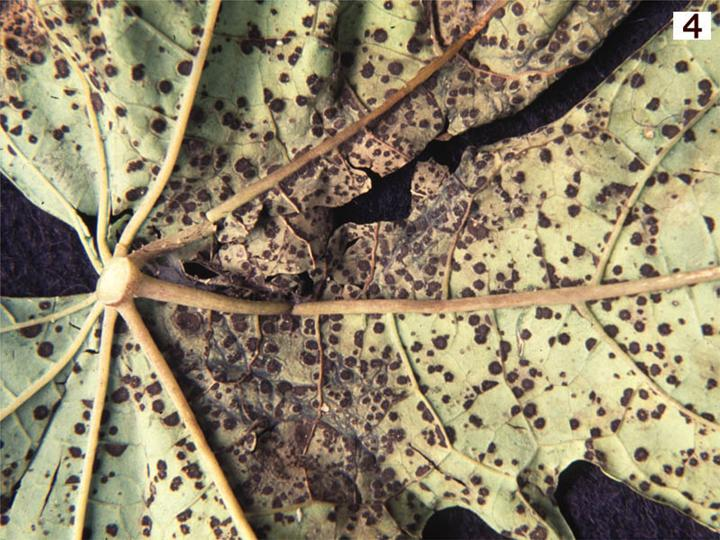
- Asperisporium caricae on papaya leaf

Scientific classification
- Kingdom: Fungi
- Division: Ascomycota
- Class: Dothideomycetes
- Order: Mycosphaerellales
- Family: Mycosphaerellaceae
- Genus: Asperisporium
- Species: A. caricae

Binomial name
- Asperisporium caricae (Speg.) Maubl. (1913)

Synonyms
- Cercospora caricae Speg. (1886); Epiclinium cumminsii Massee (1898); Fusicladium caricae (Speg.) Sacc.; Pucciniopsis caricae (Speg.) Höhn. (1923); Pucciniopsis caricae Earle; Scolicotrichum caricae Ellis & Everh.

= Asperisporium caricae =

Species of fungus

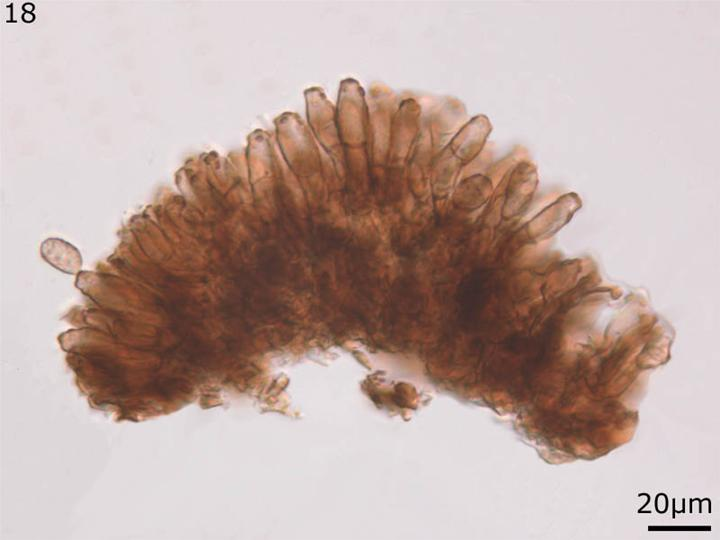
Asperisporium caricae under a microscope, displaying conidiophores and conidium.

Asperisporium caricae is an ascomycete fungus that is a plant pathogen, found in North and South America. It is responsible for the black spot disease on papaya trees. It affects generally leaves and fruits at any time. Sporodochia of Asperisporium caricae was growing under side of leaf, dark blackish brown to black, stroma well-developed, erumpent.
