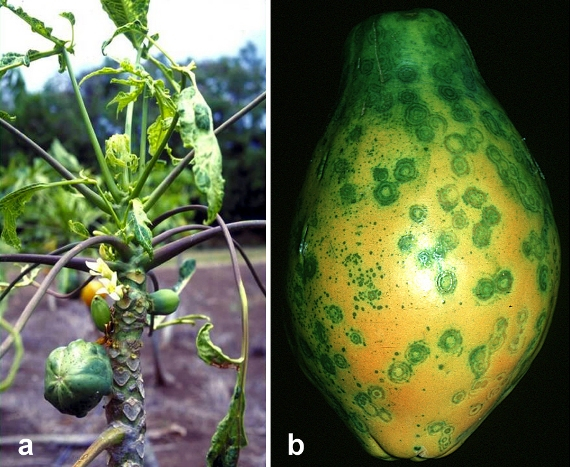
- Symptoms of PRSV on Papaya tree (a) and fruit (b)

Virus classification
- (unranked): Virus
- Realm: Riboviria
- Kingdom: Orthornavirae
- Phylum: Pisuviricota
- Class: Stelpaviricetes
- Order: Patatavirales
- Family: Potyviridae
- Genus: Potyvirus
- Species: Potyvirus papayanuli

Synonyms
- Papaya ringspot potyvirus; Papaya distortion mosaic virus; Papaya leaf distortion virus; Papaw distortion ringspot virus; Papaw mosaic virus; Watermelon mosaic virus 1

= Papaya ringspot virus =

Species of virus

Papaya ringspot virus (PRSV) is a pathogenic plant virus in the genus Potyvirus and the virus family Potyviridae which primarily infects the papaya tree.

The virus is a non-enveloped, flexuous rod-shaped particle that is between 760–800 nm long and 12 nm in diameter. It is transmitted between plants by mechanical activities like pruning and by numerous aphid species such as Myzus persicae. No seed transmission has been detected.

There are two major types of this virus, but both are serologically indistinguishable and are so closely genetically related that they are now considered the same virus species. The type that gave the virus its name are the Type P isolates (PRSV-P). This type infects papaya and several members of the melon family (Cucurbitaceae). The other type, Type W isolates (PRSV-W), does not infect papaya. Isolates of PRSV-W do infect cucurbits such as watermelon, cucumber, and squash and were originally known as Watermelon mosaic virus 1.

== History ==
Hawaiian papaya production has been severely affected twice by PRSV. The virus was introduced to Oahu as early as 1937. The disease was mild for a number of years until it either mutated or a more aggressive strain was introduced around 1950. Within 12 years, the amount of land under papaya production dropped 94%. Production was then moved from Oahu to the Puna region of Hawaii island (the "Big Island") under strict quarantine. In 1971 PRSV was found in home gardens but efforts were taken to prevent its spread. The virus emerged in commercial farms in 1992 and by 1995 production in Puna was impossible. Commercial growers again relocated to the Hamakua coast but with only limited success. Hawaiian papaya production was halved by the end of the decade. Transgenic papaya varieties that are resistant to PRSV entered production in 1998 and resuscitated the industry.

== Distribution and origin ==
Both pathotypes are distributed worldwide. PRSV-P, for example, is known to be present in the Middle East, Africa, South and Central American. It has also been found in China, France, Germany, India, Italy, Mexico, Taiwan, and the United States. PRSV-W isolates have been found in the United States, the Caribbean, Mexico, Italy, Germany, Australia, France, India, the Middle East, and South America.

Using genetic phylogeny studies, researchers suspect the virus originated in Asia, likely India, about 2,250 years ago. From there it slowly spread through the continent reaching China about 600 years ago. It was also introduced directly from India to Australia and the Americas within the last 300 years. Papayas were introduced to India only 500 years ago, at which point the virus made the jump from cucurbits. However, the virus has switched back and forth between pathotypes many times in its evolution.

== PRSV-P ==
Symptoms are typical of viral diseases. Papaya exhibits yellowing, leaf distortion, and severe mosaic. Oily or water-soaked spots and streaks appear on the trunk and petioles. The fruit will exhibit bumps and the classic "ringspot". A severe isolate of PRSV has also been shown to cause tissue necrosis. Cucurbit symptoms tend to be similar to papaya symptoms including blisters, mosaic, yellowing, and leaf distortions.

This virus produces two types of inclusion bodies visible under a light microscope with proper staining of epidermal strips. One inclusion is the typical cylindrical inclusion (CI) which is considered diagnostic for the potyvirus group, and the other is called the amorphous inclusion (AI). The presence of both inclusions can be diagnostic for this virus.

== PRSV-W ==
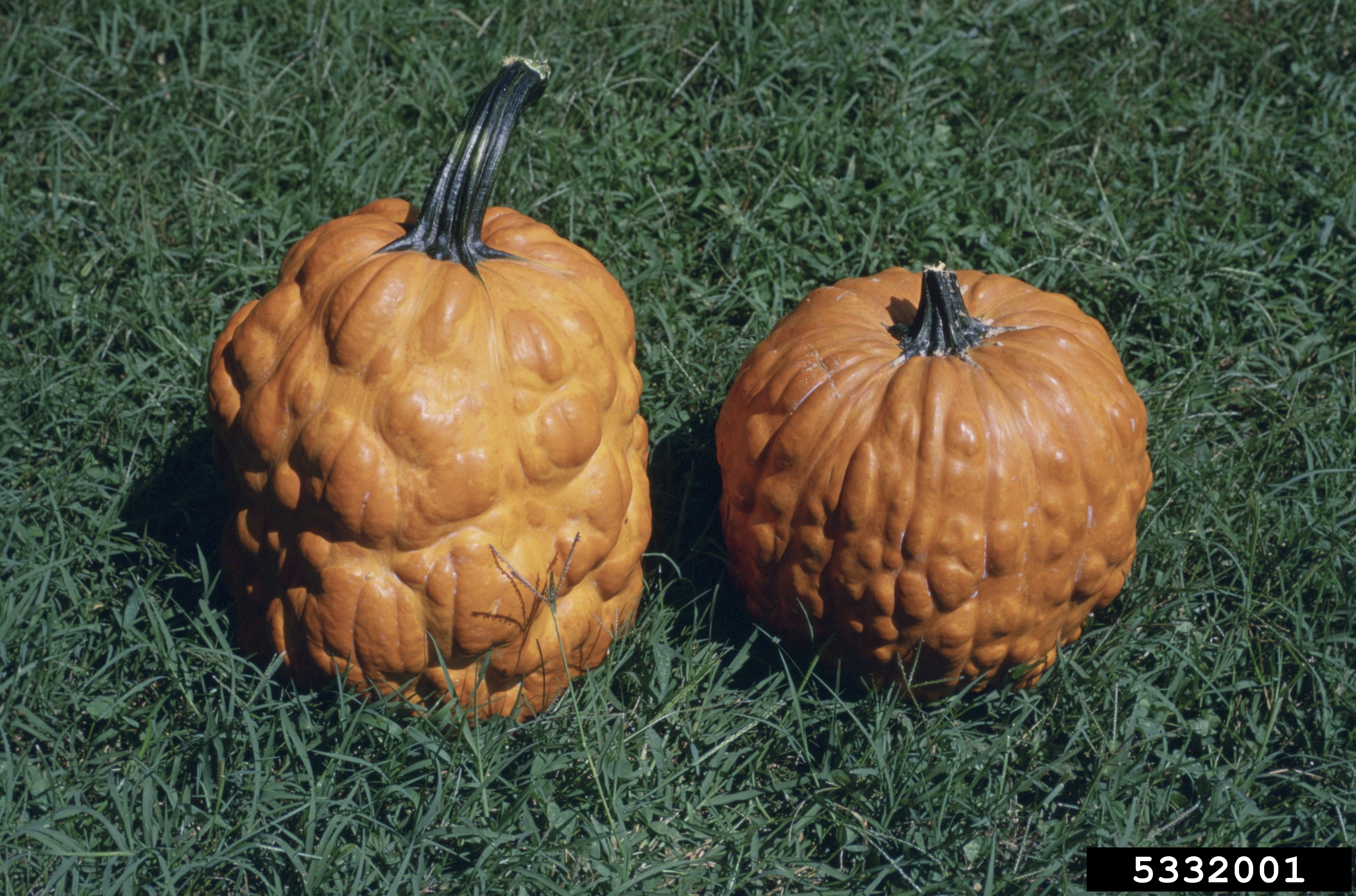
Symptoms of PRSV in pumpkins (Cucurbita pepo)

In squash, watermelon and other cucurbits, PRSV-W causes mottling and distortion of leaves and fruit. PRSV-W is considered to be one of the limiting factors in the growing of cucurbits in Florida.

PRSV-W should not be confused with Watermelon mosaic virus 2, another potyvirus that infects cucurbits around the world, including Florida, and which is now known simply as Watermelon mosaic virus (WMV). PRSV has a different host range, different serological properties, and no nucleotide sequence homology with WMV. WMV also has different cytoplasmic inclusion bodies that can differentiate it from PRSV-W.

Polyclonal and monoclonal antibodies have been made for both of the CI and AI proteins as well as for the capsid protein of PRSV-W.

== Vectors ==
Aphids are the predominant means by which PRSV is transmitted. PRSV is a non-persistent virus, meaning it does not enter beyond the feeding mouthparts of the aphid, and does not circulate or multiply within its insect host. Non-persistent viruses are transmitted quickly and easily between plants. Many species of aphid can transmit PRSV, particularly the Peach Aphid and Melon Aphid.

Seed transmission has been observed at rates of 2 infected second generation plants out of 1355. This method of transmission is marginal compared to transmission through aphid vectors. However, if infected seed survives, it could then function as a source on inoculum, which then could be spread by insect vectors.

Disease transmission can also occur by planting infected seedlings in fields where the virus is not present. Using "clean", virus-free seedlings for planting is of very high importance.

== Control ==
There is a known resistance to PRSV, although certain varieties are more symptomatic than others. There are four main methods of control for PRSV: quarantine and geographic displacement, roguing and netting, cross-protection, and genetic modification of the host plant. Because PRSV is a non-persistent virus and is consequently transmitted to healthy plants by aphids within a very short time period, insecticidal control is difficult and impractical. Once symptoms have been observed, it is already too late to spray for aphids – the disease has most likely already been transmitted to nearby healthy plants. In order to implement successful vector control, frequent preventative sprays are required, which is rarely done.

Prevention through quarantine and geographic displacement of cropland is common and has occurred in Hawaii, the Philippines and Brazil. When fields become infected, such as the case of Oahu papaya growers, attempts to relocate growing areas to virus-free fields are made. This is usually just a temporary avoidance of the disease, which eventually spreads to the new fields.

Roguing, or the removal and destruction of infected plants, is a way to control the spread of PRSV. This method was employed unsuccessfully when PRSV began to invade the Puna region of Hawaii. It is difficult to suppress the spread of PRSV through roguing because it is spread very quickly and effectively by aphids.

Netting can also be used to prevent insect vectors from spreading the virus. Production under netting is prohibitively expensive for subsistence and small-scale producers, but was used effectively in Taiwan because geographical displacement was not possible on such a small island.

=== Cross protection ===
Cross protection is similar in practice, although not in mode of action, to viral vaccinations in humans. A mild strain of PRSV is introduced into the host plant, which then develops resistance to virulent strains of the virus. Development of cross-protection in papaya was researched in Hawaii starting in 1979. A delay in the onset of symptoms was achieved, as well as a reduction in the severity of symptoms. However, inoculation of the mild strain also caused pathogenesis on the papaya plants.

Cross-protection is done in Taiwan, Thailand, and Hawaii using strains HA 5-1 and HA 6-1.

=== Transgenics ===
There are two transgenic varieties of papaya, Rainbow and SunUp, both of which were created by Dennis Gonsalves and his team and were introduced for production on May 1, 1998. Rainbow (created by Dennis Gonsalves) is an F1 hybrid, which is a cross between the yellow-fleshed Kapoho and the red-fleshed SunUp. Rainbow is produced on 76% of Hawaiian papaya acreage, while SunUp is hardly grown commercially. SunUp is thought to be more resistant to exotic strains of PRSV, while Rainbow has shown susceptibility to such exotic strains of the virus. Transgenic varieties have been shown to be extremely effective against Hawaiian strains of PRSV, showing complete resistance to the virus compared to 100% infection of susceptible strains in some trials.

Pathogen-derived resistance (PDR) is the technique of inserting a gene fragment from the pathogen into the transgenic crop, which then affords the crop plant resistance against the pathogen. This method was employed in the development of transgenic papaya. PRSV's coat protein gene was inserted into highly embryogenic plant tissue by using the newly invented gene gun, which led to the development of the transgenic line 55–1, which was proven to be effective at controlling Hawaiian strains of PRSV. PDR possibly works by RNA interference.

==== Deregulation ====
The evaluation of whether or not to release transgenic papaya in the United States was undertaken by APHIS, the EPA and the FDA. This incident was unique in that transgenic crops are usually developed and promoted by commercial operations, while transgenic papaya and the case for deregulation was adopted by University of Hawaii researchers. The university was highly motivated to help save the Hawaiian papaya industry, and consequently took a leading role in pushing for commercialization of the fruit.

Japan is 20% of Hawaii's export market. Japan had been resistant to approve GMO papaya since its introduction in 1998. As of 2011, the Rainbow transgenic papaya has been approved for export to Japan.

==== Durability of resistance ====
So far in Hawaii, there has been no breakdown of the coat protein resistance encoded in transgenic strains of papaya. Exposure to foreign strains of the virus is a serious risk, as Rainbow papayas have been shown to be susceptible to PRSV from Guam, Taiwan and Thailand.

One new transgenic line appears resistant to PRSV from multiple localities.

=== Hybridization ===
There is a long line of attempts to transfer PRSV-resistance from Vasconcellea spp. into papaya. Fertile resistant hybrid plants have been produced but are not known to be commercialized.

== Economic impact ==
In Hawaii, PRSV has had dramatic effects. Between 1992 and 1997, nearly all fields in the Puna region had been affected. This is a local industry worth $11 million annually.

Papaya is grown for personal consumption by small subsistence farmers in parts of Southeast Asia, with small surpluses sold at market. PRSV is the biggest constraint to papaya production in the Philippines. In 1994, PRSV damage had destroyed 60 million pesos worth of papaya production in the Southern Tagalog area, and had reduced production levels by 80%.

Brazil accounts for nearly half of global output, with India second and Nigeria third in worldwide production. Dramatic geographical shifts of production to avoid PRSV have been common. For example, between 1973 and 1984, papaya production moved substantially in Brazil away from Rio de Janeiro and São Paulo to the northern states of Espirito Santo and Bahia. As with the case of Hawaii, PRSV generally catches up to the industry's movements over time. The total economic costs of such redistributive costs are unknown, but likely significant.

Backlash against GMO papaya has resulted in surreptitious destruction of papaya plantations under the cover of darkness. In some cases, farmers have lost up to $15,000 worth of papaya trees.

== See also ==
- Maureen Fitch
- List of papaya diseases
