= Cercospora papayae =

Scientific classification
- Kingdom: Fungi
- Division: Ascomycota
- Class: Dothideomycetes
- Order: Mycosphaerellales
- Family: Mycosphaerellaceae
- Genus: Cercospora
- Species: C. papayae

Binomial name
- Cercospora papayae Hansf., (1943)

Species of fungus

Cercospora papayae is a fungal plant pathogen.
