= Cercospora mamaonis =

Scientific classification
- Kingdom: Fungi
- Division: Ascomycota
- Class: Dothideomycetes
- Order: Mycosphaerellales
- Family: Mycosphaerellaceae
- Genus: Cercospora
- Species: C. mamaonis

Binomial name
- Cercospora mamaonis Viégas & Chupp, (1954)

Species of fungus

Cercospora mamaonis is a fungal plant pathogen.
