= Gibberella stilboides =

Scientific classification
- Domain: Eukaryota
- Kingdom: Fungi
- Division: Ascomycota
- Class: Sordariomycetes
- Order: Hypocreales
- Family: Nectriaceae
- Genus: Gibberella
- Species: G. stilboides

Binomial name
- Gibberella stilboides W.L. Gordon ex C. Booth

Synonyms
- Fusarium fructigenum var. minus Wollenw. Fusarium lateritium var. longum Wollenw., (1931); Fusarium lateritium var. stilboides (Wollenw.) Bilai, (1987); Fusarium stilboides Wollenw., (1924); Fusarium stilboides var. minus (Wollenw.) Wollenw., (1931)

Species of fungus

Gibberella stilboides is a nectriacine fungus. It is a plant pathogen, and causes collar rot in coffee seedings.
