= Ascochyta caricae =

Scientific classification
- Kingdom: Fungi
- Division: Ascomycota
- Class: Dothideomycetes
- Order: Pleosporales
- Family: Didymellaceae
- Genus: Ascochyta
- Species: A. caricae

Binomial name
- Ascochyta caricae Rabenh., (1851)

Species of fungus

Ascochyta caricae is a fungal plant pathogen that causes dry rot on papaya.

== See also ==
- List of Ascochyta species
