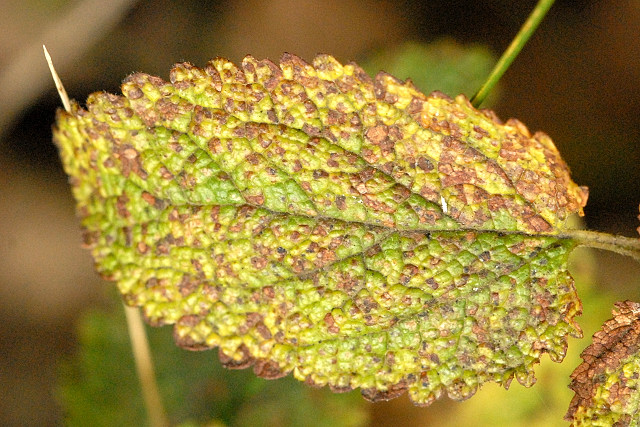
- Ascochyta teucrii from Commanster, Belgium

Scientific classification
- Kingdom: Fungi
- Division: Ascomycota
- Class: Dothideomycetes
- Order: Pleosporales
- Family: Didymellaceae
- Genus: Ascochyta; Lib. (1930)

Type species
- Ascochyta pisi Lib. (1830)

Species
- See text

= Ascochyta =

Genus of fungi

Ascochyta is a genus of ascomycete fungi, containing several species that are pathogenic to plants, particularly cereal crops. The taxonomy of this genus is still incomplete. The genus was first described in 1830 by Marie-Anne Libert, who regarded the spores as minute asci and the cell contents as spherical spores. Numerous revisions to the members of the genus and its description were made for the next several years. Species that are plant pathogenic on cereals include, A. hordei, A. graminea, A. sorghi, A. tritici. Symptoms are usually elliptical spots that are initially chlorotic and later become a necrotic brown. Management includes fungicide applications and sanitation of diseased plant tissue debris.

Some of these pathogens in the genus Ascochyta affect grass species, including grains.

== Some selected species of Ascochyta ==
- Ascochyta asparagina, Ascochyta blight
- Ascochyta bohemica
- Ascochyta boltshauseri
- Ascochyta caricae, Stem end rot
- Ascochyta chrysanthemi, Ray blight
- Ascochyta doronici
- Ascochyta fabae f.sp. lentis
- Ascochyta graminea
- Ascochyta gossypii, now Phoma exigua
- Ascochyta hordei
- Ascochyta humuli
- Ascochyta imperfecta
- Ascochyta pinodes, Ascochyta blight
- Ascochyta pisi, Leaf and pod spot
- Ascochyta prasadii
- Ascochyta rabiei, Blight on chickpeas
- Ascochyta rhei, Leaf spot
- Ascochyta sorghi, Sorghum rough leaf spot
- Ascochyta sorghina, Rough leaf spot
- Ascochyta spinaciae, Leaf spot
- Ascochyta tarda, Leaf blight
- Ascochyta tritici
- Ascochyta viciae
- Ascochyta vindobonensis

== Hosts and symptoms ==
Hosts species include wheat, barley, oats, rye, triticale, turfgrasses and many other grass species found throughout the world. Symptoms are found on lower leaves early in the season and upper leaves later in the season. Lesions are usually elliptical and are initially chlorotic. Later, they develop a brown margin with a white center and split longitudinally. Pycnidia can be found within the lesions are generally black in color.

== Disease cycle ==
The fungus often invades damaged leaf tissue caused by physical damage but can also penetrate through natural openings, such as stomata. In the spring, the primary inoculum is thought to be conidia, which are produced from pycnidia, and are dispersed by rainsplash to infect leaves. Infections lead to leaf spots which eventually develop into lesions. Black pycnidia can be observed in lesions. Secondary infection occurs when pycnidia produce more conidia during the growing season that are again dispersed by rainsplash and spread to new leaves for infection. The fungus overwinters as mycelium and pycnidia in host debris. Perithecia have also been observed in lesions and have been demonstrated to produce ascospores in later summer. Air-borne ascospores disperse in the fall and may cause primary infections the following season.

== Environment ==
Leaf spotting symptoms are often associated with high humidity, warm temperatures, dense foliage, and leaves in contact with soil. Because the fungus overwinters in plant debris on or in the soil and conidia are dispersed by rainsplash, initial infections occur on leaves in close proximity to the soil. High humidity and temperature promote sporulation. Dense foliage, which promotes high relative humidity, also promotes disease.

== Management ==
Currently, specific controls for Ascochyta leaf spot diseases have not been clearly described. Effective controls for a similar disease, Septoria leaf blotch, have been prescribed for Ascochyta leaf spot diseases. These include: crop rotation, fungicide application, variety selection, irrigation management, tillage to reduce residue, and good grassy weed control. Fungicides that are listed as providing 'Very Good' control of Septoria leaf blotch include Azoxystrobin 22.9%, Pyraclostrobin 3.6%, and Propiconazole 41.8%. Applying fungicides at the beginning of the season reduces the number of sporulating pycnidia and mycelium that overwintered. Sanitation through removing all plant debris from the field at the end of the season reduces the inoculum for the following season. Reduced irrigation prevents the spread of conidia from infected leaves to healthy leaves by decreasing dispersal of conidia. Removing grassy weeds that can harbor the pathogen also decreases the presence of inoculum.

== Importance ==
The disease is of relatively minor economic importance but is likely to contribute to foliar death in individual crops. Symptoms are often observed later in the season, towards the end of grain filling, when disease is unlikely to cause significant yield loss. The air-borne ascospores have been implicated in late summer asthma. Ascochyta can also cause leaf blight of turf grasses, so its importance is not limited to cereal grain crops. Ascochyta leaf blight of turf has become a common, although minor, disease of Kentucky bluegrass lawns in the United States.

== See also ==
- Plant pathology
