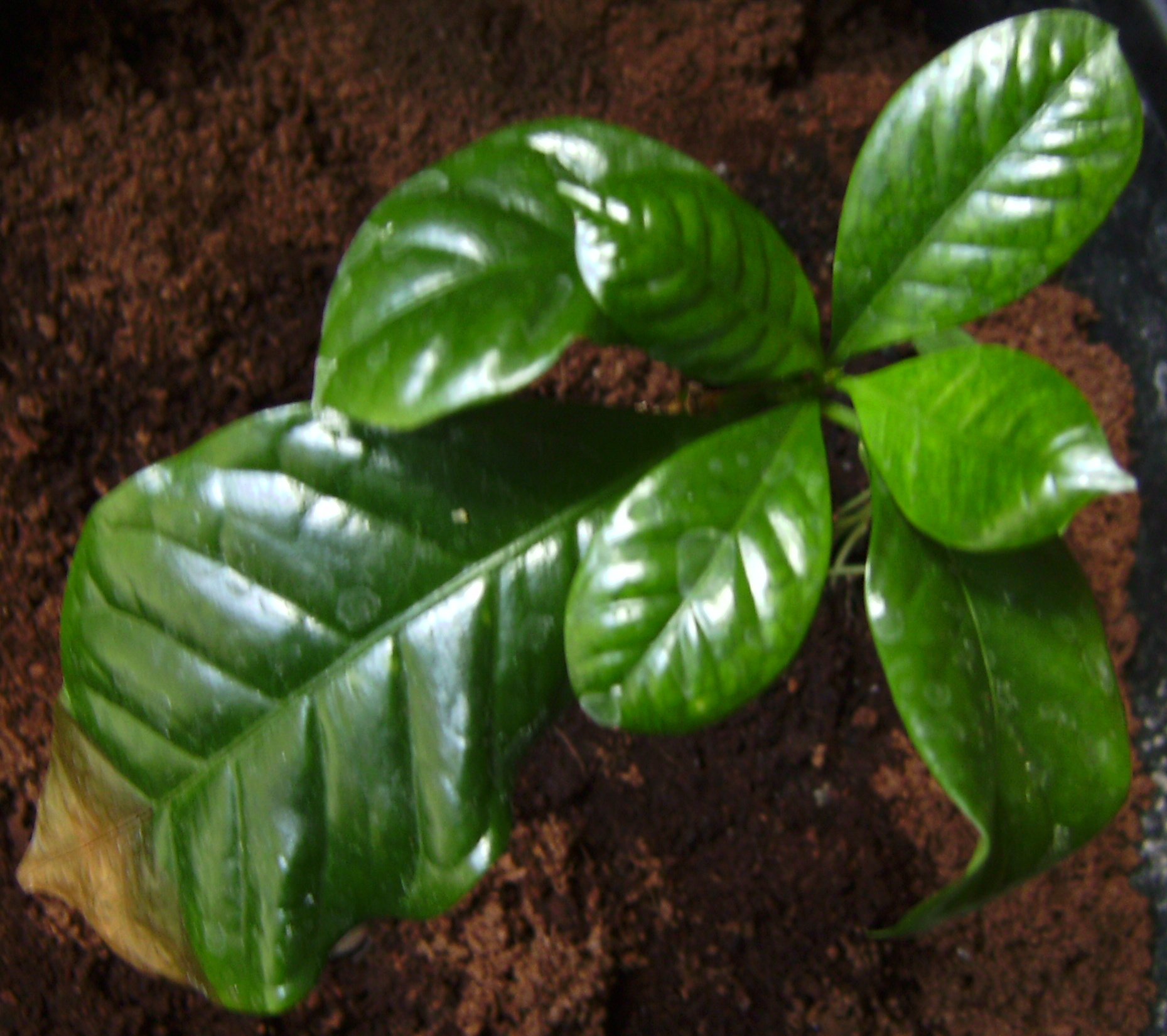
- Phoma costaricensis in a coffee plant's leaf

Scientific classification
- Domain: Eukaryota
- Kingdom: Fungi
- Division: Ascomycota
- Class: Dothideomycetes
- Order: Pleosporales
- Family: Didymellaceae
- Genus: Phoma
- Species: P. costaricensis

Binomial name
- Phoma costaricensis Echandi (1957)

= Phoma costaricensis =

Species of fungus

Phoma costaricensis is a plant pathogen infecting coffee. It is a soil fungus that infects the leaves and fruits of the coffee plant prior to the fruit ripening.
