= Pseudomonas caricapapayae =

Scientific classification
- Domain: Bacteria
- Kingdom: Pseudomonadati
- Phylum: Pseudomonadota
- Class: Gammaproteobacteria
- Order: Pseudomonadales
- Family: Pseudomonadaceae
- Genus: Pseudomonas
- Species: P. caricapapayae

Binomial name
- Pseudomonas caricapapayae Robbs, 1956

Type strain
- ATCC 33615 CCUG 32775; CFBP 3204; CIP 106736; ICMP 2855; LMG 2152; NCPPB 1873

Species of bacterium

Pseudomonas caricapapayae is a Gram-negative soil bacterium that is pathogenic to plants. It was originally isolated on papaya (Carica papaya) in Brazil. Based on 16S rRNA analysis, P. caricapapayae has been placed in the P. syringae group.
