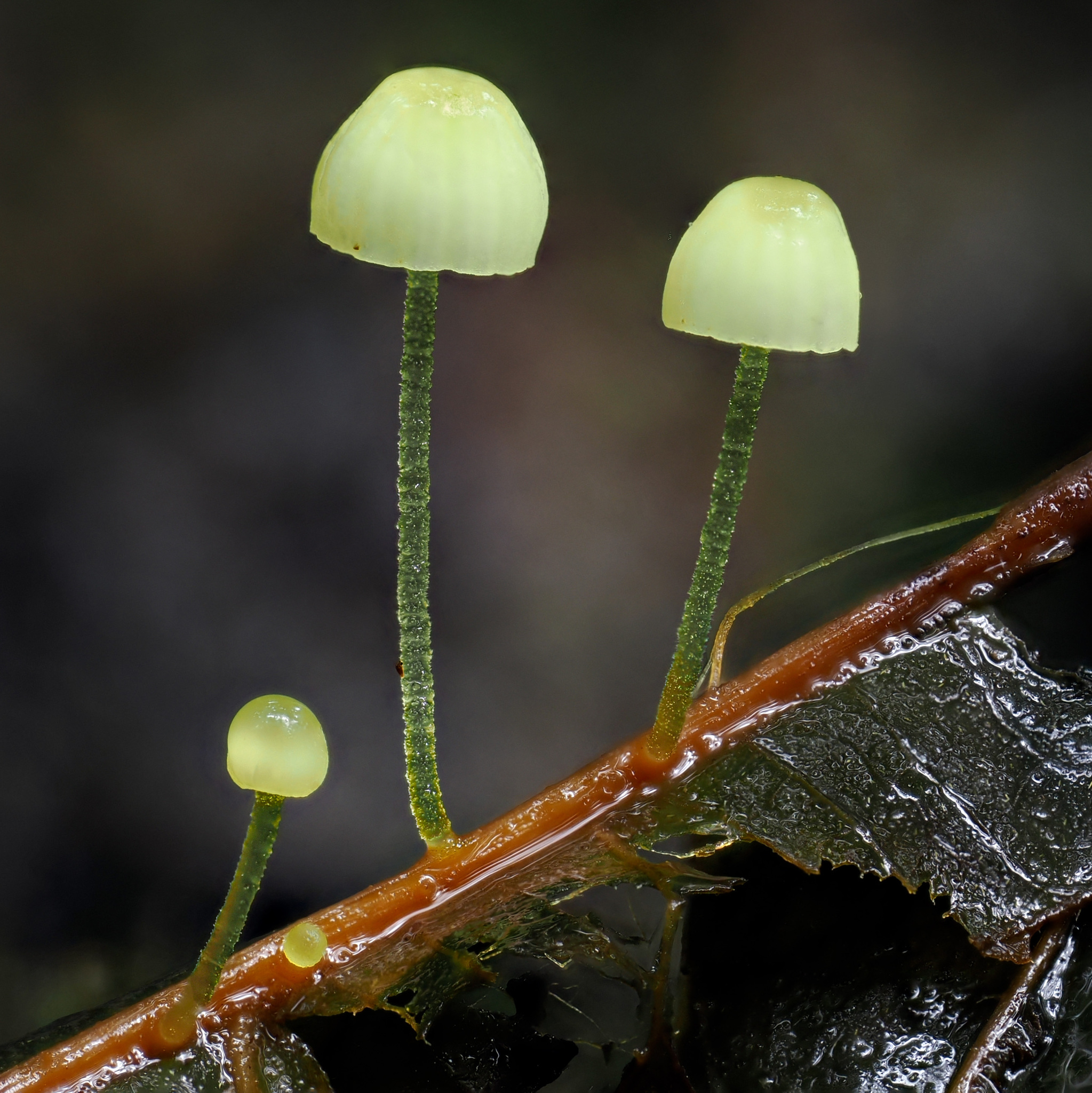

Scientific classification
- Kingdom: Fungi
- Division: Basidiomycota
- Class: Agaricomycetes
- Order: Agaricales
- Family: Mycenaceae
- Genus: Mycena
- Species: M. citricolor

Binomial name
- Mycena citricolor (Berk. & M.A.Curtis) Sacc. (1887)

Synonyms
- Agaricus citricolor Berk. & M.A.Curtis (1868); Omphalopsis citricolor (Berk. & M.A.Curtis) Murrill (1916); Omphalia citricolor (Berk. & M.A.Curtis) Rick (1938); Omphalia flavida Maubl. & Rangel (1914); Mycena flavida (Maubl. & Rangel) Singer (1951); Mycena tricolor Velen. (1920)

= Mycena citricolor =

Species of fungus

Mycena citricolor is a species of mushroom-forming fungus in the family Mycenaceae. It is a plant pathogen producing leaf spots on coffee plants. This fungus causes the disease commonly known as American Leaf Spot. Mycena citricolor affects coffee plants, primarily in Latin America, but can grow on other plants as well. This fungus can grow on all parts of the coffee plant including the leaves, stems and fruits. When grown on the leaves, Mycena citricolor results in leaves with holes that often fall from the plant. The fungus is a significant coffee crop pest having caused an estimated $60 million in losses during a 2010 epidemic.

== Description ==
The Mycena fungus can be identified growing on somewhat circular, brown spots on coffee leaves. The brown spots are caused by the presence of the parasitic fungus and by looking at the leaves closely, small mushrooms with luminescence can be seen. The fungi's luminescence is active in the presence and absence of light. Its luminescence is also affected by the temperature of its environment.

== See also ==
- List of bioluminescent fungi
