= Phoma caricae-papayae =

Scientific classification
- Domain: Eukaryota
- Kingdom: Fungi
- Division: Ascomycota
- Class: Dothideomycetes
- Order: Pleosporales
- Family: Didymellaceae
- Genus: Phoma
- Species: P. caricae-papayae

Binomial name
- Phoma caricae-papayae (Tarr) Punith. (1980)

Synonyms
- Ascochyta caricae-papayae Tarr, (1955)

Species of fungus

Phoma caricae-papayae is a fungal plant pathogen infecting papayas.
