= Ascochyta tritici =

Scientific classification
- Kingdom: Fungi
- Division: Ascomycota
- Class: Dothideomycetes
- Order: Pleosporales
- Family: Didymellaceae
- Genus: Ascochyta
- Species: A. tritici

Binomial name
- Ascochyta tritici Hori & Enjoji

Species of fungus

Ascochyta tritici is a fungal plant pathogen that causes Ascochyta leaf spot on barley, wheat and maize.

== See also ==
- List of Ascochyta species
