= List of chickpea diseases =

This is a list of diseases of chickpeas (Cicer arietinum)

Bacterial diseases
Bacterial blight	Xanthomonas campestris pv. cassiae
Bacterial leaf spot	Burkholderia andropogonis
Bacterial wilt	Xanthomonas campestris (Pam.) Dowson

Fungal diseases
Acrophialophora wilt	Acrophialophora fusispora
Alternaria blight	Alternaria alternata Alternaria tenuissima
Aphanomyces root rot	Aphanomyces euteiches
Ascochyta blight	Ascochyta rabiei (races 1, 2, 3, 4, 5, and 6); Mycosphaerella rabiei = Didymella rabiei [teleomorph]
Black root rot	Fusarium solani
Black streak root rot	Thielaviopsis basicola
Botrytis gray mold	Botrytis cinerea
Collar rot	Sclerotium rolfsii Athelia rolfsii = Corticium rolfsii [teleomorph]
Colletotrichum blight	Colletotrichum capsici Colletotrichum dematium
Cylindrocladium root rot	Cylindrocladium clavatum
Damping-off	Pythium debaryanum Pythium irregulare Pythium ultimum
Downy mildew	Peronospora sp.
Dry root rot	Macrophomina phaseolina = Rhizoctonia bataticola
Foot rot	Phacidiopycnis padwickii = Operculella padwickii
Fusarium root rot	Fusarium acuminatum Fusarium arthrosporioides Fusarium avenaceum Fusarium equiseti Fusarium solani f.sp. eumartii = Fusarium eumartii
Fusarium wilt	Fusarium oxysporum f.sp. ciceris (races 0, 1, 2, 3, 4, 5, and 6)
Myrothecium leaf spot	Myrothecium roridum
Mystrosporium leaf spot	Mystrosporium sp.
Neocosmospora root rot	Neocosmospora vasinfecta
Ozonium collar rot	Ozonium texanum var. parasiticum
Phoma blight	Phoma medicaginis
Phytophthora root rot	Phytophthora citrophthora Phytophthora cryptogea Phytophthora drechsleri Phytophthora megasperma
Pleospora leaf spot	Pleospora herbarum Stemphylium herbarum [anamorph]
Powdery mildew	Leveillula taurica Oidiopsis taurica [anamorph] Erysiphe sp.
Rust	Uromyces ciceris-arietini Uromyces striatus
Sclerotinia stem rot	Sclerotinia sclerotiorum Sclerotinia trifoliorum
Scopulariopsis leaf spot	Scopulariopsis brevicaulis
Seedling or seed rot	Aspergillus flavus Trichothecium roseum
Stemphylium blight	Stemphylium sarciniforme
Trichoderma foot rot	Trichoderma harzianum
Verticillium wilt	Verticillium albo-atrum Verticillium dahliae
Wet root rot	Rhizoctonia solani

== Nematodes, parasitic ==
Nematodes, parasitic
Dirty root (reniform nematode)	Rotylenchulus reniformis
Pearly root (cyst nematode)	Heterodera ciceri Heterodera rosii
Root-knot (root-knot nematode)	Meloidogyne arenaria Meloidogyne artiellia Meloidogyne incognita Meloidogyne javanica
Root lesion (root lesion nematode)	Pratylenchus brachyurus Pratylenchus thornei

== Viral diseases ==
Viral diseases
Bushy stunt	Chickpea bushy stunt virus
Distortion mosaic	Chickpea distortion mosaic virus
Filiform	Chickpea filiform virus
Mosaic	Alfalfa mosaic virus
Narrow leaf	Bean yellow mosaic virus
Necrosis	Lettuce necrotic yellows virus Pea streak virus
Proliferation	Cucumber mosaic virus
Stunt	Bean (pea) leaf roll virus
Yellowing	Pea enation mosaic virus

== Phytoplasmal diseases ==
Phytoplasmal diseases
Phyllody	Phytoplasma
