= List of lentil diseases =

This article is a list of diseases of lentils (Lens culinaris).

== Fungal diseases ==
Fungal diseases
Alternaria blight	Alternaria alternata Alternaria sp.
Anthracnose	Colletotrichum lindemuthianum Colletotrichum truncatum
Aphanomyces root rot	Aphanomyces euteiches
Ascochyta blight	Ascochyta fabae f.sp. lentis = Ascochyta lentis Didymella sp. [teleomorph]
Black root rot	Fusarium solani
Black streak root rot	Thielaviopsis basicola
Botrytis gray mold	Botrytis cinerea
Cercospora leaf spot	Cercospora cruenta Cercospora lentis Cercospora zonata
Collar rot	Sclerotium rolfsii Athelia rolfsii [teleomorph] = Corticium rolfsii
Cylindrosporium leaf spot and stem canker	Cylindrosporium sp.
Downy mildew	Peronospora lentis Peronospora viciae
Dry root rot	Macrophomina phaseolina = Rhizoctonia bataticola
Fusarium wilt	Fusarium oxysporum f.sp. lentis
Helminthosporium leaf spot	Helminthosporium sp.
Leaf rot	Choanephora sp.
Leaf yellowing	Cladosporium herbarum
Ozonium wilt	Ozonium texanum var. parasiticum
Phoma leaf spot	Phoma medicaginis
Powdery mildew	Erysiphe baeumleri Leveillula papilionacearum
Pythium root and seedling rot	Pythium aphanidermatum Pythium ultimum
Rust	Uromyces craccae Uromyces viciae-fabae = Uromyces fabae
Sclerotinia stem rot	Sclerotinia sclerotiorum
Stemphylium blight	Stemphylium botryosum Pleospora tarda [teleomorph] Stemphylium sarciniforme
Wet root rot	Rhizoctonia solani Thanatephorus cucumeris [teleomorph]

== Nematodes, parasitic ==
Nematodes, parasitic
Cyst nematode	Heterodera ciceri
Reniform nematode	Rotylenchulus reniformis
Root knot nematode	Meloidogyne incognita Meloidogyne javanica
Root lesion nematode	Pratylenchus spp.
Stem nematode	Ditylenchus dipsaci

== Viral diseases ==
Viral diseases
Bean (pea) leaf roll virus	Beet western yellows virus
Bean yellow mosaic	Bean yellow mosaic virus
Broad bean mottle	Broad bean mottle virus
Broad bean stain	Broad bean stain virus
Cucumber mosaic	Cucumber mosaic virus
Pea seedborne mosaic	Pea seed-borne mosaic virus
