= Fusarium oxysporum f.sp. radicis-lycopersici =

Scientific classification
- Domain: Eukaryota
- Kingdom: Fungi
- Division: Ascomycota
- Class: Sordariomycetes
- Order: Hypocreales
- Family: Nectriaceae
- Genus: Fusarium
- Species: F. oxysporum
- Forma specialis: F. o. f.sp. radicis-lycopersici

Trionomial name
- Fusarium oxysporum f.sp. radicis-lycopersici Jarvis & Shoemaker, (1979)

Fungal plant pathogen

Fusarium oxysporum f.sp. radicis-lycopersici is a fungal plant pathogen.

== Affected hosts ==
The host range (note that asymptomatic plants can still be hosts) is larger than Fusarium oxysporum lycopersici and includes:

Image	Family Name	Scientific name
	Anacardiaceae	Schinus terebinthifolius
	Cruciferae	Brassica juncea
	Cruciferae	B. oleracea (5 varieties)
	Cruciferae	Capsella bursa-pastoris
	Cucurbitaceae	Citrullus lanatus var. lanatus
	Leguminosae	Arachis hypogaea
	Leguminosae	Glycine max
	Leguminosae	Melilotus alba
	Leguminosae	Phaseolus vulgaris
	Leguminosae	Pisum sativum
	Leguminosae (Fabaceae, Trifolium)	Trifolium pratense
	Leguminosae (Fabaceae, Trifolium)	Trifolium repens
	Leguminosae (Fabaceae)	Vicia faba
	Molluginaceae	Mollugo verticillata
	Plantaginaceae	Plantago lanceolata
	Plantaginaceae	Scoparia
	Solanaceae	Capsicum frutescens
	Solanaceae	Solanum lycopersicum
	Solanaceae	Solanum melongena
	Umbelliferae	Apium graveolens
	Umbelliferae	Daucus carota
