= Fusarium oxysporum f.sp. momordicae =

Scientific classification
- Domain: Eukaryota
- Kingdom: Fungi
- Division: Ascomycota
- Class: Sordariomycetes
- Order: Hypocreales
- Family: Nectriaceae
- Genus: Fusarium
- Species: F. oxysporum
- Forma specialis: F. o. f.sp. momordicae

Trionomial name
- Fusarium oxysporum f.sp. momordicae S.K. Sun & J.W. Huang

Fungus

Fusarium oxysporum f.sp. momordicae is a fungal plant pathogen infecting bitter gourd (Momordica charantia), resulting in fusarium wilt. It is a forma specialis (f.sp.) of Fusarium oxysporum.
