= Fusarium oxysporum f.sp. medicaginis =

Scientific classification
- Domain: Eukaryota
- Kingdom: Fungi
- Division: Ascomycota
- Class: Sordariomycetes
- Order: Hypocreales
- Family: Nectriaceae
- Genus: Fusarium
- Species: F. oxysporum
- Forma specialis: F. o. f.sp. medicaginis

Trionomial name
- Fusarium oxysporum f.sp. medicaginis W.C. Snyder & H.N. Hansen, (1940)

Fungal plant pathogen

Fusarium oxysporum f.sp. medicaginis is a fungal plant pathogen infecting alfalfa.
