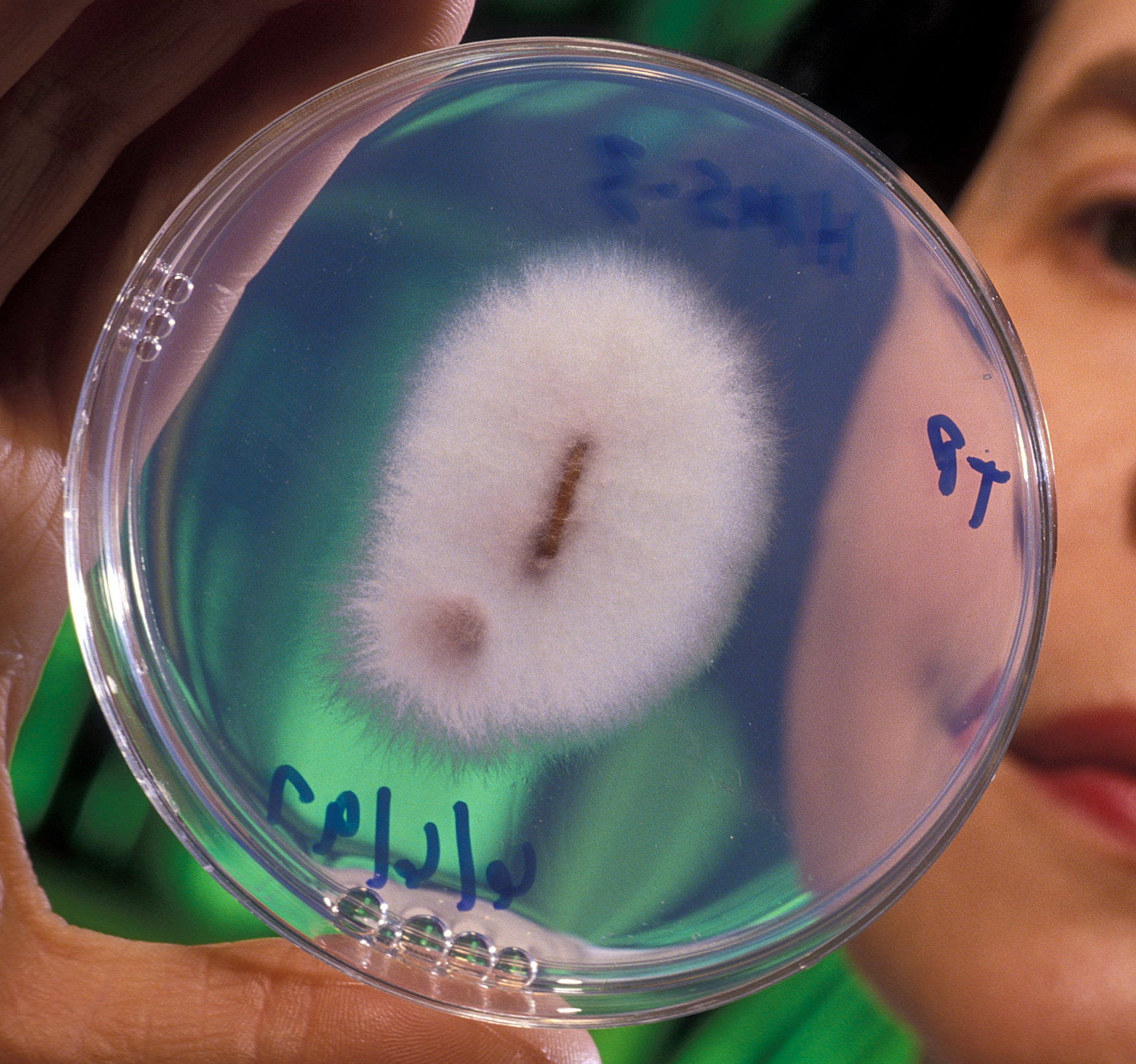

Scientific classification
- Kingdom: Fungi
- Division: Ascomycota
- Class: Sordariomycetes
- Order: Hypocreales
- Family: Nectriaceae
- Genus: Fusarium
- Species: F. oxysporum

Binomial name
- Fusarium oxysporum Schlecht. emend. Snyder & Hansen

= Fusarium oxysporum =

Species of fungus

Fusarium oxysporum (Schlecht as emended by Snyder and Hansen), an ascomycete fungus, comprises all the species, varieties and forms recognized by Wollenweber and Reinking within an infrageneric grouping called section Elegans. It is part of the family Nectriaceae.

Although their predominant role in native soils may be as harmless or even beneficial plant endophytes or soil saprophytes, many strains within the F. oxysporum complex are soil borne pathogens of plants, especially in agricultural settings.

== Taxonomy ==
While the species, as defined by Snyder and Hansen, has been widely accepted for more than 50 years, more recent work indicates this taxon is actually a genetically heterogeneous polytypic morphospecies, whose strains represent some of the most abundant and widespread microbes of the global soil microflora.

== Genomics ==
The Fot1 family of transposable elements is prevalent within the Fusarium oxysporum species complex, although its distribution varies among strains, with copy numbers ranging from zero to more than 100.

Two chromosome-level genome assemblies of F. oxysporum strains were published in 2026. The 57.6 Mb assembly of the biocontrol strain FO12 includes 14 chromosome-scale scaffolds among 46 total scaffolds, comprising 10 core and four accessory chromosomes; it has a BUSCO completeness of 99.6% and contains 16,068 predicted protein-coding genes. The gap-free, near telomere-to-telomere assembly of the tobacco root rot pathogen strain Fo-129 spans 52.9 Mb in 14 pseudochromosomes, comprising 11 core and three accessory chromosomes, plus one unanchored scaffold; it has a BUSCO completeness of 96.9% and contains 15,102 predicted protein-coding genes.

== Habitat ==
These diverse and adaptable fungi have been found in soils ranging from the Sonoran Desert, to tropical and temperate forest, grasslands and soils of the tundra. F. oxysporum strains are ubiquitous soil inhabitants that have the ability to exist as saprophytes, and degrade lignin and complex carbohydrates associated with soil debris. They are pervasive plant endophytes that can colonize plant roots and may even protect plants or form the basis of disease suppression.

Because the hosts of a given forma specialis usually are closely related, many have assumed that members of a forma specialis are also closely related and descended from a common ancestor. However, results from research conducted on Fusarium oxysporum f. sp. cubense forced scientists to question these assumptions. Researchers used anonymous, single-copy restriction fragment length polymorphsims (RFLPs) to identify 10 clonal lineages from a collection of F. oxysporum f.sp. cubense from across the world. These results showed that pathogens of banana causing Panama disease could be as closely related to other host's pathogens, such as melon or tomato, as they are to each other. Exceptional amounts of genetic diversity within F. oxysporum f.sp. cubense were deduced from the high level of chromosomal polymorphisms found among strains, random amplified polymorphic DNA fingerprints and from the number and geographic distribution of vegetative compatibility groups.

== Pathogen ==
Presented with the wide-ranging occurrence of F. oxysporum strains that are nonpathogenic, it is reasonable to conclude that certain pathogenic forms were descended from originally nonpathogenic ancestors. Given the association of these fungi with plant roots, a form that is able to grow beyond the cortex and into the xylem could exploit this ability and hopefully gain an advantage over fungi that are restricted to the cortex.

The progression of a fungus into vascular tissue may elicit an immediate host response, successfully restricting the invader; or an otherwise ineffective or delayed response, reducing the vital water-conducting capacity and induce wilting. On the other hand, the plant might be able to tolerate limited growth of the fungus within xylem vessels, preceded by an endophytic association. In this case, any further changes in the host or parasite could disturb the relationship, in a way that fungal activities or a host response would result in the generation of disease symptoms.

Pathogenic strains of F. oxysporum have been studied for more than 100 years. The host range of these fungi is broad and includes animals, ranging from arthropods to humans, as well as plants, including a range of both gymnosperms and angiosperms. While collectively, plant pathogenic F. oxysporum strains have a broad host range, individual isolates usually cause disease only in a narrow range of plant species. This observation has led to the idea of "special form" or forma specialis in F. oxysporum. Formae speciales have been defined as "…an informal rank in Classification… used for parasitic fungi characterized from a physiological standpoint (e.g. by the ability to cause disease in particular hosts) but scarcely or not at all from a morphological standpoint." Exhaustive host range studies have been conducted for relatively few formae speciales of F. oxysporum. For more information on Fusarium oxysporum as a plant pathogen, see Fusarium wilt and Koa wilt.

Different strains of F. oxysporum have been used for the purpose of producing nanomaterials (especially Silver nanoparticles).

== "Agent Green" in Colombia ==
In 2000, the government of Colombia reluctantly agreed to develop a mycoherbicide using strains of Fusarium oxysporum, also known as Agent Green, as a biological weapon to forcibly eradicate coca and other illegal crops. The weaponized strains were developed by the US government, who originally conditioned their approval of Plan Colombia on the use of this weapon, but ultimately withdrew the condition. Field tests were originally scheduled to take place in Colombia in 2000, but were halted due to international protests. In February 2001, the EU Parliament issued a declaration specifically against the use of these biological agents in warfare.

== Gold interactions ==
The fungus has the ability to dissolve gold, then precipitate it onto its surface, encrusting itself with gold. This phenomenon was first observed in Boddington, West Australia. As a result of this discovery, F. oxysporum is currently being evaluated as a possible way to help detect hidden underground gold reserves. It also is used to manufacture gold nanoparticles.

== Formae speciales ==
- Fusarium oxysporum f.sp. albedinis
- Fusarium oxysporum f.sp. asparagi
- Fusarium oxysporum f.sp. batatas
- Fusarium oxysporum f.sp. betae
- Fusarium oxysporum f.sp. cattleyae
- Fusarium oxysporum f.sp. cannabis
- Fusarium oxysporum f.sp. cepae
- Fusarium oxysporum f.sp. ciceris
- Fusarium oxysporum f.sp. citri
- Fusarium oxysporum f.sp. coffea
- Fusarium oxysporum f.sp. cubense
- Fusarium oxysporum f.sp. cyclaminis
- Fusarium oxysporum f.sp. herbemontis
- Fusarium oxysporum f.sp. dianthi
- Fusarium oxysporum f. sp. fragariae
- Fusarium oxysporum f.sp. gladioli
- Fusarium oxysporum f.sp. koae
- Fusarium oxysporum f.sp. lactucae
- Fusarium oxysporum f.sp. lentis
- Fusarium oxysporum f.sp. lilli
- Fusarium oxysporum f.sp. lini
- Fusarium oxysporum f.sp. lycopersici
- Fusarium oxysporum f.sp. medicaginis
- Fusarium oxysporum f.sp. melonis
- Fusarium oxysporum f.sp. momordicae
- Fusarium oxysporum f.sp. narcissi
- Fusarium oxysporum f.sp. nicotianae
- Fusarium oxysporum f.sp. niveum
- Fusarium oxysporum f.sp. palmarum
- Fusarium oxysporum f.sp. passiflorae
- Fusarium oxysporum f.sp. perniciosum
- Fusarium oxysporum f.sp. phaseoli
- Fusarium oxysporum f.sp. pisi
- Fusarium oxysporum f.sp. radicis-lycopersici
- Fusarium oxysporum f.sp. ricini
- Fusarium oxysporum f.sp. strigae
- Fusarium oxysporum f.sp. tuberosi
- Fusarium oxysporum f.sp. tulipae
- Fusarium oxysporum f.sp. vasinfectum

== See also ==
- Mycoherbicide
