= Fusarium oxysporum f.sp. cannabis =

Scientific classification
- Domain: Eukaryota
- Kingdom: Fungi
- Division: Ascomycota
- Class: Sordariomycetes
- Order: Hypocreales
- Family: Nectriaceae
- Genus: Fusarium
- Species: F. oxysporum
- Forma specialis: F. o. f.sp. cannabis

Trionomial name
- Fusarium oxysporum f.sp. cannabis Noviello & W.C. Snyder, (1962)

Fungal plant pathogen

Fusarium oxysporum f.sp. cannabis is a fungal plant pathogen infecting hemp.
