= Koa wilt =

Fusarium oxysporum f.sp. koae

Scientific classification
- Kingdom: Fungi
- Division: Ascomycota
- Class: Sordariomycetes
- Order: Hypocreales
- Family: Nectriaceae
- Genus: Fusarium
- Species: F. oxysporum
- Forma specialis: F. o. f.sp. koae

Trionomial name
- Fusarium oxysporum f.sp. koae Schlecht. emend. Snyder & Hansen

Fungal plant disease

Koa wilt is a relatively new disease to Hawaii, discovered in 1980. Koa wilt is caused by a forma specialis of the fungus Fusarium oxysporum, which is now abundant in Hawaiian soils and infects the native Acacia koa tree, a once-dominant species in the canopy of Hawaiian forests. Fusarium oxysporum f.sp. koae is believed to have been brought into Hawaii on an ornamental acacia plant. Fusarium fungi clog the tree xylem, causing significant wilt and mortality among Koa trees. Due to their cultural importance, Koa wilt is one of the environmental issues of Hawaii.

== Hosts and symptoms ==
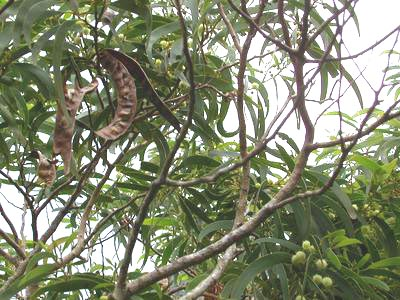
Upper branches of a healthy koa tree, showing the bark, sickle-shaped phyllodes, greenish rounded flower heads, and seedpods

The host for Koa wilt is Acacia koa, a tree that is native and endemic to the Hawaiian islands. It ranges in size from 15 to greater than 50 feet with a canopy spread of 20 to 40 feet. It has a showy white flower and blooms sporadically. Mature leaves are sickle shaped.

Koa wilt is typically a fatal pathogen for its host. In only a few months, a tree may lose its entire canopy and die. Trees less than fifteen years old are typically the most susceptible. Symptoms include stains in cambium, roots, and sapwood as well as chlorosis (yellowing), canopy dieback, brown and wilted leaves, oozing sap, and bark cankers.

== Disease cycle ==
The Koa wilt pathogen was first described by Gardner as a new forma specialis, Fusarium oxysporum. f. sp. koae. The soil-borne F. oxysporum reproduces only asexually. F. oxysporum produces three types of asexual spores: microconidia, macroconidia, and chlamydospores. Microconidia are the spore types most often produced by this fungus under all conditions, as well as the spores produced in the xylem. The macroconidia are found on dead plant tissue surfaces as well as in groups that look like sporodochia. The chlamydospores are round, resting spores, produced on older mycelium or in macroconidia. Mycelium enters the roots and travels into the vascular xylem where it starts to produce microconidia, eventually clogging the xylem. Once the Koa tree dies, the fungus invades all tissues and, upon reaching the dead plant surface, sporulates profusely producing macroconidia and chlamydospores. The fungus can survive saprophytically in the soil, as either mycelium or as any of its three spore types mentioned. The chlamydospores, as the resting spores, survive the longest in the soils, usually under cold conditions.

== Environment ==
Koa trees occupy dry to mesic areas on the islands of Kauaʻi, Oʻahu, Molokaʻi, Lānaʻi, Maui, and Hawaiʻi in elevations of 80 to 8,000 feet with 0 to 100 inches of rain. They are a dominant forest species. Koa wilt has been found on the islands of Kauaʻi, Oʻahu, Maui, and Hawaiʻi. Most diseased trees are found at elevations below 3,000 feet. However, it has also been observed at elevations as high as 7,000 feet. Fusarium, the primary cause of Koa wilt, may be found in a variety of environments but thrives with the high temperatures and moist soils of Hawaii. It survives in the soil.

== Management ==
Fusarium oxysporum is a soil-borne pathogen, and currently sanitation, controlling the initial inoculum, is the best means to control it. One should avoid bringing infected soil or plant tissues into disease free areas. Make certain that all tools and equipment have been cleaned and sterilized after contact with infected sites and plants. New plantings should be in areas known to be free of the pathogen, and the soils should be screened to ensure that no F. oxysporum is present. Seeds are not usually infected, but there is a slight risk and therefore only seeds that are from local, clean, superior trees should be used. Seedlings should be started in soil-less media, although there is still a risk of wind-borne pathogen contamination. When planting in areas where there are no local hosts, it is suggested that one plant seeds from several different sources in the hope of finding a resistant tree. Currently, research about Koa wilt is focused primarily on determining resistant Koa varieties.

== Importance ==
Koa is a commodity, a dominant native forest species, and an important element of Hawaiian culture. Koa is highly prized hardwood that can sell for prices as high as $150 a board foot, a special measurement indicating one-foot by one-foot by one-inch wood piece. Koa is currently being grown on plantations to support this high demand, yet some plantations have a 90% tree mortality rate over several years due to Koa wilt. It is also a legume, giving it the ability to form symbiosis with nitrogen fixing bacteria, which has led to efforts to use koa in agroecological systems with crops such as coffee and cacao.

Ecologically, koa is an important species because it is one of the few native trees that remains dominant in alien mixed forests on the Hawaiian Islands. Invasive species make up the majority of the State's current plant population. Koa trees also are important because provide a habitat for many native bird species. Historically, there were once two species of koa-finches, Rhodacanthis palmeri and R. flaviceps, which fed on green koa seed pods. These species are now extinct due to habitat loss and avian malaria. It is important to preserve the remaining koa populations to helpt to avoid further native bird extinctions.

Koa also has great cultural importance for native Hawaiians. The name “koa” means "brave, bold, fearless" or "warrior" in Hawaiian. Koa wood was used extensively in ancient Hawaiian society for constructing houses, spears, tools, canoe paddles, kahili (feathered standards of royalty), calabashes, ceremonies, and surfboards. Canoes were, and still are, carved from the trunks of koa trees. Outrigger canoe racing, often in koa canoes, is still a popular and highly competitive sport of cultural significance.
