= Fusarium oxysporum f.sp. betae =

Scientific classification
- Kingdom: Fungi
- Division: Ascomycota
- Class: Sordariomycetes
- Order: Hypocreales
- Family: Nectriaceae
- Genus: Fusarium
- Species: F. oxysporum
- Forma specialis: F. o. f.sp. betae

Trionomial name
- Fusarium oxysporum f.sp. betae W.C. Snyder & H.N. Hansen

Synonyms
- Fusarium conglutinans var. betae D. Stewart, (1931); Fusarium orthoceras var. betae (D. Stewart) Padwick, (1940); Fusarium oxysporum f. betae (D. Stewart) W.C. Snyder & H.N. Hansen, (1940)

Fungal plant pathogen

Fusarium oxysporum f.sp. betae is a destructive fungal plant pathogen. It causes Fusarium yellows or fusarium wilt, characterized by yellowing and dwarfing.

== Hosts and symptoms ==
Fusarium oxysporum has multiple formae speciales each assigned to a particular host. Fusarium oxysporum f.sp. betae is very host specific to sugar beet. The disease that this pathogen causes is fusarium yellows or fusarium wilt. Fusarium oxysporum f.sp. betae is a type of fungus whose spores survive in the soil. The symptoms of Fusarium oxysporum f.sp. betae are yellowing between the large veins, chlorosis, wilting, and necrosis of leaves. The pathogen is xylem limited and soil-borne, so by definition it affects the vascular tissue of the roots in order to gain access to the vascular system of the host. This leads to symptoms such as discoloration, chlorosis, and wilting because the pathogen acts as a plug blocking transportation of water and nutrients to the rest of the sugar beet.

== Management ==
One mode of management is crop rotation, but there is differing effectiveness rates shown in the literature. One article suggests that rotating crops would reduce the number of overwintering spores in the soil. But another journal deems crop rotation ineffective because the pathogen can live on other crops in the rotation and appear asymptomatic. If you are only relying on this form of management, you should be performing sanitation measures on field equipment, as to not spread the disease. Fungicide is not an effective management practice. The most effective practice is to plant early in the season when the soil is at a cool temperature. Unnecessary irrigations should also be avoided, giving the fungal spores the least amount of water possible. A sugar beet with resistance would be a good option, but there are no such cultivars available for farmers to buy.

== Environment ==
The presence of the pathogen Fusarium oxysporum f.sp. betae is amplified by high temperatures found during planting season. It was found that temperatures 24 °C and higher led to a proliferation of the pathogen, Fusarium oxysporum f.sp. betae. There seems to be an optimal temperature, 25 °C, for the fungal spores to grow. Because fusarium yellows is caused by a fungal pathogen, high moisture conditions are optimal for the pathogen to infect the sugar beets. An ecosystem that is most beneficial to this pathogen is a low-lying field in high moisture conditions. The spores can multiply and infect at the greatest rate when there is a lot of water present. In addition, Fusarium oxysporum f.sp. betae is a xylem limited disease, therefore it needs water to be able to infect the rest of the plant once it gets into the roots. Another way the environment takes effect on the rate of disease is in soil conditions. This is due to the fact that Fusarium oxysporum f.sp. betae is a soil-borne pathogen. The rate of disease is affected by an ever-changing triangle between the fungal growth of Fusarium oxysporum f.sp. betae, physical and environmental factors in the soil, and rate of plant root growth.
