= Fusarium oxysporum f.sp. cyclaminis =

Scientific classification
- Domain: Eukaryota
- Kingdom: Fungi
- Division: Ascomycota
- Class: Sordariomycetes
- Order: Hypocreales
- Family: Nectriaceae
- Genus: Fusarium
- Species: F. oxysporum
- Forma specialis: F. o. f.sp. cyclaminis

Trionomial name
- Fusarium oxysporum f.sp. cyclaminis Gerlach, (1954)

Synonyms
- Fusarium aurantiacum Corda, (1828)

Fungal plant pathogen

Fusarium oxysporum f.sp. cyclaminis is a fungal plant pathogen infecting cyclamens.
