= Fusarium oxysporum f.sp. citri =

Scientific classification
- Domain: Eukaryota
- Kingdom: Fungi
- Division: Ascomycota
- Class: Sordariomycetes
- Order: Hypocreales
- Family: Nectriaceae
- Genus: Fusarium
- Species: F. oxysporum
- Forma specialis: F. o. f.sp. citri

Trionomial name
- Fusarium oxysporum f.sp. citri Timmer et al.{?}

Fungal plant pathogen

Fusarium oxysporum f.sp. citri is a fungus which reproduces by cell fission. It is a well known plant pathogen infecting citruses.
