= Fusarium wilt =

Fungal plant disease

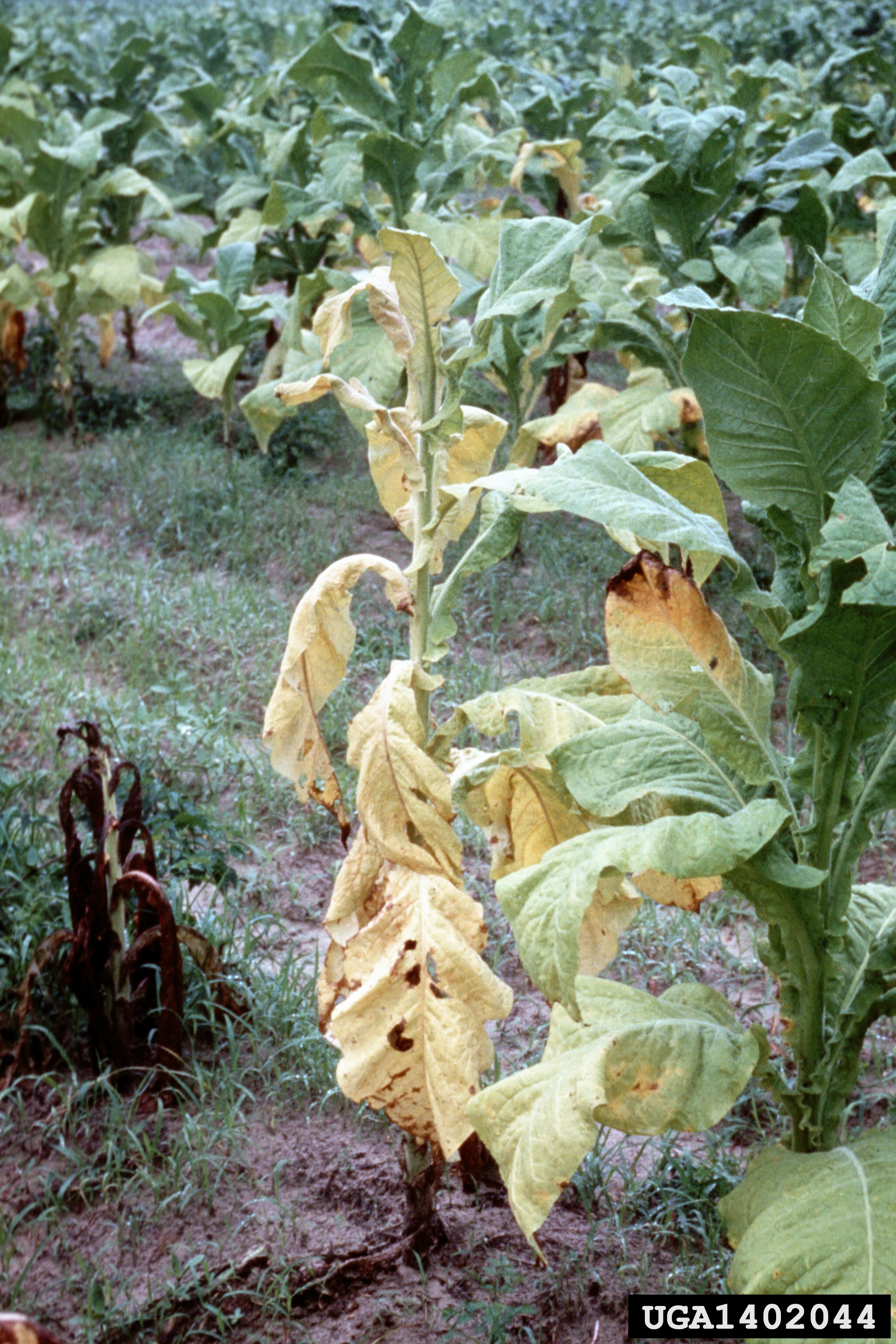
- A tobacco plant suffering from Fusarium wilt
- Causal agents: Fusarium oxysporum
- Hosts: Cannabis, Tomato, tobacco, legumes, cucurbits, cotton, sweet potatoes and banana
- EPPO Code: FUSAOX

Fusarium wilt is a common vascular wilt fungal disease, exhibiting symptoms similar to Verticillium wilt. This disease has been investigated extensively since the early years of this century. The pathogen that causes Fusarium wilt is Fusarium oxysporum (F. oxysporum). The species is further divided into formae speciales based on host plant.

== Hosts and symptoms ==
The fungal pathogen Fusarium oxysporum affects a wide variety of hosts of any age. Tomato, tobacco, legumes, cucurbits, sweet potatoes and banana are a few of the most susceptible plants, but it also infects other herbaceous plants. F. oxysporum generally produces symptoms such as wilting, chlorosis, necrosis, premature leaf drop, browning of the vascular system, stunting and damping-off. The most important of these is vascular wilt. Fusarium wilt starts out looking like vein clearing on the younger leaves and drooping of the older lower leaves, followed by stunting, yellowing of the lower leaves, defoliation, marginal necrosis and plant death. On older plants, symptoms are more distinct between the blossoming and fruit maturation stages.

F. oxysporum is split into divisions called formae speciales (singular forma specialis, abbreviated f.sp.). Over 100 formae speciales divisions are identified, each with one or two different races. Each forma specialis within the species are host-specific (i.e. specific to a certain plant) and produce different symptoms:

F. oxysporum f. sp. batatas affects sweet potato. The symptoms include leaf chlorosis, stunting, and leaf drop. It is transmitted through the soil and through vascular wounds in plant material.

Fusarium oxysporum f. sp. canariensis causes wilt of Canary Island date palm and other propagated palms. The disease is spread through contaminated seed, soil and pruning tools.

F. oxysporum f. sp. cubense causes Panama disease on banana. It is found everywhere bananas are grown in Africa, Asia, Central and South America. It attacks banana plants of all ages and spreads mainly through the soil. It causes wilting and yellowing of the leaves.

F. oxysporum f. sp. lycopersici causes vascular wilt in tomato. The disease starts out as yellowing and drooping on one side of the plant. Leaf wilting, plant stunting, browning of the vascular system, leaf death and lack of fruit production also occur.

F. oxysporum f. sp. melonis attacks muskmelon and cantaloupe. It causes damping-off in seedlings and causes chlorosis, stunting and wilting in old plants. Necrotic streaks can appear on the stems.

== Disease cycle ==
F. oxysporum is the most widely dispersed of the Fusarium species and is found worldwide. F. oxysporum has no known sexual stage, but produces three types of asexual spores: microconidia, macroconidia, and chlamydospores. The microconidia are the most abundantly produced spores. They are oval, elliptical or kidney shaped and produced on aerial mycelia. Macroconidia, which have three to five cells and have gradually pointed or curved edges, are found on sporodochia on the surface of diseased plant (in culture the sporodochia may be sparse or nonexistent). Chlamydospores are usually formed singly or in pairs, but can sometimes be found in clusters or in short chains. They are round thick walled spores produced within or terminally on an older mycelium or in macroconidia. Chlamydospores unlike the other spores can survive in the soil for a long period of time.

F. oxysporum is a common soil pathogen and saprophyte that feeds on dead and decaying organic matter. It survives in the soil debris as a mycelium and all spore types, but is most commonly recovered from the soil as chlamydospores. This pathogen spreads in two basic ways: it spreads short distances by water splash, and by planting equipment, and long distances by infected transplants and seeds. F. oxysporum infects a healthy plant by means of mycelia or by germinating spores penetrating the plant's root tips, root wounds, or lateral roots. The mycelium advances intracellularly through the root cortex and into the xylem. Once in the xylem, the mycelium remains exclusively in the xylem vessels and produces microconidia (asexual spores). The microconidia are able to enter into the sap stream and are transported upward. Where the flow of the sap stops the microconidia germinate. Eventually the spores and the mycelia clog the vascular vessels, which prevents the plant from up-taking and translocating nutrients. In the end the plant transpires more than it can transport, the stomata close, the leaves wilt, and the plant dies. After the plant dies the fungus invades all tissues, sporulates, and continues to infect neighboring plants.

== Environment ==
As previously stated F. oxysporum is a common soil saprophyte that infects a wide host range of plant species around the world. It has the ability to survive in most soil—arctic, tropical, desert, cultivated and non-cultivated. Though Fusarium oxysporum may be found in many places and environments, development of the disease is favored by high temperatures and warm moist soils. The optimum temperature for growth on artificial media is between 25 and 30 °C, and the optimum soil temperature for root infection is 30 °C or above. However, infection through the seed can occur at temperatures as low as 14 °C.

== Management ==
F. oxysporum is a major wilt pathogen of many economically important crop plants. It is a soil-borne pathogen, which can live in the soil for long periods of time, so rotational cropping is not a useful control method. It can also spread through infected dead plant material, so cleaning up at the end of the season is important.

One control method is to improve soil conditions because F. oxysporum spreads faster through soils that have high moisture and bad drainage. Other control methods include planting resistant varieties, removing infected plant tissue to prevent overwintering of the disease, using soil and systemic fungicides to eradicate the disease from the soil, flood fallowing, and using clean seeds each year. Applying fungicides depends on the field environment. It is difficult to find a biological control method because research in a greenhouse can have different effects than testing in the field. The best control method found for F. oxysporum is planting resistant varieties, although not all have been bred for every forma specialis.

F. oxysporum f. sp. batatas can be controlled by using clean seed, cleaning up infected leaf and plant material and breeding for resistance. Fungicides can also be used, but are not as effective as the other two because of field conditions during application. Fungicides can be used effectively by dip treating propagation material.

Different races of F. oxysporum f. sp. cubense, Panama disease on banana, can be susceptible, resistant and partially resistant. It can be controlled by breeding for resistance and through eradication and quarantine of the pathogen by improving soil conditions and using clean plant material. Biological control can work using antagonists. Systemic and soil fungicides can also be used.

The main control method for F. oxysporum f. sp. lycopersici, vascular wilt on tomato, is resistance. Other effective control methods are fumigating the infected soil and raising the soil pH to 6.5-7.

The most effective way to control F. oxysporum f. sp. melonis is to graft a susceptible variety of melon to a resistant root-stock. Resistant cultivars, liming the soil to change soil pH to 6–7, and reducing soil nitrogen levels also help control F. oxysporum f. sp. melonis.

The fungus Trichoderma viride is a biocontrol agent that has proven to control this disease in an environmentally friendly manner. It can also manage Fusarium wilt in cucumber, tomato, and various other crops.

F.oxysporum f. sp. radicis-cucumerinum is responsible for the root and stem rot of cucumbers (Cucumis sativus). Management of F.oxysporum f. sp. radicis-cucumerinum has been effective by methyl bromide fumigation.

== Importance ==
Because F. oxysporum is so widespread, it is a significant problem in many crops. It is economically damaging to the banana industry, and the threat of more virulent strains or mutations to damage previously resistant crops is of major concern. F. oxysporum also causes damage to many crops from the family Solanaceae, including potato, tomato, and pepper. Yield losses of affected crops can be high, up to 45% yield loss of tomato crop has been reported in India. Other commercially important plants affected include basil, beans, carnation, chrysanthemum, peas, and watermelon. Woody ornamentals are infected, but are usually not killed by Fusarium wilt alone. Palms, however, are the exception, and there are many species that can die from F. oxysporum infection. Fusarium wilt's importance as a damaging disease on strawberry production is increasing. In South Korea, where Fusarium wilt is the most serious soil-borne disease of strawberry, losses in transplant production of up to 30% have been reported.

There is growing interest in using Fusarium wilt as a form of biological control. Certain pathogenic strains of F. oxysporum could be released to infect and control invasive weed species. This type of control (called a mycoherbicide) would be more targeted than herbicide applications, without the associated problems of chemical use. In addition. F. oxysporum may compete with other soil fungi that act as pathogens of important crops. Introducing specific strains of F. oxysporum that are not pathogenic (or non-infectious mutants of pathogens) to nearby crops could take nutrients from other potential disease-causing fungi.

Fusarium wilt (Panama disease) is the most serious disease of banana, threatening 80% of the world's banana production, most of which is planted with the susceptible Cavendish varieties. Bananas are a staple food in the diet of millions throughout the subtropics and tropics, and the spread of Panama disease could have devastating effects on both large scale production and subsistence farms.

== Origin ==
Members of F. oxysporum are present throughout the world's soils. However, before global transportation, many of the different varieties of the pathogen were isolated. Now, global trade has spread F. oxysporum inoculum with the crop. A recent example of this is the spread of Fusarium oxysporum f.sp. cubense which may have originated in Asia and just recently has appeared in banana producing areas in the South Pacific.

Inoculum can originate from many sources. F. oxysporum conidia and chlamydospores can attach to the outside of seeds. Commercial seed companies must practice proper sanitation techniques, or the seed can carry its own inoculum to the grower's field. This has been demonstrated with the seeds of various legumes, tomatoes, sugarbeet, aster, oil palm, and more. Vegetative cuttings can also carry inoculum or the live pathogen. Importantly, plants used for cuttings carrying no outward symptoms of infection may still transmit the pathogen. This has become a problem in some greenhouse floral crops like Chrysanthemum and Carnation. The pathogen's sporodochia and other inoculum sources may also be spread by soil movement and shipment of nonhost plants carried with infected soil.

Certain rare soils are said to be "Fusarium-suppressive," that is, given two soils with high populations of infective F. oxysporum in the soil and the proper hosts, one soil will have a lower incidence of Fusarium wilt. Study of these soils is ongoing, but the decreased disease rate is thought to be due to other soil flora.

== See also ==
- Fusarium
- Panama disease - Fusarium wilt of banana
