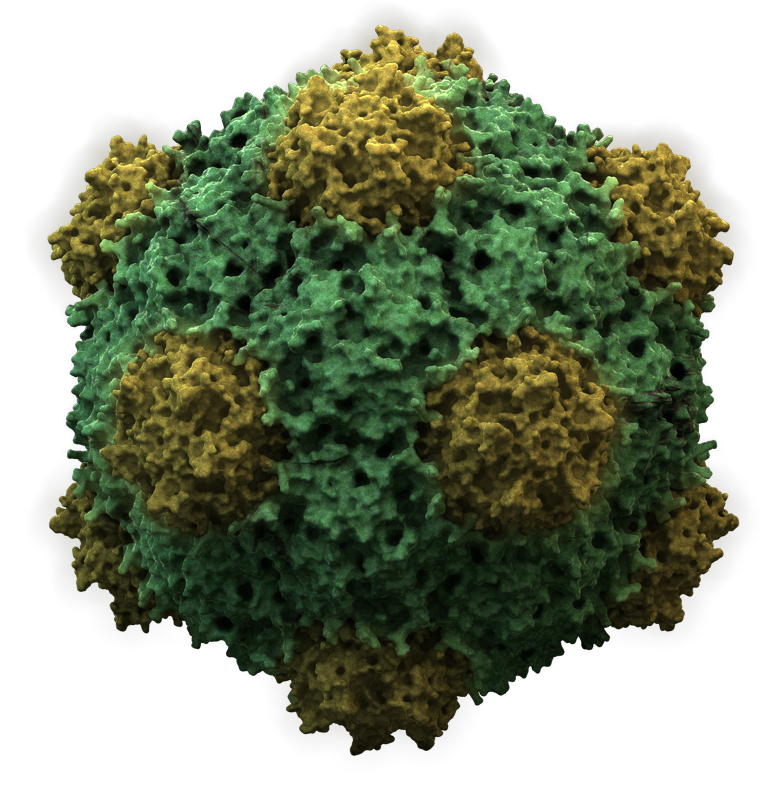
- Structure of the Cowpea mosaic virus based on PDB 2BFU

Virus classification
- (unranked): Virus
- Realm: Riboviria
- Kingdom: Orthornavirae
- Phylum: Pisuviricota
- Class: Pisoniviricetes
- Order: Picornavirales
- Family: Secoviridae
- Subfamily: Comovirinae
- Genus: Comovirus

= Comovirus =

Genus of viruses

Comovirus is a genus of viruses in the order Picornavirales, in the family Secoviridae, in the subfamily Comovirinae. Plants serve as natural hosts. There are 21 species in this genus.

== Taxonomy ==
The genus contains the following species, listed by scientific name and followed by the exemplar virus of the species:

- Comovirus andesense, Andean potato mottle virus
- Comovirus arabidopsis, Arabidopsis latent virus 1
- Comovirus capsici, Pepper mild mosaic virus
- Comovirus cardaminis, White-flower bittercress comovirus
- Comovirus caricae, Papaya comovirus
- Comovirus cucurbitae, Squash mosaic virus
- Comovirus fabae, Broad bean true mosaic virus
- Comovirus glycinis, Glycine mosaic virus
- Comovirus musivi, Pea mild mosaic virus
- Comovirus phaseoli, Phaseolus vulgaris severe mosaic virus
- Comovirus pisi, Pea green mottle virus
- Comovirus rapae, Turnip ringspot virus
- Comovirus raphani, Radish mosaic virus
- Comovirus rugomusivum, Bean rugose mosaic virus
- Comovirus severum, Cowpea severe mosaic virus
- Comovirus siliquae, Bean pod mottle virus
- Comovirus strophostylis, Quail pea mosaic virus
- Comovirus trifolii, Red clover mottle virus
- Comovirus ulluci, Ullucus virus C
- Comovirus viciae, Broad bean stain virus
- Comovirus vignae, Cowpea mosaic virus

== Structure ==
Viruses in Comovirus are non-enveloped, with icosahedral geometries, and T=pseudo3 symmetry. The diameter is around 28-30 nm. Genomes are linear and segmented, bipartite, around 24-7kb in length.

Genus	Structure	Symmetry	Capsid	Genomic arrangement	Genomic segmentation
Comovirus	Icosahedral	Pseudo T=3	Non-enveloped	Linear	Segmented

== Life cycle ==
Viral replication is cytoplasmic. Entry into the host cell is achieved by penetration into the host cell. Replication follows the positive stranded RNA virus replication model. Positive stranded rna virus transcription is the method of transcription. The virus exits the host cell by tubule-guided viral movement. Plants serve as the natural host. The virus is transmitted via a vector (beetle). Transmission routes are vector and mechanical.

Genus	Host details	Tissue tropism	Entry details	Release details	Replication site	Assembly site	Transmission
Comovirus	Plants	None	Viral movement; mechanical inoculation	Viral movement	Cytoplasm	Cytoplasm	Mechanical inoculation: beetles
