= Pea mild mosaic virus =

Virus classification
- (unranked): Virus
- Realm: Riboviria
- Kingdom: Orthornavirae
- Phylum: Pisuviricota
- Class: Pisoniviricetes
- Order: Picornavirales
- Family: Secoviridae
- Genus: Comovirus
- Species: Comovirus musivi

Species of virus

Pea mild mosaic virus (PmiMV) is a plant pathogenic virus of the family Secoviridae.
