= Radish mosaic virus =

Virus classification
- (unranked): Virus
- Realm: Riboviria
- Kingdom: Orthornavirae
- Phylum: Pisuviricota
- Class: Pisoniviricetes
- Order: Picornavirales
- Family: Secoviridae
- Genus: Comovirus
- Species: Comovirus raphani

Synonyms
- Radish enation mosaic virus

Species of virus

Radish mosaic virus (RaMV) is a plant pathogenic virus of the genus Comovirus.
