= Vicia orientalis =

Conservation status
- Least Concern (IUCN 3.1)

Scientific classification
- Kingdom: Plantae
- Clade: Tracheophytes
- Clade: Angiosperms
- Clade: Eudicots
- Clade: Rosids
- Order: Fabales
- Family: Fabaceae
- Subfamily: Faboideae
- Genus: Vicia
- Species: V. orientalis

Binomial name
- Vicia orientalis (Boiss.) Bég. & Diratz.

Synonyms
- List: Ervum boissieri Boiss.; Ervum cyaneum Boiss. & Hohen.; Ervum orientale Boiss.; Lens culinaris subsp. orientalis (Boiss.) Ponert; Lens cyanea Alef.; Lens esculenta var. schnittspahnii (Alef.) Alef.; Lens orientalis (Boiss.) Hand.-Mazz.; Lens schnittspahnii Alef.; Lens schnittspahnii var. indica Alef.; Lens schnittspahnii var. persica Alef.; Vicia lens subsp. orientalis (Boiss.) Galasso, Banfi, Bartolucci & J.-M.Tison

Species of plant

Vicia orientalis (many authorities continue to use its synonym Lens orientalis), is a species of flowering plant in the family Fabaceae. It is native to the Caucasus, southeastern Greece, the Middle East, Central Asia, and Pakistan. An annual, it is found in wide variety of habitats at elevations from 450 to 1,500 m (1,500 to 4,900 ft). It is the wild progenitor of Vicia lens, the lentil. Under its synonym Lens orientalis it has been assessed as Least Concern.
