= Fusarium oxysporum f.sp. batatas =

Scientific classification
- Domain: Eukaryota
- Kingdom: Fungi
- Division: Ascomycota
- Class: Sordariomycetes
- Order: Hypocreales
- Family: Nectriaceae
- Genus: Fusarium
- Species: F. oxysporum
- Forma specialis: F. o. f.sp. batatas

Trionomial name
- Fusarium oxysporum f.sp. batatas W.C. Snyder & H.N. Hansen, (1940)

Synonyms
- Fusarium batatas Wollenw. [as batatae], (1914); Fusarium bulbigenum var. batatas Wollenw., (1931); Fusarium oxysporum f. batatas (Wollenw.) W.C. Snyder & H.N. Hansen, (1940)

Fungal plant pathogen

Fusarium oxysporum f.sp. batatas is a fungal plant pathogen infecting sweet potatoes.
