= Spring black stem =

Plant fungal disease

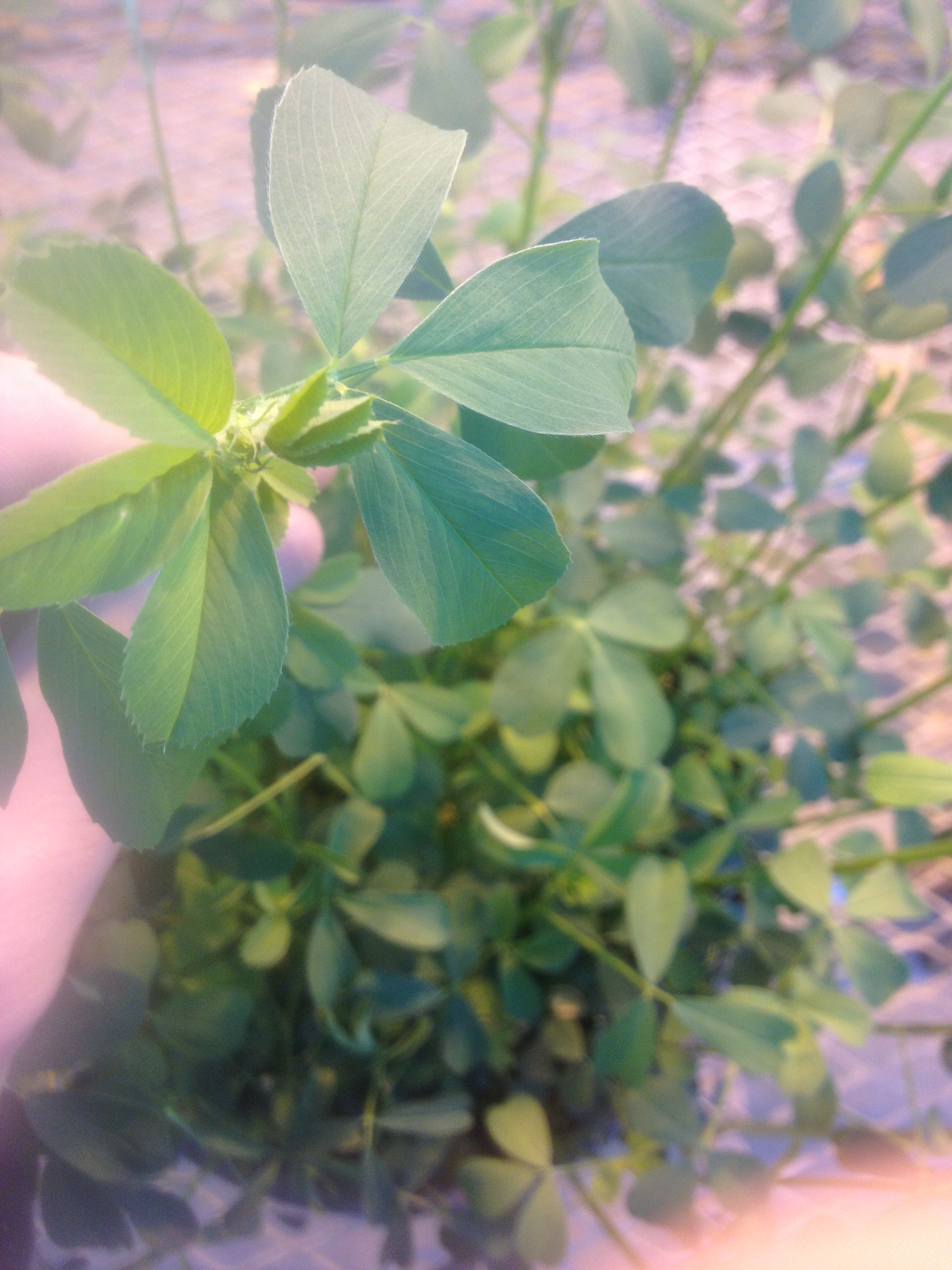
- Host Alfalfa of Spring Black Stem
- Common names: Black stem of lucerne
- Causal agents: Phoma medicaginis
- Hosts: alfalfa
- EPPO Code: PHOMME

Spring Black Stem is a common fungal, foliar disease caused by Ascochyta medicaginicola (syn. Phoma medicaginis). Spring Black Stem is most commonly found in alfalfa, but also attacks certain clovers. The fungus survives in stubble from previous cuttings and spreads easily by rain splash, running water, and equipment. The disease is present in numerous alfalfa fields throughout the Northeast United States.

== Host and symptoms ==
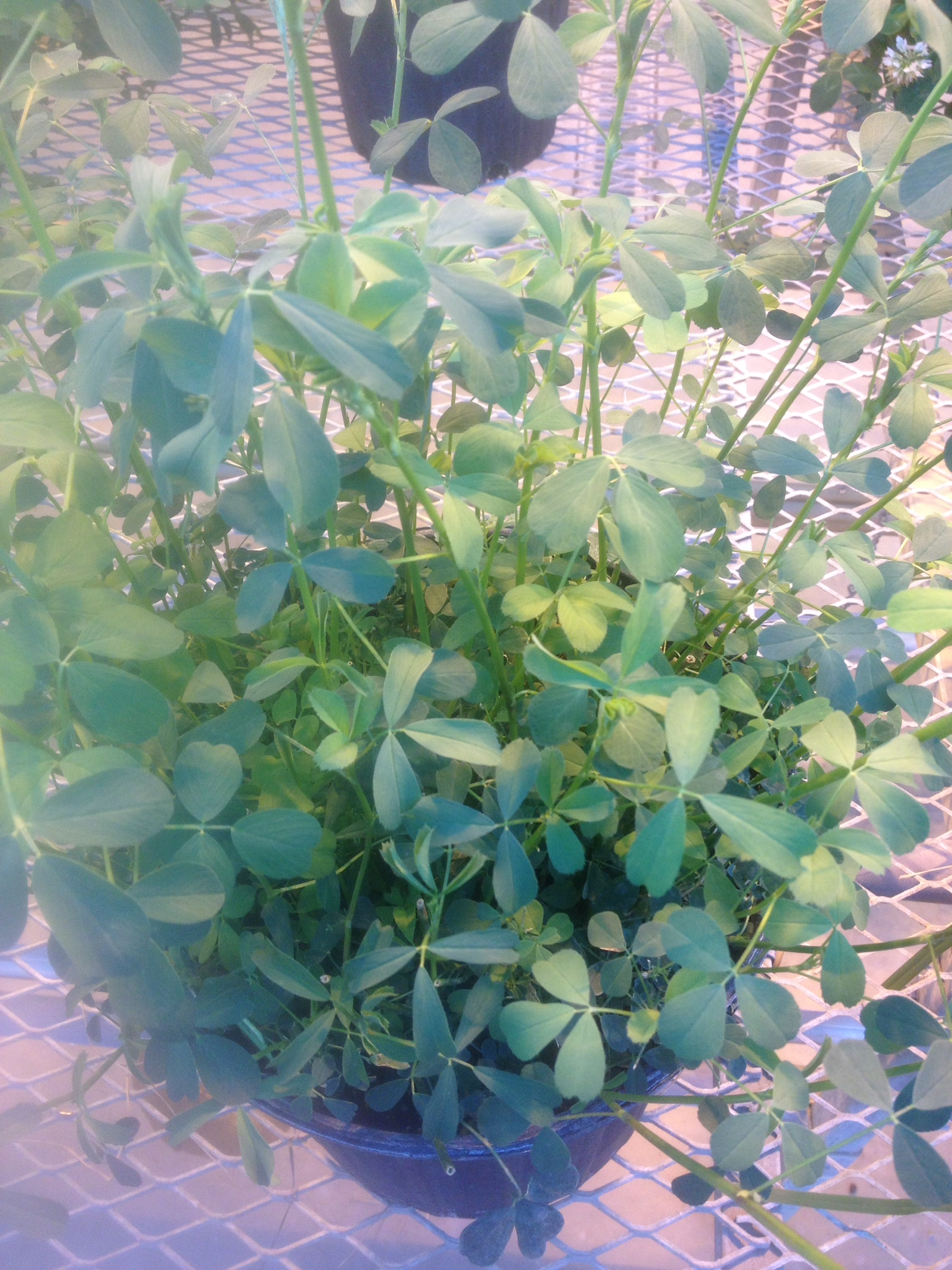
Another view of the host Alfalfa of Spring Black Stem

The fungal pathogen Phoma medicaginis attacks the host alfalfa. Numerous spots develop on the lower leaves, petioles, and stems. The disease produces small black spots on the leaves which eventually turn the leaf yellow, resulting in chlorosis and eventually cell death. Spots are usually worse on older leaves. Stem lesions are dark brown to black and may cut the stem all the way around its surface. Lesions on stems enlarge and may blacken large areas near the base of the plant. Affected stems are brittle and easily broken. When at its worst, entire stems can be blackened and killed. This can cause spread of the disease to the crowns and roots, also turning them black. When the fungus extends into the crown and root, it can cause crown and root rot.

== Disease cycle ==
Phoma medicaginis overwinters as mycelium in old stems and fallen leaves, where small pimple-like structures form, called pycnidia, the asexual fruiting body. In spring, many pycnidiospores are released and dispersed by the presence of free water. The small distance dispersal occurs by water splash and dew, while it is spread further distances by wind, insects, infected seed from the host, and human activities. Spores germinate about 24 hours after their deposition on susceptible alfalfa leaves if the proper environmental cues are present, a cool, wet environment. Germ tubes grow towards the surface of epidermal cells and penetrate through the use of an appresorium. Infection of new shoots occurs as they grow through the residue or stubble of previous alfalfa crops as well. The fungus invades inter- and intracellular spaces, and chlorosis of the epidermal cells is seen in as little as 3 days after inoculation. Pycnidia with pycnidiospores are produced after 6 to 8 days, and may erupt through the epidermis of the plant.

About 72 hours after inoculation, germination and penetration of stems occurs. The fungus infects stem tissues directly through stomata or wounds, or through penetration of the host cell wall by a penetration peg produced by a specialized cell known as an appresorium. Once it causes necrosis of the epidermal cells, the fungus moves toward the chlorenchyma and cortical tissues. Lesions appear deep and dark. They enlarge and merge as the fungus moves along and across stem tissues. Conductive vessels, such as the xylem and phloem are last to be infected. Before invasion, hyphae may cover the root and plant surface and penetrate directly or through wounds. Root injuries caused by both biotic and abiotic factors, enhance the disease severity. In a cool, wet spring, whole shoots can be blackened. Spring Black Stem is likely a polycyclic disease in the field. This is determined as the fungus infects new growth if favorable environmental conditions occur, usually in spring and fall, multiple times during the disease cycle. It is a seed and soil-borne pathogen, although survival is limited to up to two years without a host.

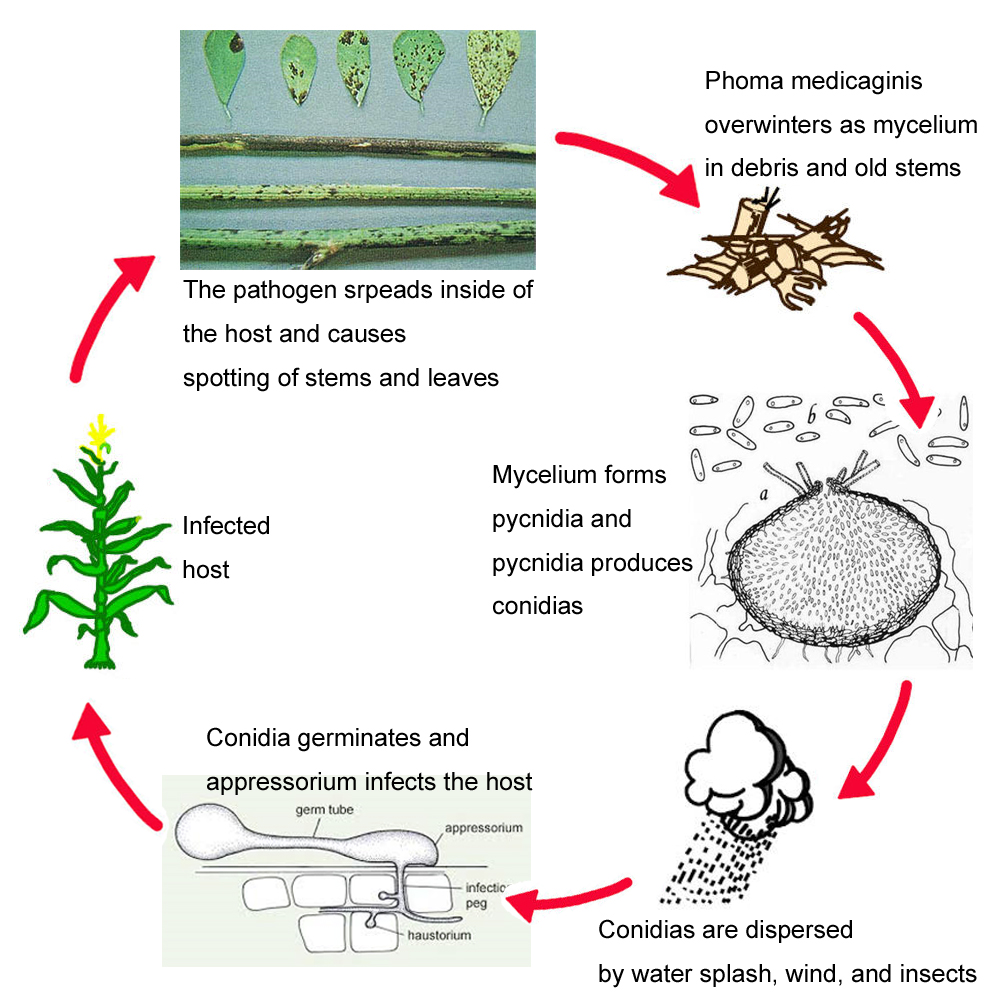
Spring Black Stem Disease Cycle

== Environment ==
Spring black stem mostly occurs during spring season because spring’s cool and moist weather condition is the perfect environment for the infection to spread. Whenever the environment is wet, spores can be splashed onto the leaves, petioles, and stems of the plants. The optimal temperature for the sporulation is 64–75 °F (18–24 °C). During the fall if there are cool, moist periods, the disease can return. This provides future inoculum for the upcoming spring crop and for the last harvest of alfalfa for the season. Prevalence of the disease decreases from higher temperatures and lower moisture in the summer.

== Management ==
There are several management techniques that are being used to control Spring black stem, however, no perfect control exists:

- Cutting alfalfa with spring black stem and leaf spot early; this helps reduce leaf loss, but does not reduce the amount of spores in the field.
- Selecting warm and well-drained soils; this reduces the disease because the pathogen likes cool and wet conditions.
- Slightly acidic or neutral soil (pH level between 6.5 and 7.0): for example, by using soil acidifiers.
- Crop rotation: this can reduce inoculum in the field (ipm). For example, rotating alfalfa every two years with corn, soybeans, or other small grains.
- Sowing only certified seed produced in arid area.
- Targeting weeds and insects to prevent the spread of the disease by these vectors.
- Spring Burning when disease is severe.

== Importance ==
Alfalfa is known as the "Queen of Forages," and is the fourth most widely grown crop in the United States. The estimated value for alfalfa hay is about $8.1 billions. There are 23.6 million acres of alfalfa cut for hay with an average yield of 3.35 tons per acre. Alfalfa meal and cubes are exported to other countries with a value of $49.4 million to the U.S. economy.

Alfalfa is also important due to its high biomass production. It is a widely adapted crop, energy-efficient, and an important source of biological nitrogen fixation. The average acre of alfalfa will fix about 200 kg. of nitrogen per year. This alone reduces the need to apply expensive nitrogen fertilizers. Spring Black Stem is present in numerous alfalfa fields throughout the Northeast United States. In New Jersey alone, it causes a combined loss of about $500,000 worth of alfalfa annually. These losses occur due to stand thinning and loss of quality. In some years, losses can be minimal, while in others they can be detrimental.
