= Broad bean true mosaic virus =

Virus classification
- (unranked): Virus
- Realm: Riboviria
- Kingdom: Orthornavirae
- Phylum: Pisuviricota
- Class: Pisoniviricetes
- Order: Picornavirales
- Family: Secoviridae
- Genus: Comovirus
- Species: Comovirus fabae

Synonyms
- Echtes Ackerbohnemosaik-virus; Vicia virus 1; Viciavirus varians

Species of virus

Broad bean true mosaic virus (also called Echtes Ackerbohnemosaik-virus, Vicia virus 1, and Viciavirus varians) is a virus first described in 1953 that affects legumes, commonly found in crops of broad bean in both Europe and Northwest Africa. There are no known vectors, although it has been known to transverse long distances between crops. Infection via seed is common, though the virus is also present in sap.
