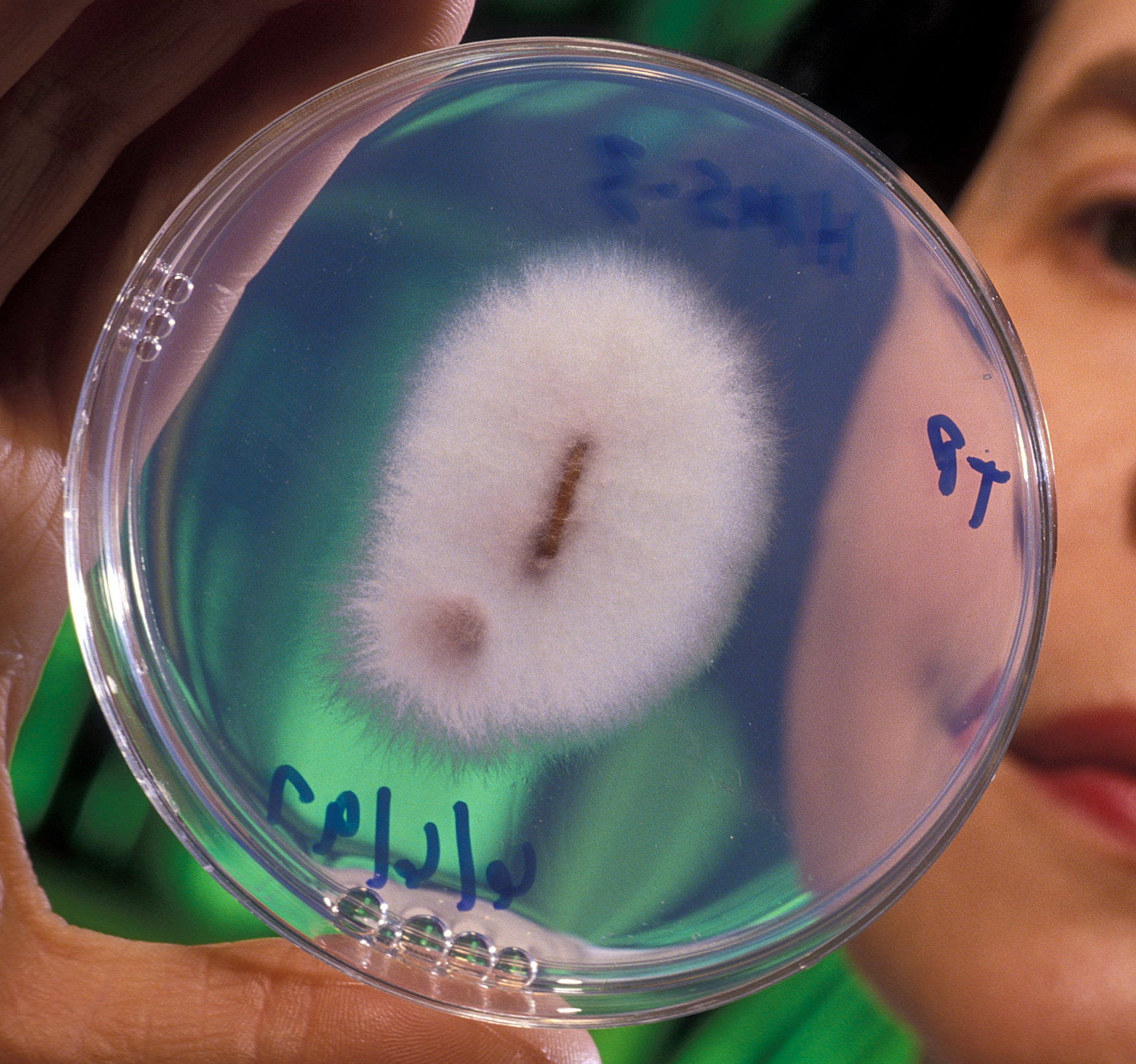
- Plant-pathogenic strain of Fusarium oxysporum that causes fusarium wilt

Scientific classification
- Domain: Eukaryota
- Kingdom: Fungi
- Division: Ascomycota
- Class: Sordariomycetes
- Order: Hypocreales
- Family: Nectriaceae
- Genus: Fusarium
- Species: F. oxysporum
- Forma specialis: F. o. f.sp. ciceris

Trionomial name
- Fusarium oxysporum f.sp. ciceris Matuo & K. Sato [as ciceri], (1962)

Synonyms
- Fusarium lateritium f. ciceris (Padwick) Erwin [as ciceri], (1958); Fusarium merismoides f. ciceris (Padwick) Subram. [as ciceri], (1971); Fusarium orthoceras var. ciceris Padwick [as ciceri], (1940)

= Fusarium oxysporum f.sp. ciceris =

Fungal plant pathogen

Fusarium oxysporum f.sp. ciceris is a fungal plant pathogen that causes fusarium wilt of chickpea.

== Description ==
Fusarium oxysporum is a common soil inhabitant and produces three types of asexual spores: macroconidia, microconidia and chlamydospores.

The macroconidia are straight to slightly curved, slender and thin-walled, usually with three or four septa, a foot-shaped basal cell and a tapered and curved apical cell. They are generally produced from phialides on conidiophores by basipetal division. They are important in secondary infection.

The microconidia are ellipsoidal and have either no septum or a single one. They are formed from phialides in false heads by basipetal division. They are important in secondary infection.

The chlamydospores are globose and have thick walls. They are formed from hyphae or alternatively by the modification of hyphal cells. They are important as endurance organs in soils where they act as inocula in primary infection.

The teleomorph, or sexual reproductive stage, of F. oxysporum is unknown.

== Symptoms ==
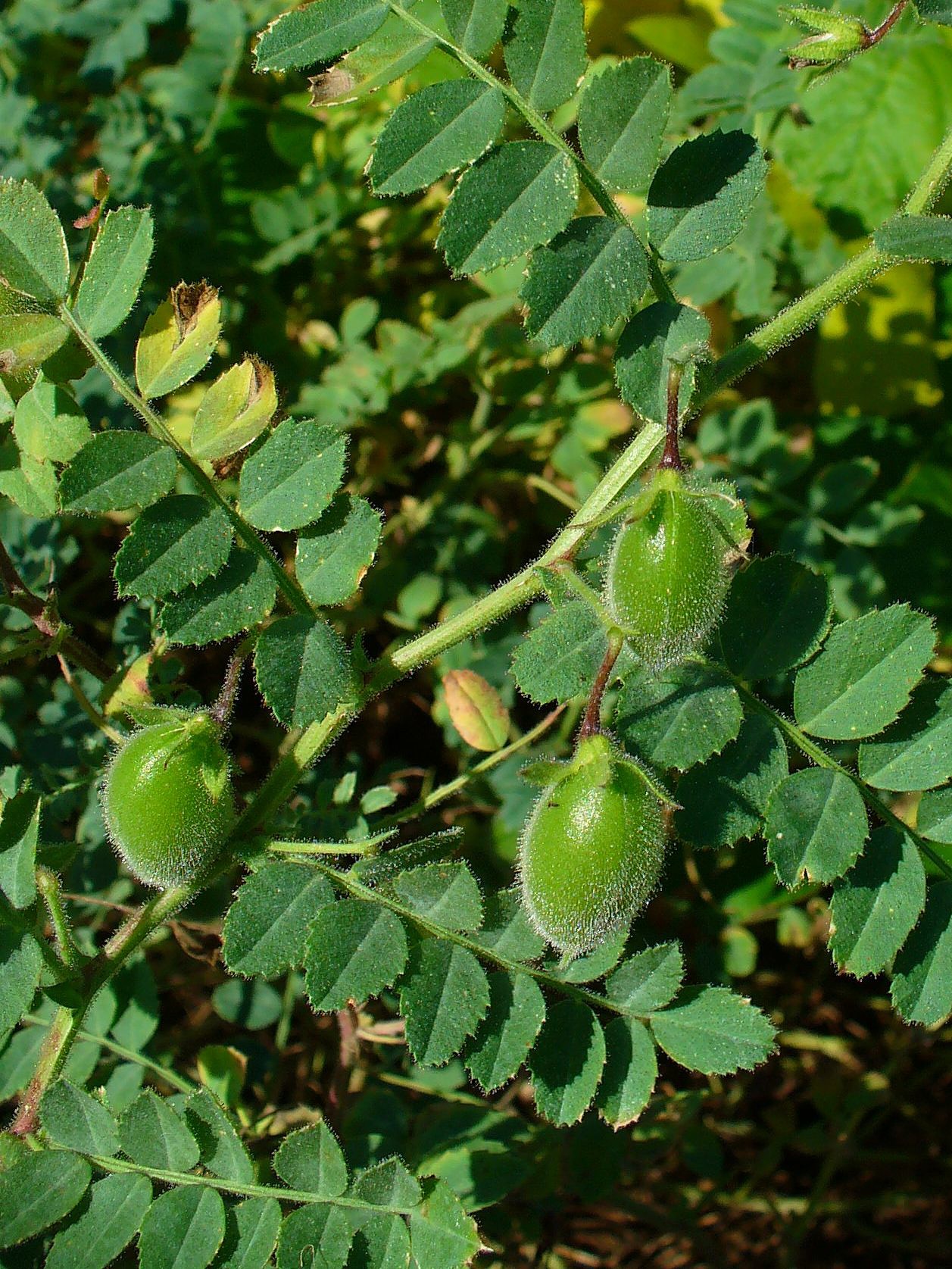
Healthy chickpea plant

The fungus enters the vascular system of the infected plant via the roots. It produces enzymes that degrade the cell walls so that gels are formed that block the plant's transport system. Discolouration of the internal tissues progresses from the roots to the aerial parts of the plant, yellowing and wilting of the foliage occur, and finally there is necrosis.

It is possible to identify affected seedlings approximately three weeks after sowing as they display preliminary symptoms such as drooping and pale-coloured leaves. Later they collapse to a prostrate position and will be found to have shrunken stems both above and below ground level. When adult plants are affected, they exhibit wilting symptoms which progress from the petioles and younger leaves in two or three days to the whole plant. The older leaves develop chlorosis while the younger leaves stay a dull green. At a later stage of the disease, all leaves turn yellow. Discolouration of the pith and xylem occurs in the roots and can be seen when they are cut longitudinally.
