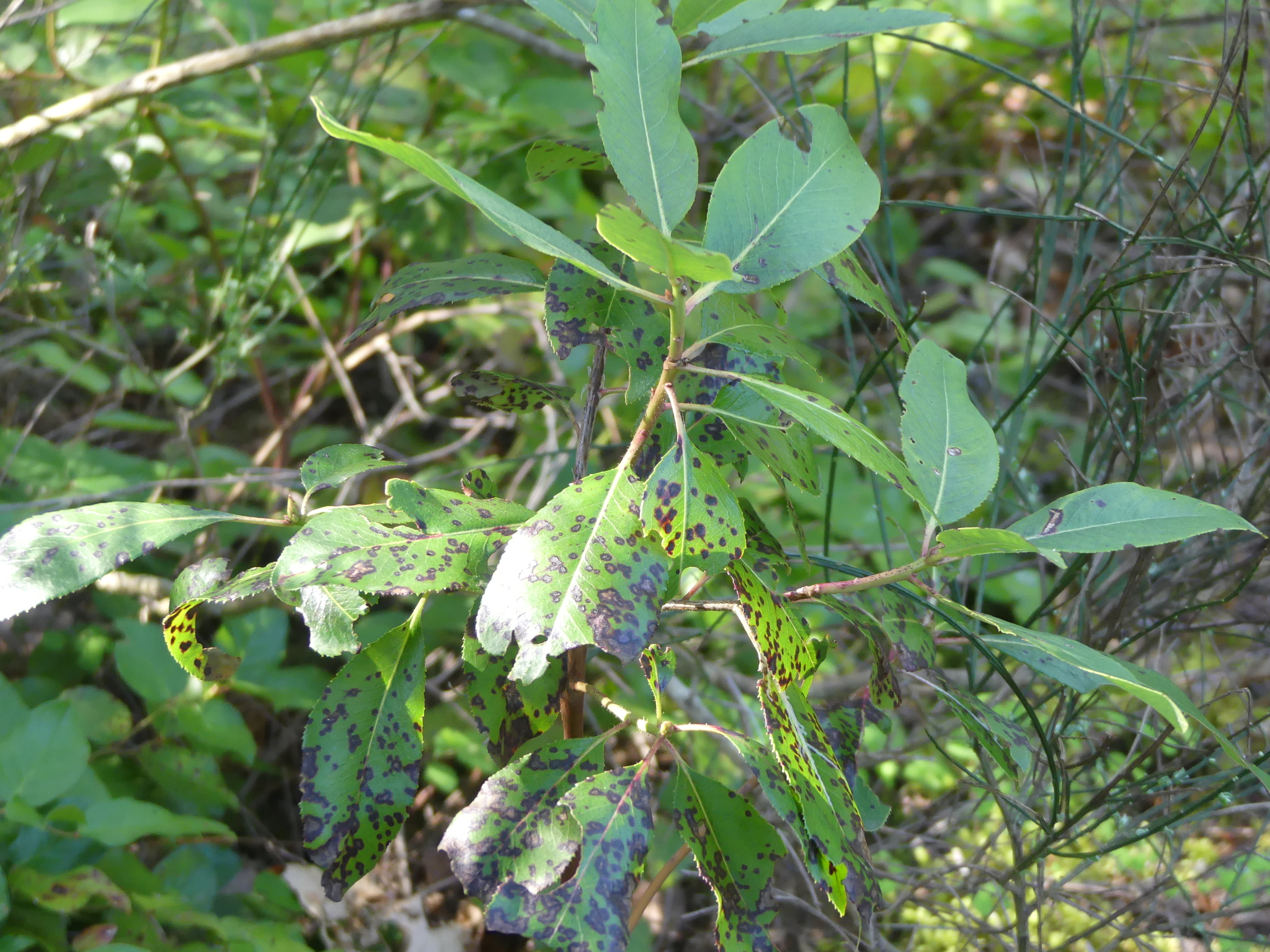

Scientific classification
- Domain: Eukaryota
- Kingdom: Fungi
- Division: Ascomycota
- Class: Leotiomycetes
- Order: Rhytismatales
- Family: Rhytismataceae
- Genus: Phacidiopycnis
- Species: P. washingtonensis

Binomial name
- Phacidiopycnis washingtonensis C.L. Xiao & J.D. Rogers (2005)

= Phacidiopycnis washingtonensis =

Species of fungus

Phacidiopycnis washingtonensis, is a species of fungus in the family Phacidiaceae, first described by C.L. Xiao & J.D. Rogers in 2005. It is a weak orchard pathogen and a cause of rubbery rot, also known as speck rot, in postharvest apples. First described in North Germany, it affects several apple varieties, including commercially important Jonagold and Elstar. Losses caused by P. washingtonensis during storage are usually below 1% but can reach 5–10% of apples.

P. washingtonensis is a weak canker pathogen to apple trees, but while commercial trees in orchards don't seem to be at risk, crabapple pollinators can be susceptible. The fungus causes small black dots (fruiting bodies) to form on infected twigs and tree branches. Fruiting bodies contain millions of spores which serve as the source for fruit infection.

Speck rot in postharvest is characterized by an initial light brown skin discoloration that progresses to a more blackish skin discoloration, with a firm rubbery texture.
