= Fusarium oxysporum f.sp. lentis =

Scientific classification
- Domain: Eukaryota
- Kingdom: Fungi
- Division: Ascomycota
- Class: Sordariomycetes
- Order: Hypocreales
- Family: Nectriaceae
- Genus: Fusarium
- Species: F. oxysporum
- Forma specialis: F. o. f.sp. lentis

Trionomial name
- Fusarium oxysporum f.sp. lentis W.L. Gordon, (1965)

Synonyms
- Fusarium orthoceras var. lentis Vasudeva & Sriniv., (1953)

Fungal plant pathogen

Fusarium oxysporum f.sp. lentis is a fungal plant pathogen infecting lentils.
