= Phacidiopycnis =

Scientific classification
- Kingdom: Fungi
- Division: Ascomycota
- Class: Leotiomycetes
- Order: Rhytismatales
- Family: Rhytismataceae
- Genus: Phacidiopycnis; Potebnia

Type species
- Phacidiopycnis malorum

Genus of fungi

Phacidiopycnis is a genus of fungal plant pathogens in the family Rhytismataceae.

The genus was circumscribed by Andrey Alexandrovich Potebnia in 1911.

== Species ==
According to Catalogue of Life (as of May 2023), the genus has 6 accepted species:

- Phacidiopycnis furfuracea (Fr.) Jørst.
- Phacidiopycnis malorum Potebnia
- Phacidiopycnis melanconioides (Peck) Arx
- Phacidiopycnis padwickii (Khesw.) B. Sutton
- Phacidiopycnis tuberivora (Güssow & W.R. Foster) B. Sutton
- Phacidiopycnis washingtonensis C.L. Xiao & J.D. Rogers
