= National Lentil Festival =

Food festival in Pullman, Washington, U.S.

- Status: active
- Genre: Food
- Date: 1989
- Frequency: Annual
- Location: Pullman, Washington
- Country: United States
- Years active: 28
- Sponsor: USA Dry Pea and Lentil Council
- Website: www.lentilfest.com

The National Lentil Festival is an annual food festival in Pullman, Washington, that honors the lentil.

== Activities ==
The festival takes place every year the weekend before classes resume at Washington State University, also in Pullman. Friday night includes live musical entertainment, a children's carnival, free lentil chili, and many business and craft vendors. Saturday's events include contests, The Lentil Cook-Off, many art and business vendors, a grand parade, breakfast lentil pancake feed, the Tase T. Lentil 5K Fun Run/Walk, beer garden, food court featuring lentil dishes, a large kids area and many other family activities.

=== Cook-off ===
The event includes the 'Legendary Lentil Cook Off'. It is sponsored annually by the USA Dry Pea and Lentil Council, a non-profit organization founded in 1965 for the purpose of promoting and protecting those engaged in growing, processing, warehousing, and merchandising peas, lentils and chickpeas.

== History ==
The original festival was organized in 1989. The objectives of the festival were to promote tourism to the Palouse Region and to promote the locally grown pulses, particularly lentils. At the time of the original festival, the lentil was selected because over 98% of the United States crop of lentils was then grown in the Palouse. The initial festival drew a crowd of approximately 4,000 people. The festival was held annually except in 2020: the COVID-19 pandemic in Washington caused officials to defer the festival to 2021.

Each year The National Lentil Festival is organized with the help of The Pullman Chamber of Commerce and a festival committee, in addition to the many volunteers that help make the event run smoothly.

The Palouse region grows 18% (2017) of all the lentils in the US, according to the festival's website.
