= Chickpea filiform virus =

Chickpea filiform virus (CpFV)

Virus classification
- Group: Group IV ((+)ssRNA)
- Family: Potyviridae
- Genus: Potyvirus
- Species: Chickpea filiform virus

Species of virus

Chickpea filiform virus (CpFV) is a plant pathogenic virus of the family Potyviridae.
