= Broad bean stain virus =

Virus classification
- (unranked): Virus
- Realm: Riboviria
- Kingdom: Orthornavirae
- Phylum: Pisuviricota
- Class: Pisoniviricetes
- Order: Picornavirales
- Family: Secoviridae
- Genus: Comovirus
- Species: Comovirus viciae

Synonyms
- virus de la mosaique de la fSve; MF virus broad bean F1 virus broad bean Evesham stain virus

Species of virus

Broad bean stain virus (BBSV) is a plant pathogenic virus of the family Secoviridae. It infects species in the Fabaceae family of flowering legumes and is not restricted to only broad beans despite its name. The virus is transmitted through seeds and also plant weevils, such as Apion vorax. It is a positive-sense single stranded RNA virus.

Infections were first reported in the UK in 1965, with cases since reported throughout Europe, northern Africa, Australia, and Asia. Infected broad bean plants exhibit mottling and the seeds of infected plants can display a necrotic pattern on the seed coat. Studies by pest management plant biologists have seen success in trials that assessed titanium dioxide nanoparticles as a way of reducing the harmful effects of the virus on broad beans due to its importance as a food crop worldwide.
