= Lettuce necrotic yellows virus =

Virus classification
- (unranked): Virus
- Realm: Riboviria
- Kingdom: Orthornavirae
- Phylum: Negarnaviricota
- Class: Monjiviricetes
- Order: Mononegavirales
- Family: Rhabdoviridae
- Genus: Alphacytorhabdovirus
- Species: Alphacytorhabdovirus lactucanecante

Synonyms
- Lettuce necrotic yellows cytorhabdovirus

Species of virus

Lettuce necrotic yellows virus (LNYV) is a plant virus belonging to the virus order Mononegavirales, family Rhabdoviridae and genus Alphacytorhabdovirus. It was first identified in Australia in the plant species Lactuca sativa in 1963 by Stubbs et al. Since then it has been identified in many other plant species including Datura stramonium and Nicotiana glutinosa. The virus is transmitted by the insect vector Hyperomyzus lactucae. The insect can become infected by feeding on an infected plant. It then acts as a reservoir for the virus in which it can multiply. The virus is also transmitted congenitally to its progeny.
