= Chickpea distortion mosaic virus =

Virus classification
- Group: Group IV ((+)ssRNA)
- Order: Unassigned
- Family: Potyviridae
- Genus: Potyvirus
- Species: Chickpea distortion mosaic virus

Species of virus

Chickpea distortion mosaic virus is a plant pathogenic virus of the family Potyviridae.
