= Phacidiopycnis padwickii =

Scientific classification
- Kingdom: Fungi
- Division: Ascomycota
- Class: Leotiomycetes
- Order: Rhytismatales
- Family: Rhytismataceae
- Genus: Phacidiopycnis
- Species: P. padwickii

Binomial name
- Phacidiopycnis padwickii (Khesw.) B. Sutton, (1980)

Synonyms
- Operculella padwickii Khesw., (1941)

Species of fungus

Phacidiopycnis padwickii is a species of fungus in the family Phacidiaceae, first described by Kavasji Framaji Kheswalla in 1941. It is a plant pathogen that causes collar rot, foot rot, wilt and blight of chickpea.
