= Ozonium texanum var. parasiticum =

Scientific classification
- Kingdom: Fungi
- Division: Ascomycota
- Class: Ascomycetes
- Order: incertae sedis
- Family: incertae sedis
- Genus: Ozonium
- Species: O. texanum
- Variety: O. t. var. parasiticum

Trinomial name
- Ozonium texanum var. parasiticum Thirum. (1951)

Variety of fungus

Ozonium texanum var. parasiticum is an ascomycete fungus that is a plant pathogen of chickpeas and lentils.

== See also ==
- List of lentil diseases
- List of chickpea diseases
