= Heterodera ciceri =

Scientific classification
- Domain: Eukaryota
- Kingdom: Animalia
- Phylum: Nematoda
- Class: Secernentea
- Order: Tylenchida
- Family: Heteroderidae
- Genus: Heterodera
- Species: H. ciceri

Binomial name
- Heterodera ciceri Vovlas, Greco & Di Vito, 1985

Species of roundworm

Heterodera ciceri is a plant pathogenic nematode infecting lentils and chickpeas.

== See also ==
- List of lentil diseases
- List of chickpea diseases
