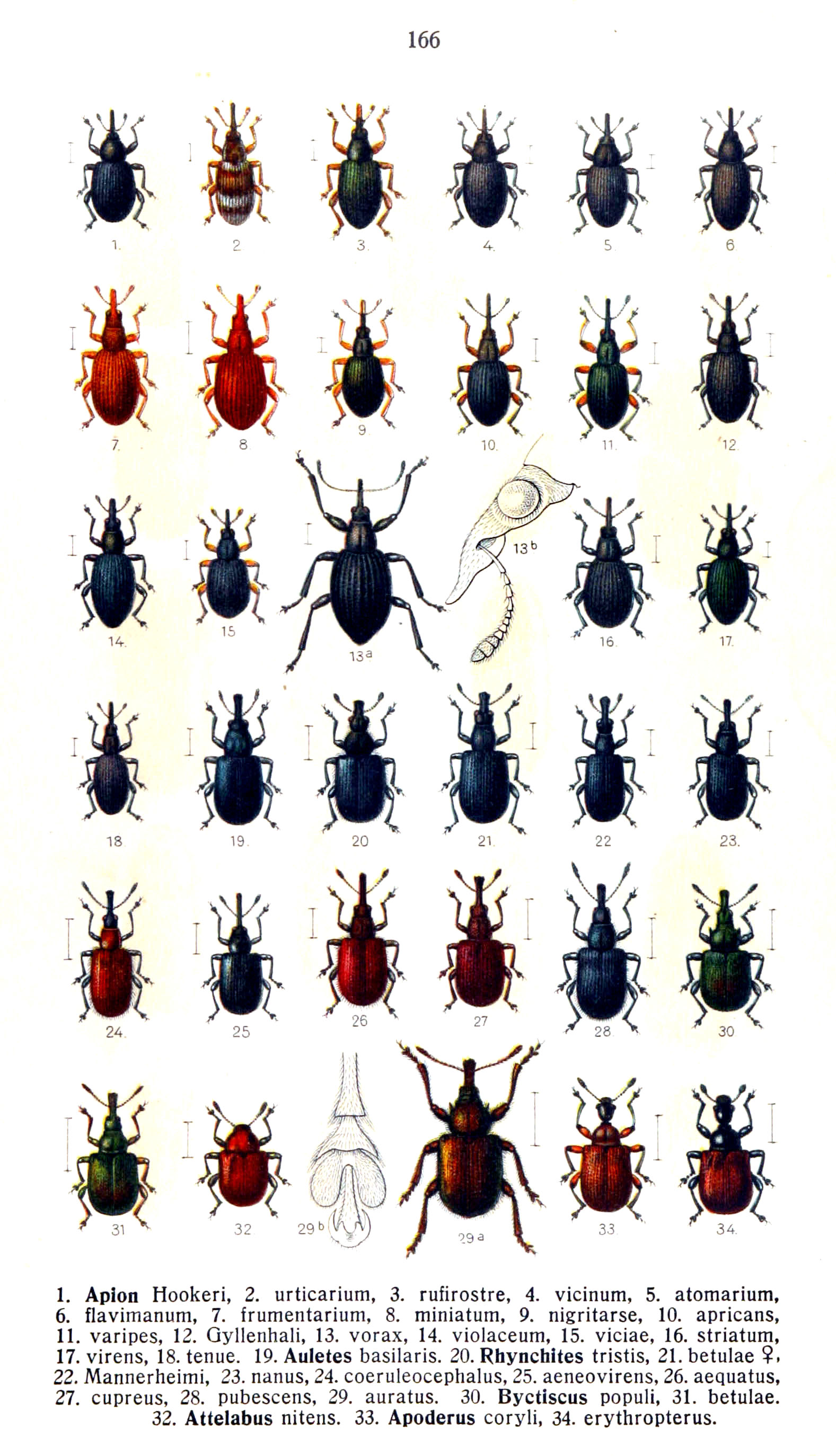

Scientific classification
- Kingdom: Animalia
- Phylum: Arthropoda
- Class: Insecta
- Order: Coleoptera
- Suborder: Polyphaga
- Infraorder: Cucujiformia
- Family: Brentidae
- Genus: Apion
- Species: A. vorax

Binomial name
- Apion vorax Herbst, 1797

= Apion vorax =

Species of beetle

Apion vorax is a species of seed weevils native to Europe.
