= Leveillula papilionacearum =

Scientific classification
- Kingdom: Fungi
- Division: Ascomycota
- Class: Leotiomycetes
- Order: Helotiales
- Family: Erysiphaceae
- Genus: Phyllactinia
- Species: L. papilionacearum

Binomial name
- Leveillula papilionacearum (Kom.) U. Braun, 2012

Synonyms
- Erysiphe papilionacearum Kom., 1895

Fungal plant pathogen

Leveillula papilionacearum is a species of powdery mildew, fungal plant pathogens in the family Erysiphaceae.
