= Ascochyta medicaginicola =

Scientific classification
- Domain: Eukaryota
- Kingdom: Fungi
- Division: Ascomycota
- Class: Dothideomycetes
- Order: Pleosporales
- Family: Didymellaceae
- Genus: Ascochyta
- Species: A. medicaginicola

Binomial name
- Ascochyta medicaginicola Q. Chen & L. Cai

Synonyms
- Phoma medicaginis Malbr. & Roum., (1886)

Species of fungus

Ascochyta medicaginicola (syn. Phoma medicaginis) is a plant pathogen infecting alfalfa and Medicago truncatula. One particular disease is spring black stem.

== See also ==
- List of Ascochyta species
