= Forma specialis =

Informal taxonomic group

The hierarchy of biological classification's eight major taxonomic ranks. Intermediate minor rankings are not shown.

Forma specialis (plural: formae speciales), abbreviated f. sp. (plural ff. spp.) without italics, is an informal taxonomic grouping allowed by the International Code of Nomenclature for algae, fungi, and plants, that is applied to a parasite (most frequently a fungus) which is adapted to a specific host. This classification may be applied by authors who do not feel that a subspecies or variety name is appropriate, and it is therefore not necessary to specify morphological differences that distinguish this form. The literal meaning of the term is 'special form', but this grouping does not correspond to the more formal botanical use of the taxonomic rank of forma or form.

An example is Puccinia graminis f. sp. avenae, which affects oats.

An alternative term in contexts not related to biological nomenclature is physiological race (sometimes also given as biological race, and in that context treated as synonymous with biological form), except in that the name of a race is added after the binomial scientific name (and may be arbitrary, e.g. an alphanumeric code, usually with the word "race"), e.g. "Podosphaera xanthii race S". A forma specialis is used as part of the infraspecific scientific name (and follows Latin-based scientific naming conventions), inserted after the interpolation "f. sp.", as in the "Puccinia graminis f. sp. avenae" example.

== History, and use with "pathotype" ==
The forma specialis category was introduced and recommended in the International Code of Botanical Nomenclature of 1930, but was not widely adopted. Fungal pathogens within Alternaria alternata species have also been called pathotypes (not to be confused with pathotype as used in bacteriology) by author Syoyo Nishimura who stated:

"[E]ach pathogen should be called a distinct pathotype of A. alternata"

Some authors have subsequently used forma specialis and "pathotype" together for the species A. alternata:

"Currently there are seven pathotypes of A. alternata described ..., but this term is not widely adopted. ... To further standardise the taxonomic terms used, the trinomial system introduced by Rotem (1994) is favoured. When differences in host affinity are observed within the isolates of one ... species, the third epithet, the forma specialis, defines the affinity to this specific host in accordance with the produced toxin causing this affinity. When different toxins are produced on the same host, but these toxins affect different host species, the term pathotype should be used in addition. All isolates which are not confined to specific hosts and / or toxins should retain only the binomial name until such specificity is found."

== See also ==
- Form (zoology)
- Forma (botany)
- Pathovar, used in bacteriology
- Phytopathology
- Race (taxonomy)
