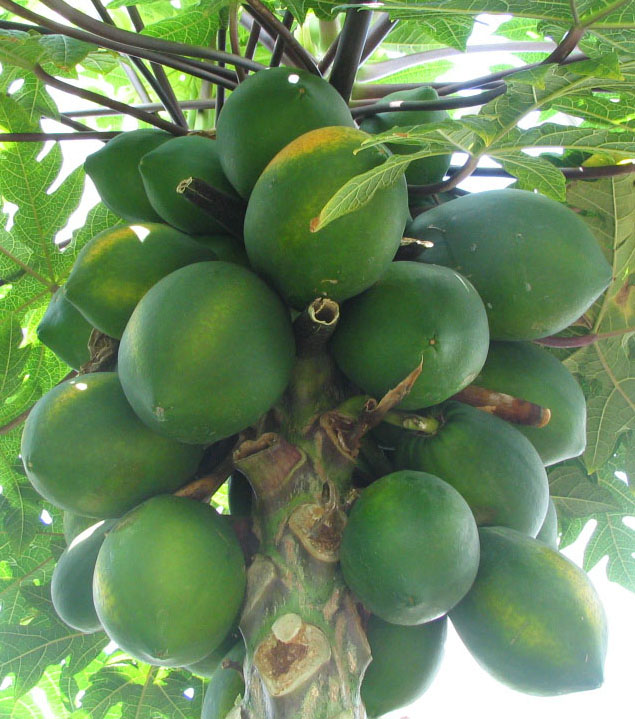

Scientific classification
- Kingdom: Plantae
- Clade: Tracheophytes
- Clade: Angiosperms
- Clade: Eudicots
- Clade: Rosids
- Order: Brassicales
- Family: Caricaceae
- Genus: Carica; L.

= Carica =

Genus of flowering plants

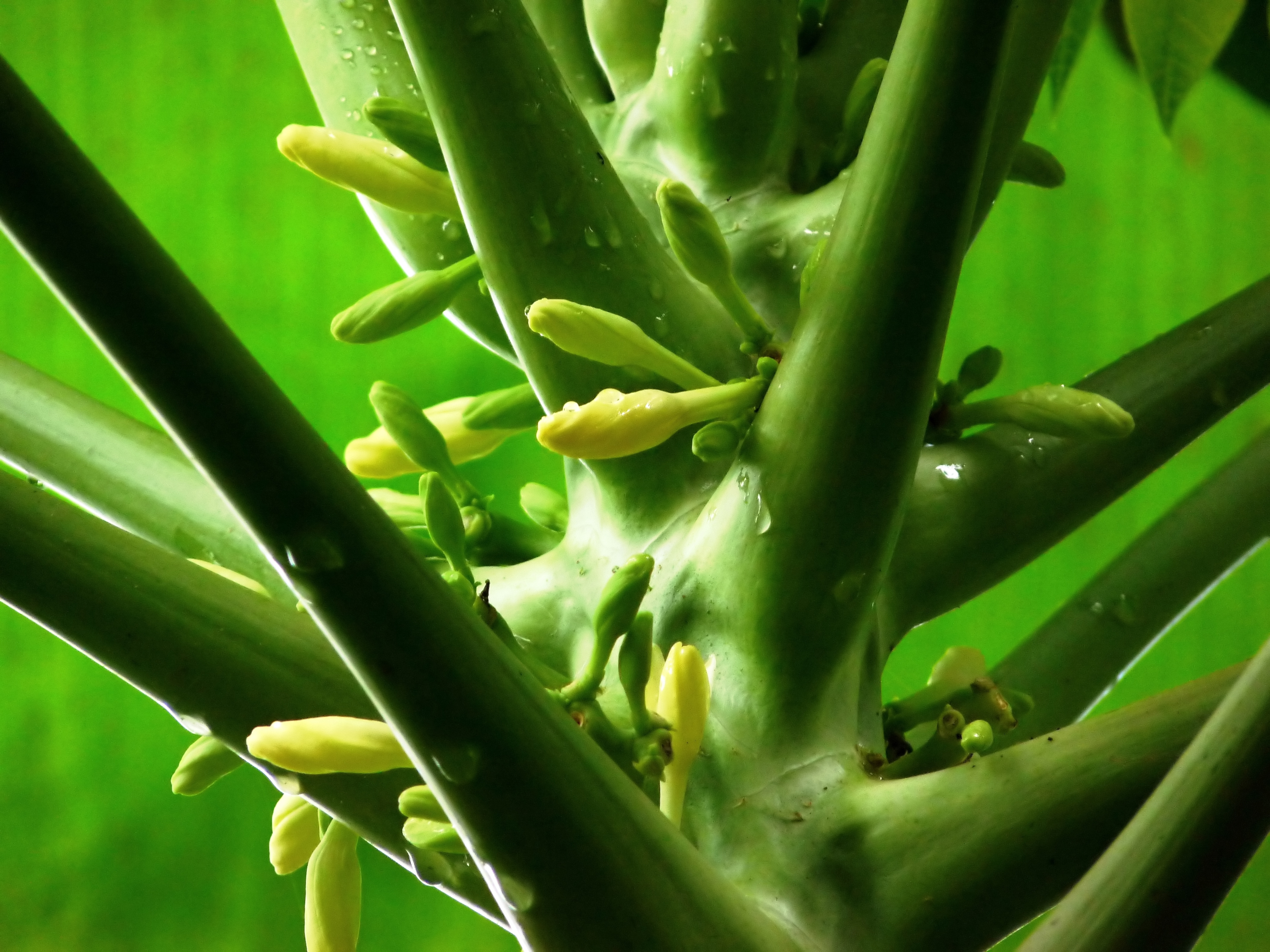
Buds

Carica is a genus of flowering plants in the family Caricaceae including the papaya (C. papaya syn. C. peltata, C. posoposa), a widely cultivated fruit tree native to the American tropics.

The genus was formerly treated as including about 20-25 species of short-lived evergreen pachycaul shrubs or small trees growing to 5–10 m tall, native to tropical Central and South America, but recent genetic evidence has resulted in all of these species other than C. papaya being reclassified into three other genera.

== Taxonomy ==
The genus name comes from the botanical name of the fig, Ficus carica, because of the species' leaves or fruits resemble that of it. The carica epithet comes from Caria in southwest Anatolia (Asia Minor), Turkey, where the fig was mistakenly thought to have come from.

== Species ==
According to World Flora Online, the genus Carica lists 21 species. Most of the other species have since been transferred to the genus Vasconcellea, with a few to the genera Jacaratia and Jarilla. According to the Catalogue of Life, the three remaining species in the genus are:

- Carica aprica V. M. Badillo
- Carica augusti Harms
- Carica papaya L. (Papaya)

The species that have since been transferred to their new genera are as follows:

- Carica baccata = Vasconcellea microcarpa subsp. baccata
- Carica candamarcensis = Vasconcellea cundinamarcensis (Mountain papaya)
- Carica candicans = Vasconcellea candicans (Mito)
- Carica caudata = Jarilla heterophylla
- Carica cauliflora = Vasconcellea cauliflora
- Carica cestriflora = Vasconcellea cundinamarcensis
- Carica chilensis = Vasconcellea chilensis
- Carica cnidoscoloides = Horovitzia cnidoscoloides Lorence & R. Torres
- Carica crassipetala = Vasconcellea crassipetala
- Carica cundinamarcensis = Vasconcellea cundinamarcensis
- Carica dodecaphylla = Jacaratia spinosa
- Carica glandulosa = Vasconcellea glandulosa
- Carica goudotiana = Vasconcellea goudotiana
- Carica heterophylla = Vasconcellea microcarpa subsp. heterophylla
- Carica horovitziana = Vasconcellea horovitziana
- Carica longiflora = Vasconcellea longiflora
- Carica mexicana = Jacaratia mexicana
- Carica microcarpa = Vasconcellea microcarpa
- Carica monoica = Vasconcellea monoica
- Carica nana = Jarilla nana
- Carica omnilingua = Vasconcellea omnilingua
- Carica palandensis = Vasconcellea palandensis
- Carica parviflora = Vasconcellea parviflora
- Carica pentagona = Vasconcellea × heilbornii (Babaco)
- Carica pubescens = Vasconcellea pubescens (Mountain papaya or Chilean Carica)
- Carica pulchra = Vasconcellea pulchra
- Carica quercifolia = Vasconcellea quercifolia
- Carica sphaerocarpa = Vasconcellea sphaerocarpa
- Carica spinosa = Jacaratia spinosa
- Carica sprucei = Vasconcellea sprucei
- Carica stipulata = Vasconcellea stipulata
- Carica weberbaueri = Vasconcellea weberbaueri
