= Papayuelo =

Papayuelo refers to one of a few related trees (or their fruit) in the papaya family:

1. Mountain papaya (Vasconcellea pubescens)
2. Vasconcellea goudotiana
