= Vasconcellea stipulata =

Scientific classification
- Kingdom: Plantae
- Clade: Tracheophytes
- Clade: Angiosperms
- Clade: Eudicots
- Clade: Rosids
- Order: Brassicales
- Family: Caricaceae
- Genus: Vasconcellea
- Species: V. stipulata

Binomial name
- Vasconcellea stipulata (V.M.Badillo)

Synonyms
- Carica stipulata V.M.Badillo

Species of flowering plant

Vasconcellea stipulata, known also as toronche or jigacho, is a fruit-bearing species in the Vasconcellea genus, Caricaceae family. It is native to Ecuador and Peru.

Babaco is a natural hybrid of V. stipulata and V. pubescens, although it has been suggested that other species may be involved.

== Uses ==
It is the least commercially exploited species among those of economic importance in Ecuador. Its use is limited to domestic and small-scale cultivation, and its food uses are mainly confections and preserves.
