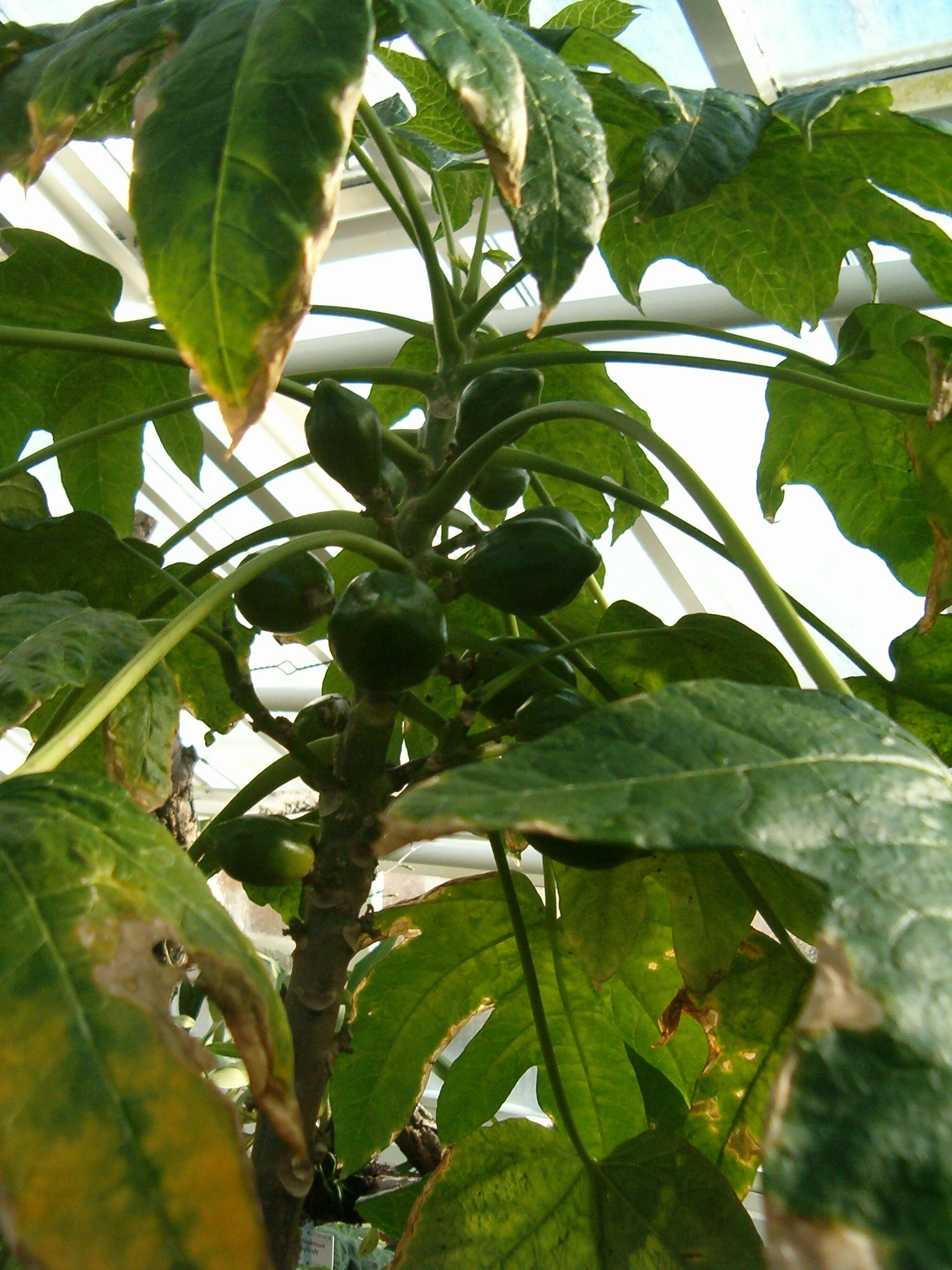

Scientific classification
- Kingdom: Plantae
- Clade: Tracheophytes
- Clade: Angiosperms
- Clade: Eudicots
- Clade: Rosids
- Order: Brassicales
- Family: Caricaceae
- Genus: Vasconcellea
- Species: V. monoica

Binomial name
- Vasconcellea monoica (Desf.) A. DC.

Synonyms
- Carica monoica

= Vasconcellea monoica =

Species of flowering plant

Vasconcellea monoica (commonly known as col de montaña, col de monte, or peladera in Spanish) is a species of flowering plant in the family Caricaceae. It is native to Bolivia, Ecuador, and Peru. The plant has a chromosome count of 2n = 18.

It was previously placed in genus Carica.

== Gallery ==
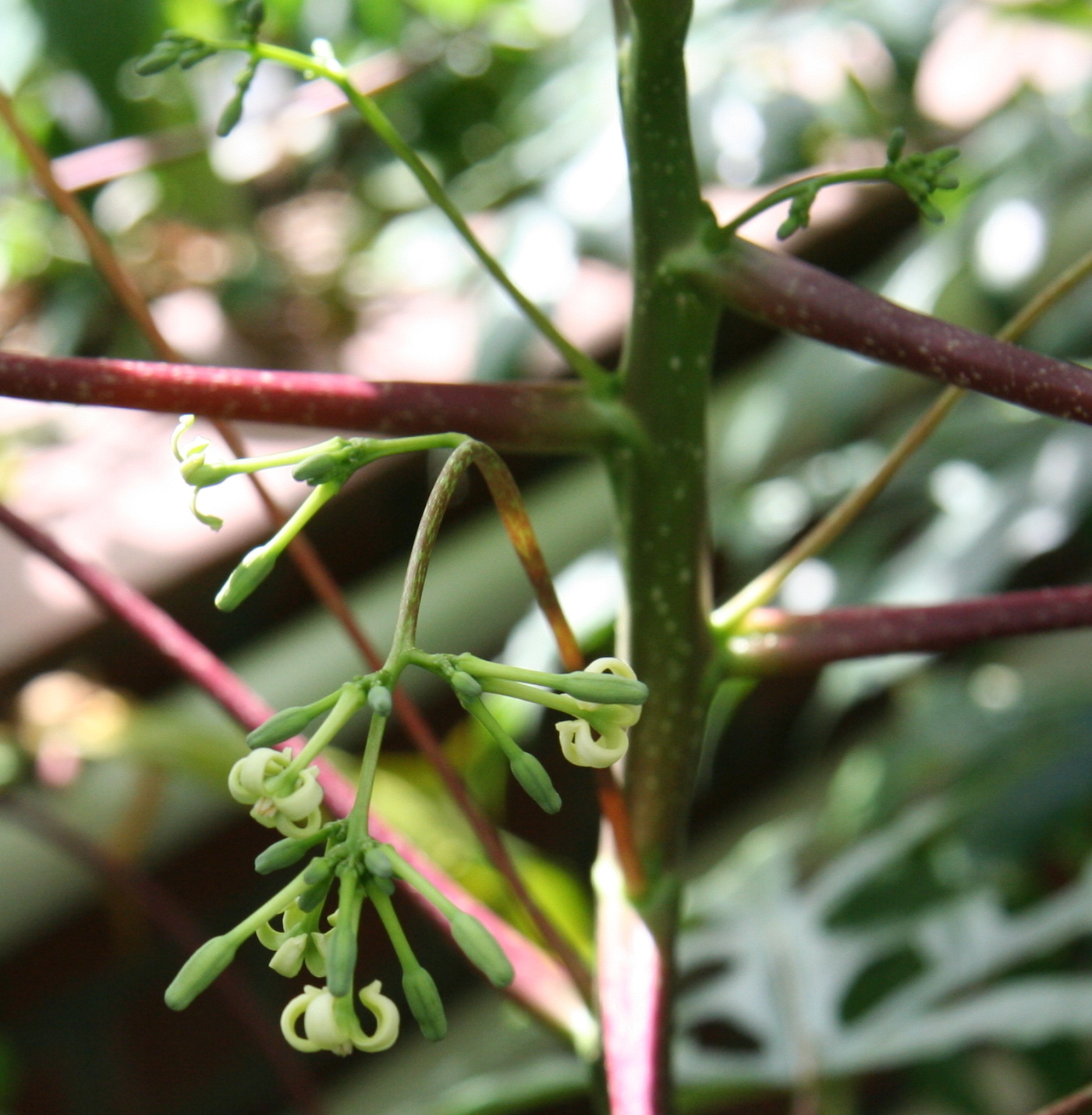
Flowers of V. monoica

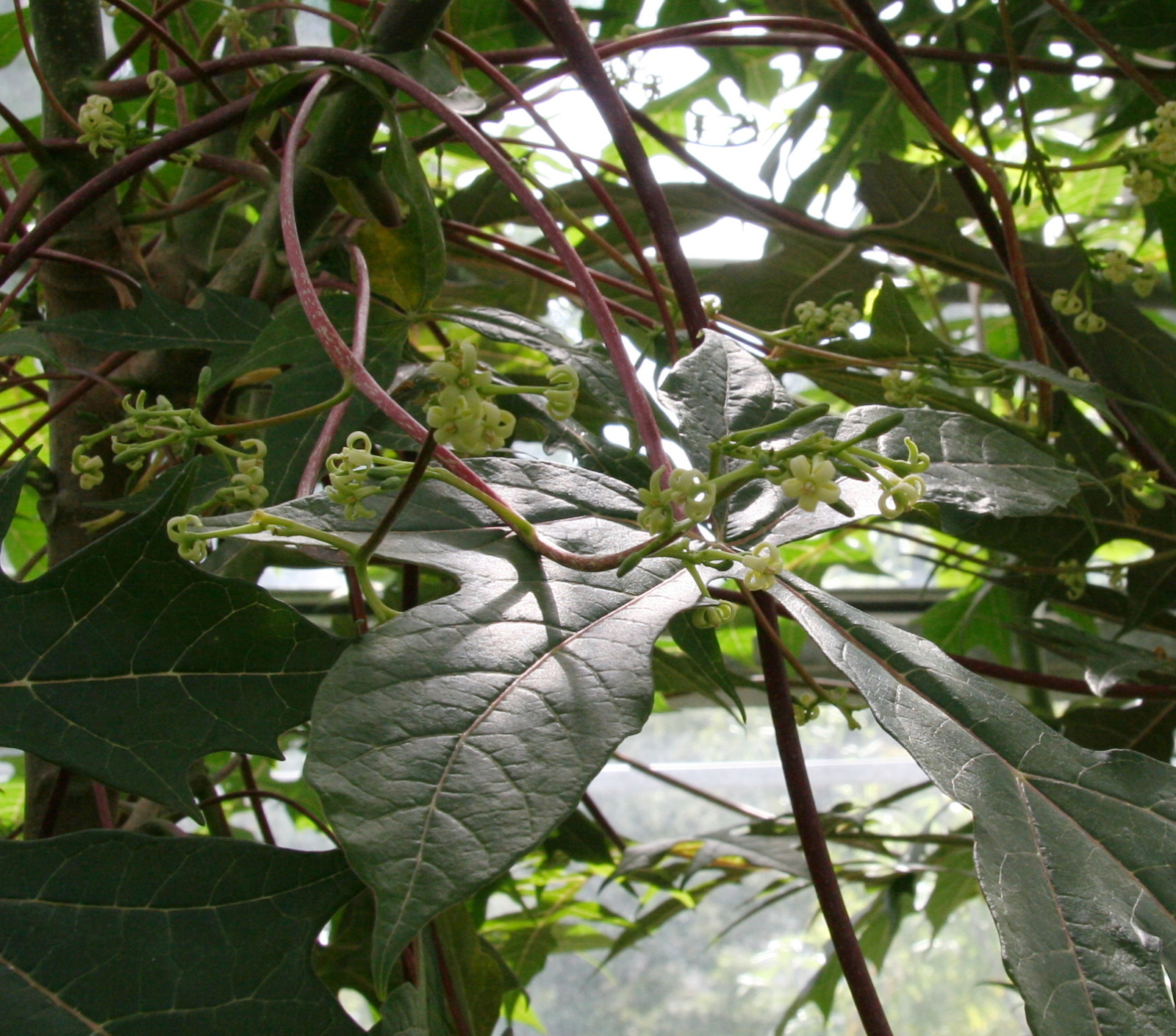
Flowers of V. monoica

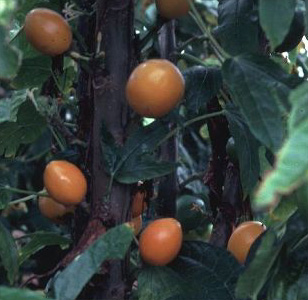
Ripe fruit of V. monoica
