= Vasconcellea omnilingua =

Conservation status
- Endangered (IUCN 3.1)

Scientific classification
- Kingdom: Plantae
- Clade: Tracheophytes
- Clade: Angiosperms
- Clade: Eudicots
- Clade: Rosids
- Order: Brassicales
- Family: Caricaceae
- Genus: Vasconcellea
- Species: V. omnilingua

Binomial name
- Vasconcellea omnilingua (V.M. Badillo) V.M. Badillo

Species of flowering plant

Vasconcellea omnilingua is a species of plant in the family Caricaceae. It is endemic to Ecuador. Its natural habitat is subtropical or tropical moist montane forest. It is threatened by habitat loss.

It was previously placed in genus Carica.
