= Vasconcellea palandensis =

Conservation status
- Vulnerable (IUCN 3.1)

Scientific classification
- Kingdom: Plantae
- Clade: Tracheophytes
- Clade: Angiosperms
- Clade: Eudicots
- Clade: Rosids
- Order: Brassicales
- Family: Caricaceae
- Genus: Vasconcellea
- Species: V. palandensis

Binomial name
- Vasconcellea palandensis (V.M. Badillo, Van den Eynden & Van Damme) V.M. Badillo

Species of flowering plant

Vasconcellea palandensis is a species of plant in the family Caricaceae. It is endemic to Ecuador. Its natural habitat is subtropical or tropical moist montane forest. It is threatened by habitat loss.

It was previously placed in genus Carica.
