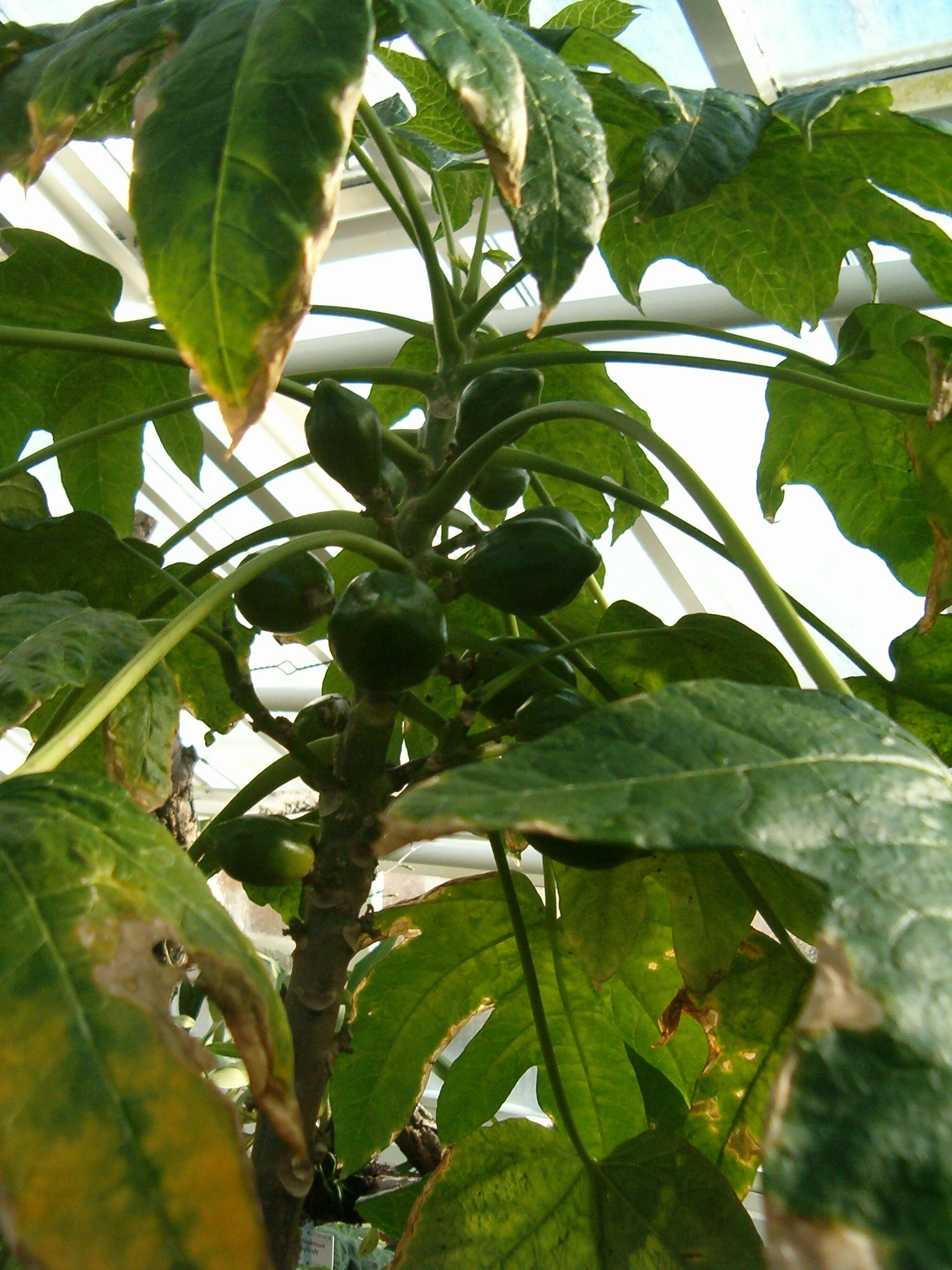
- Vasconcellea monoica with immature fruit

Scientific classification
- Kingdom: Plantae
- Clade: Tracheophytes
- Clade: Angiosperms
- Clade: Eudicots
- Clade: Rosids
- Order: Brassicales
- Family: Caricaceae
- Genus: Vasconcellea; A.St.-Hil.

Species
- See text

= Vasconcellea =

Genus of fruits and plants

Vasconcellea is a genus with 26 species of flowering plants in the family Caricaceae. Most were formerly treated in the genus Carica, but have been split out on genetic evidence. The genus name has also been incorrectly spelled "Vasconcella".

They are evergreen pachycaul shrubs or small trees growing to 5 m tall, native to tropical South America. Many have edible fruit similar to the closely related papaya, and some are widely cultivated in South America.

Species

- Vasconcellea badilloi
- Vasconcellea candicans
- Vasconcellea carvalhoae
- Vasconcellea cauliflora
- Vasconcellea chachapoyensis
- Vasconcellea chilensis
- Vasconcellea crassipetala
- Vasconcellea glandulosa
- Vasconcellea goudotiana
- Vasconcellea heilbornii
- Vasconcellea horovitziana
- Vasconcellea joseromeroi
- Vasconcellea jossei
- Vasconcellea lanceolata
- Vasconcellea longiflora
- Vasconcellea microcarpa
- Vasconcellea monoica
- Vasconcellea omnilingua
- Vasconcellea palandensis
- Vasconcellea parviflora
- Vasconcellea pentalobis
- Vasconcellea peruviensis
- Vasconcellea pubescens (Syn. Vasconcellea cundinamarcensis) (mountain papaya)
- Vasconcellea pulchra
- Vasconcellea quercifolia
- Vasconcellea sphaerocarpa
- Vasconcellea sprucei
- Vasconcellea stipulata
- Vasconcellea weberbaueri

Hybrids

- Vasconcellea × heilbornii (babaco)
