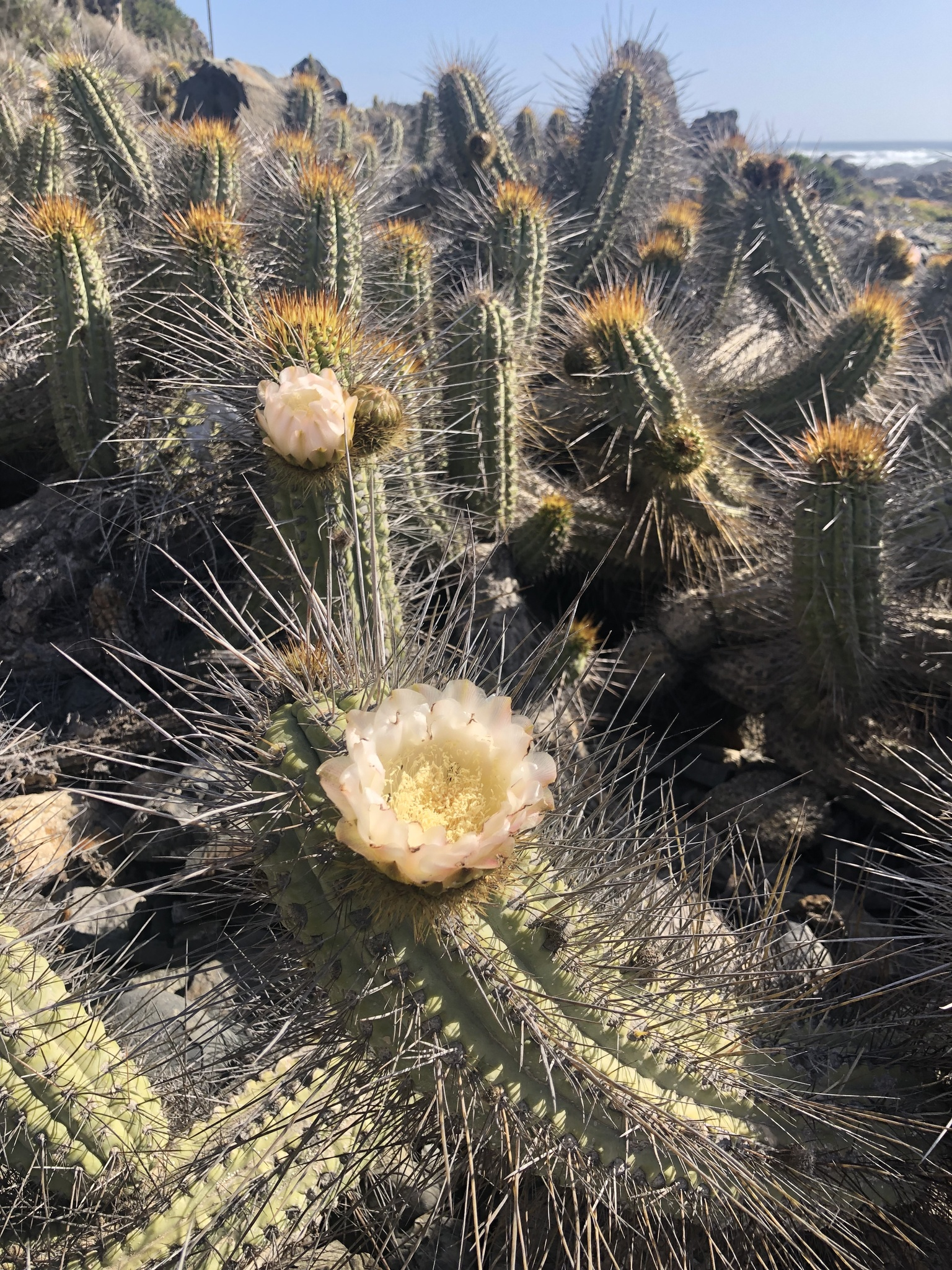

Conservation status
- Least Concern (IUCN 3.1)

Scientific classification
- Kingdom: Plantae
- Clade: Embryophytes
- Clade: Tracheophytes
- Clade: Spermatophytes
- Clade: Angiosperms
- Clade: Eudicots
- Order: Caryophyllales
- Family: Cactaceae
- Subfamily: Cactoideae
- Genus: Eulychnia
- Species: E. castanea

Binomial name
- Eulychnia castanea Phil. 1864

Synonyms
- Cereus castaneus (Phil.) K.Schum. 1903; Philippicereus castaneus (Phil.) Backeb. 1942

= Eulychnia castanea =

Species of cactus

Eulychnia castanea is a species of Eulychnia found in Chile.

== Description ==
This cactus has a grass-green epidermis and creeps from the base, forming thickets several meters in diameter, though the plants themselves are relatively short, around 50 cm in height. The stems are typically 1 to 2 meters long, lying prostrate at the base, and are 6 to 8 cm thick. Each stem usually bears 9 to 12 ribs, occasionally 8 or 13, which are over 1 cm wide and about 1 cm high with blunt, deeply notched edges. Winged grooves descend from these notches towards the furrows between the ribs. Rounded areoles, about 5 mm in diameter, extend from the tubercles to the notches and are covered in dark gray or blackish-gray felt, spaced about 1 cm apart.

The spines vary from brown to yellowish-brown, sometimes with lighter or darker banding, and are straight. There are 6 to 10 radial spines, 0.5 to 2 cm long, which are needle-like when shorter and awl-shaped when longer, oriented laterally. Additionally, one to two robust central spines, 3 to 10 cm long, are awl-shaped and overlap, often accompanied by smaller central spines.

Flowers emerge laterally on the stems, measuring 5 to 5.5 cm long with a 4 to 5 cm opening. They emit a faint fragrance, opening fully at midday and partially closing at night. The white petals are about 2.5 cm long and 1.2 cm wide, spatulate in shape with rounded ends, forming a bowl-like structure where lower petals are less extended than upper ones. The grass-green ovary is circular to ovoid, about 2 cm long and 2.5 cm thick at the top, with a finely tuberculate surface covered in narrow green scales tipped with short, dry, black bristles, small tufts of brown felt, and developing yellowish-brown spines. The ovary wall is thick, with a light-refracting green outer layer and a white, matte inner layer. A saucer-shaped nectary receptacle, 2–3 mm high and 7–10 mm wide, is narrowed by the thick base of the style into a honey-yellow ring. The broadly funnel-shaped floral tube is about 13 mm long and reaches 2.5 cm in width at the top. White stamens are arranged in two groups: lower ones, numerous and inclined inwards, are inserted about 5 mm above the nectary and measure about 13 mm; upper ones form a ring at the floral tube's edge, inclined towards the petals, and are slightly shorter. Cream-colored anthers and a white style, about 4 mm thick and 2 cm long, are present, with 14–16 spreading, yellowish stigmatic lobes that slightly exceed the anthers.

The fruit is yellowish-green, about 5 cm long and 4 cm thick at the top, tapering towards the base. It retains a covering similar to the ovary, with straight, needle-like, sharp spines up to 1 to 3 cm long. The non-withering outer wall of the floral tube is characteristic of the genus. The pulp is white, juicy, mucilaginous, fragrant, and has a sour but pleasant taste. The fruit does not open upon ripening, and the spiny areoles remain attached. Seeds are approximately 1.5 mm long, 1.0 mm wide, and 0.4 mm thick, with a convex dorsal shape, lacking a keel, a pointed base, and a black, matte testa with very fine tubercles. The hilum is small, ventral, oval-shaped, and white.

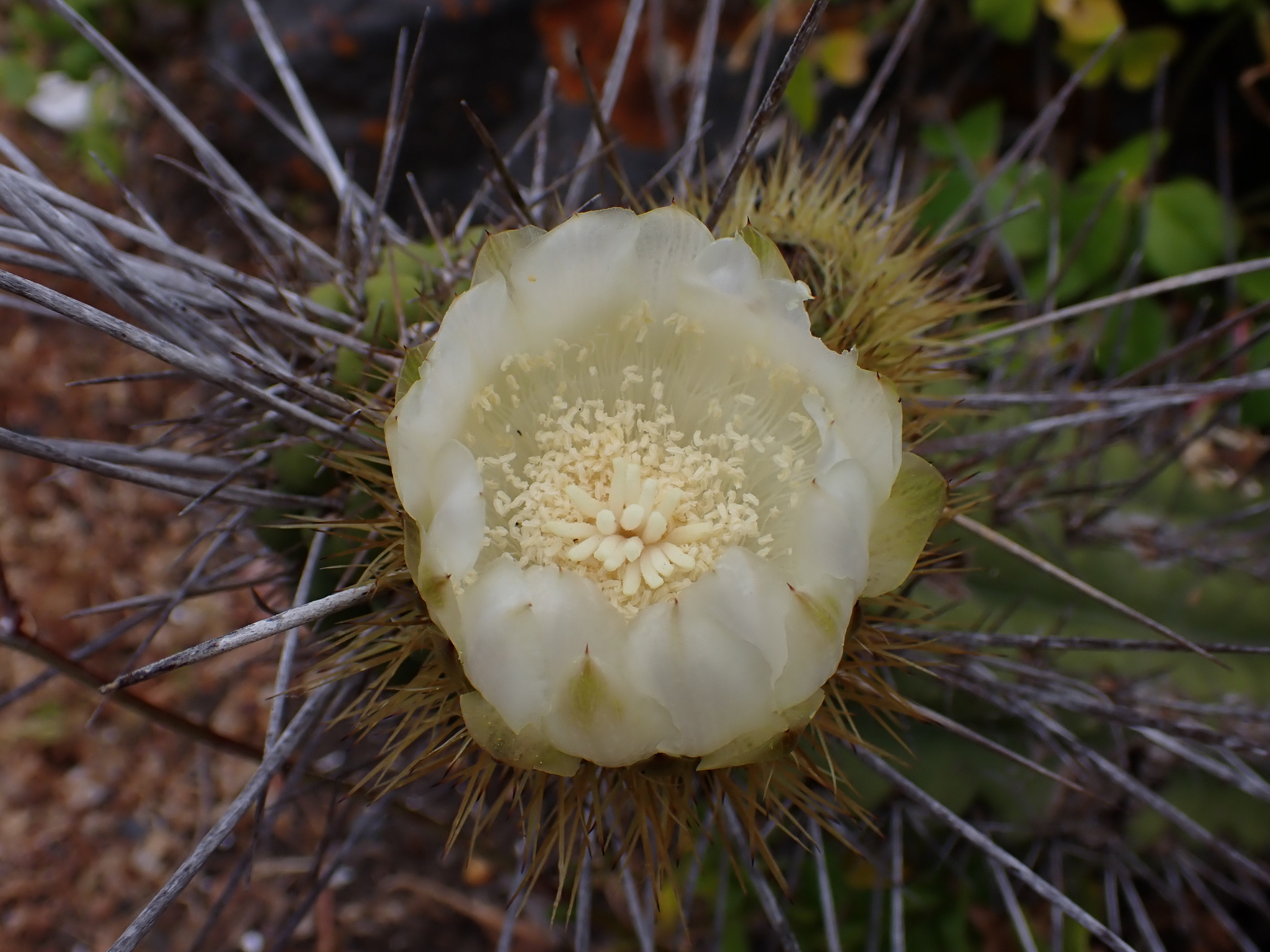
Flower

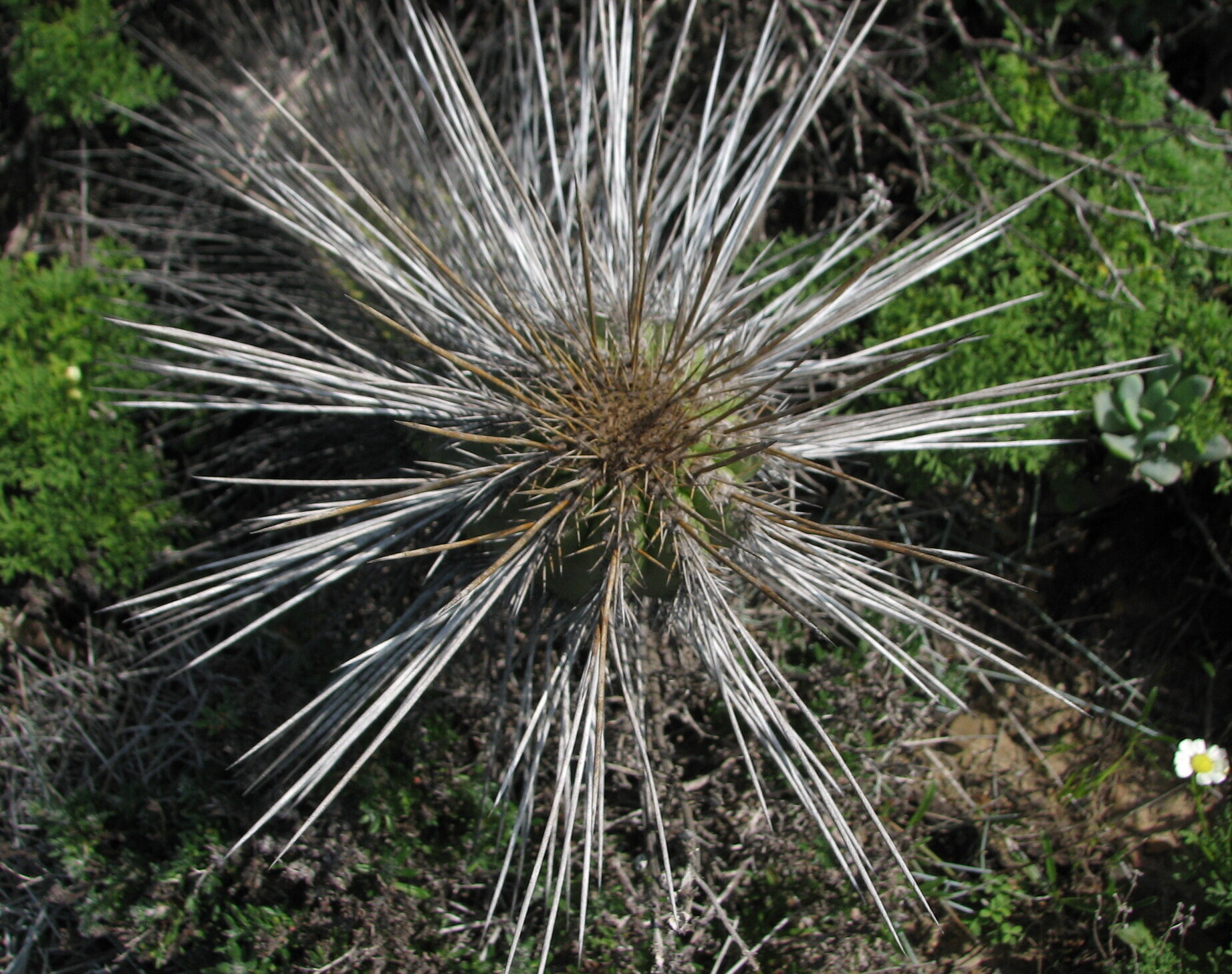
spines

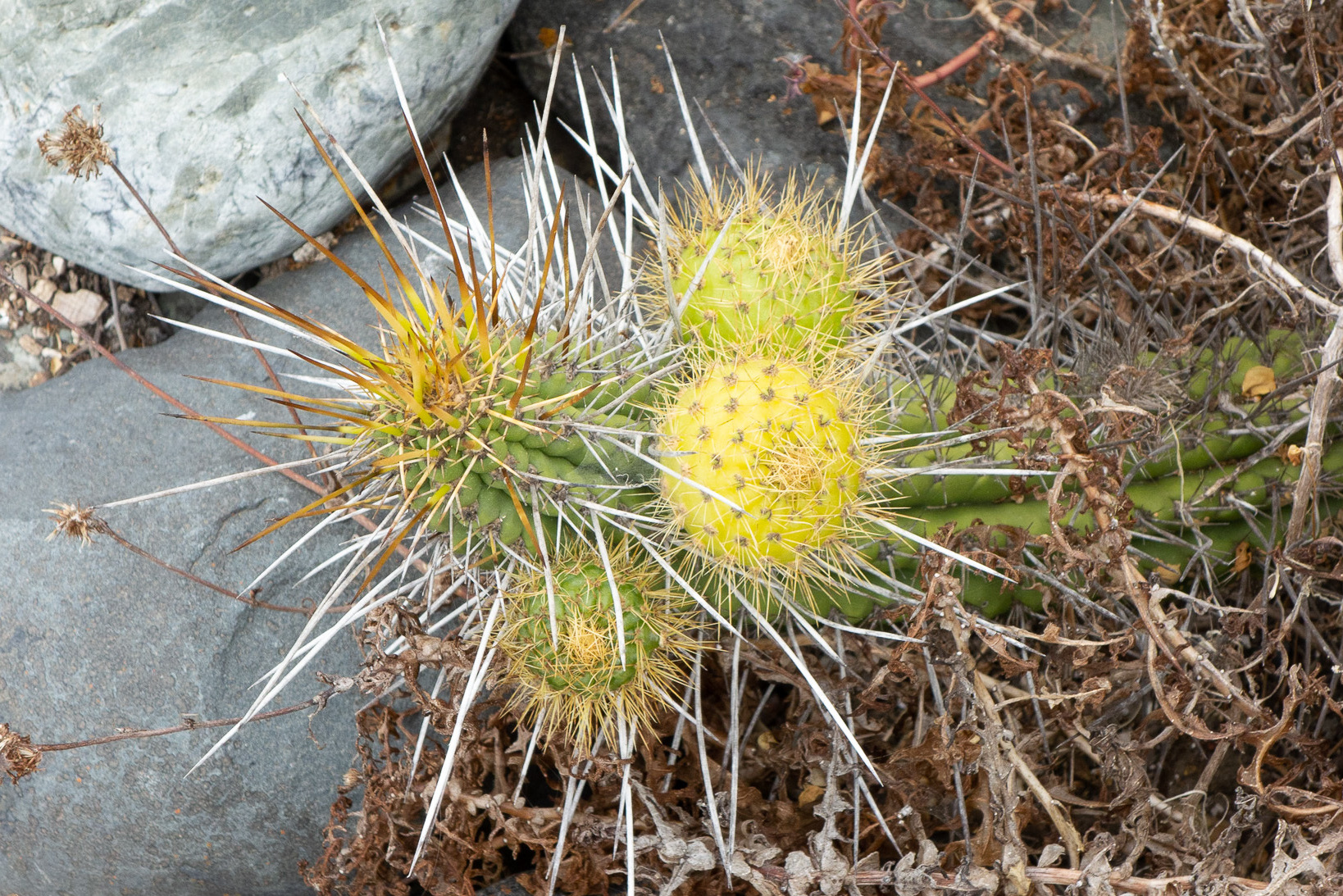
Fruits

== Distribution ==
This species is native to the coastal regions of northern Chile, specifically along the coastline from Los Molles in the Valparaíso region north to the Talinay mountain range in the Coquimbo region. It thrives in desert and dry scrub biomes, preferring coastal environments such as flat rocky surfaces, north-facing slopes, marine terraces, and ravines, typically found at elevations from sea level up to around 500 meters. The soils it grows in are chemically diverse, with pH levels between 6.5 and 8, indicating an adaptability to both slightly acidic and alkaline conditions.

Living within the extremely arid Atacama Desert, a region known for prolonged droughts of 6 to 10 months and minimal rainfall (100-300 mm annually, primarily in winter), this species relies heavily on coastal fog as a crucial source of moisture. Its remarkable adaptations allow it to withstand high temperatures reaching up to 50°C. In its natural habitat, it forms specialized plant communities alongside other endemic species like Puya venusta, Vasconcellea chilensis, Myrcianthes coquimbensis, and Eulychnia breviflora, all adapted to the harsh conditions of the coastal desert

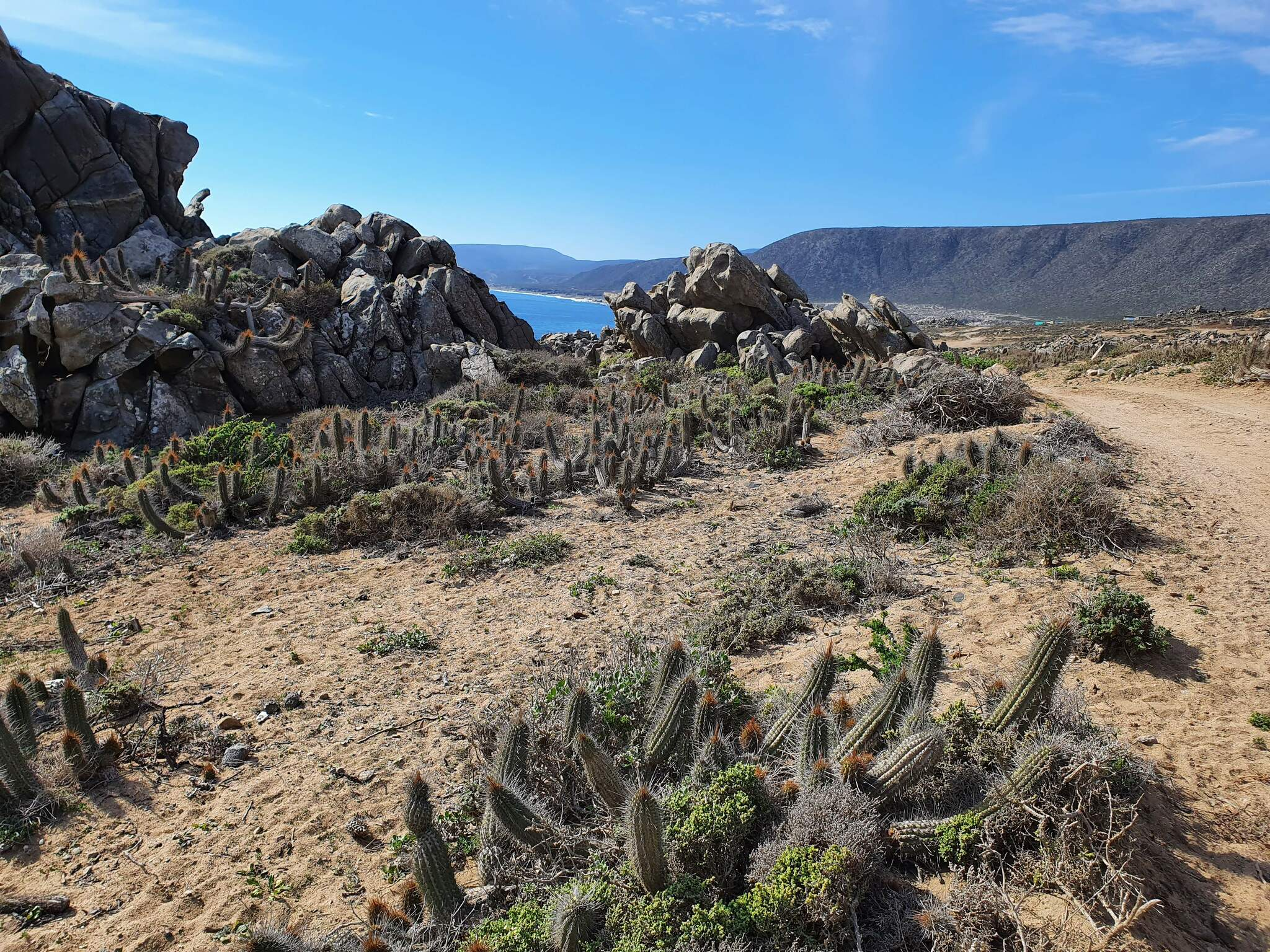
Habitat in Los Baños, Ovalle, Chile

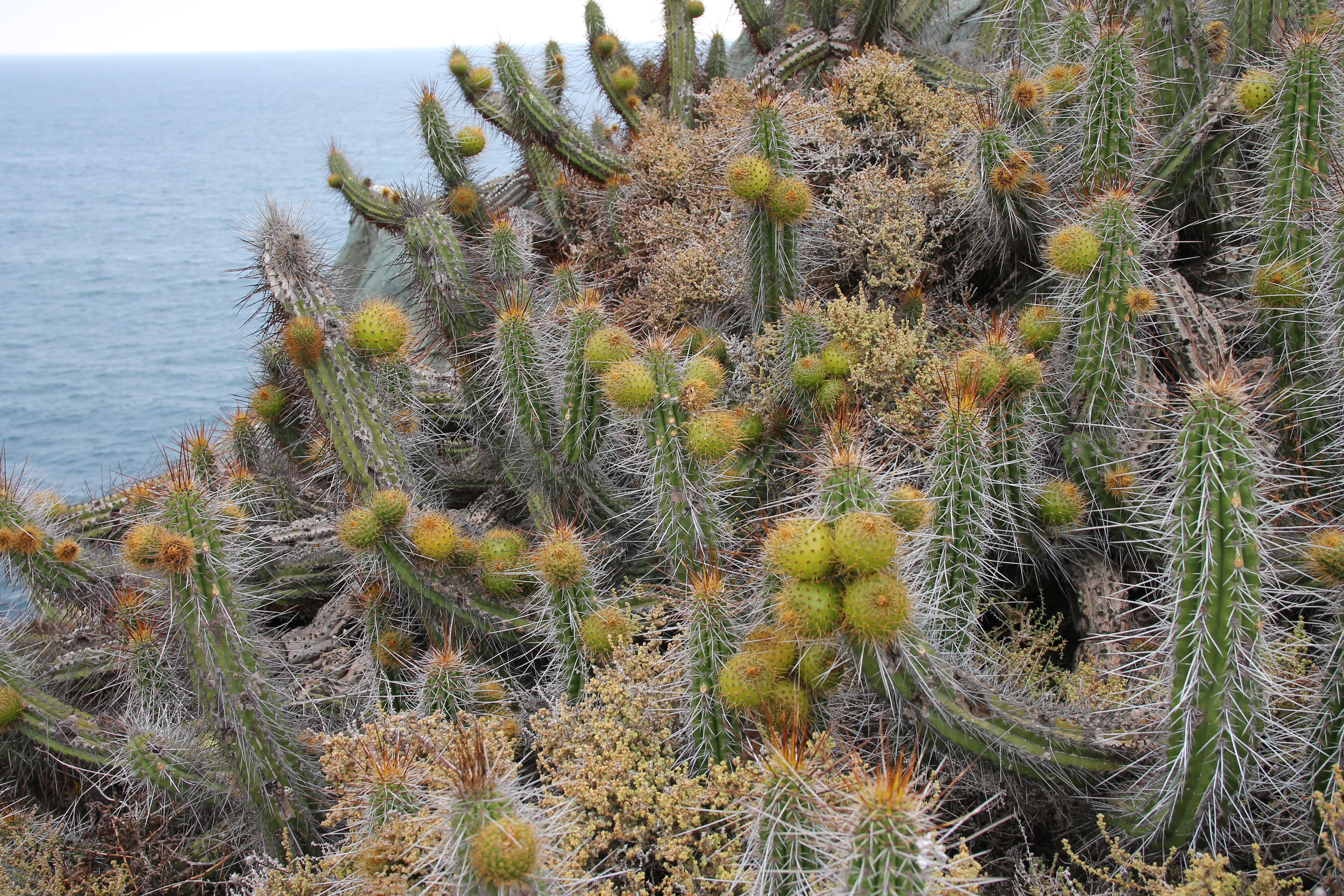
Plant fruiting in Puquén Natural reserve, Los Molles, La Ligua

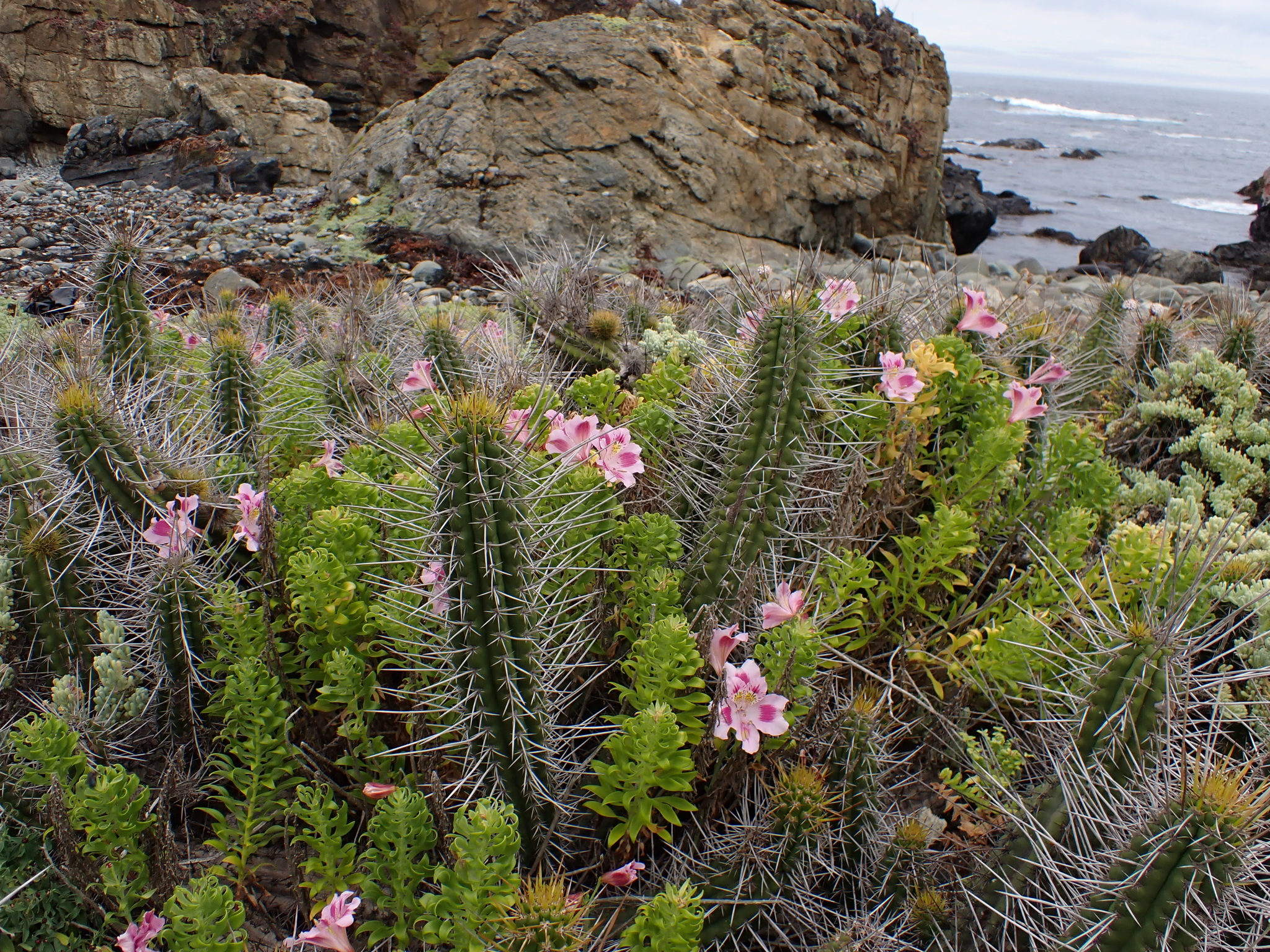
Plant growing among Alstromeria in La Ligua, Chile

== Taxonomy ==
Eulychnia castanea was first described by German botanist Rodolfo Amando Philippi in 1864 and published in the journal Linnaea. The species name, derived from the Latin word for 'chestnut,' refers to its spiny fruits that resemble chestnut burrs.
