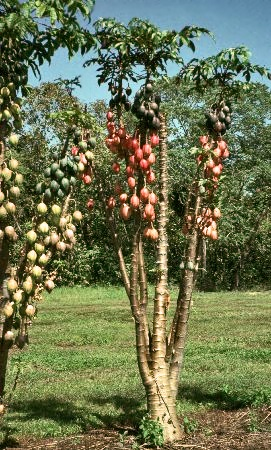

Scientific classification
- Kingdom: Plantae
- Clade: Tracheophytes
- Clade: Angiosperms
- Clade: Eudicots
- Clade: Rosids
- Order: Brassicales
- Family: Caricaceae
- Genus: Vasconcellea
- Species: V. goudotiana

Binomial name
- Vasconcellea goudotiana Triana & Planch.

Synonyms
- Carica goudotiana (Triana & Planch.) Solms

= Vasconcellea goudotiana =

Species of flowering plant

Vasconcellea goudotiana (also known as papayuelo) is a species of flowering plant in the family Caricaceae. It is endemic to Colombia. The plant has a chromosome count of 2n = 18.

It was previously placed in genus Carica.

== Gallery ==
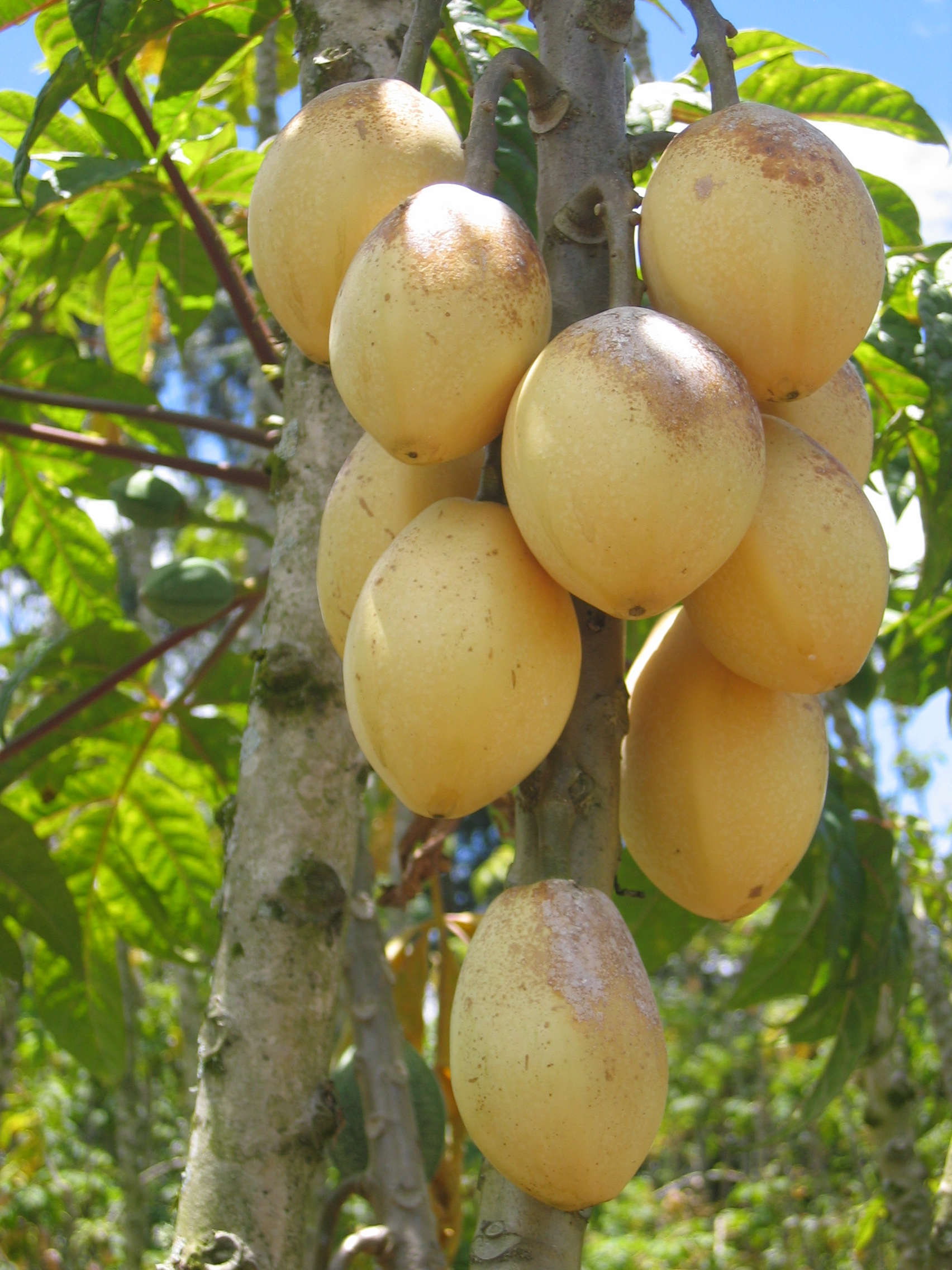
Vasconcellea goudotiana with Yellow fruits

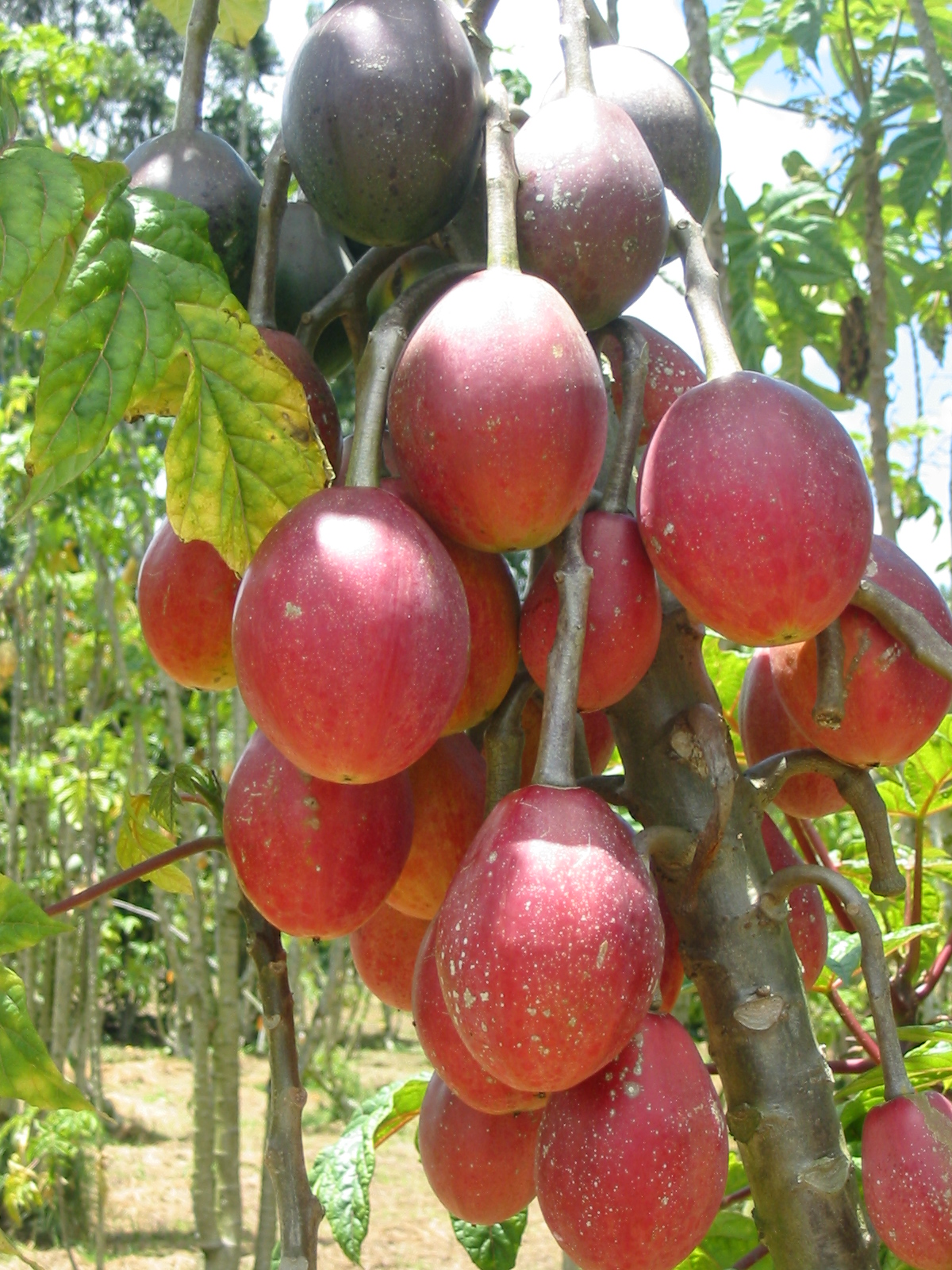
Vasconcellea goudotiana with red fruits
