= Vasconcellea pulchra =

Conservation status
- Near Threatened (IUCN 3.1)

Scientific classification
- Kingdom: Plantae
- Clade: Tracheophytes
- Clade: Angiosperms
- Clade: Eudicots
- Clade: Rosids
- Order: Brassicales
- Family: Caricaceae
- Genus: Vasconcellea
- Species: V. pulchra

Binomial name
- Vasconcellea pulchra (V.M. Badillo) V.M. Badillo

Species of flowering plant

Vasconcellea pulchra is a species of plant in the family Caricaceae. It is endemic to Ecuador. Its natural habitat is subtropical or tropical moist montane forest. It is threatened by habitat loss.

It was previously placed in genus Carica.
