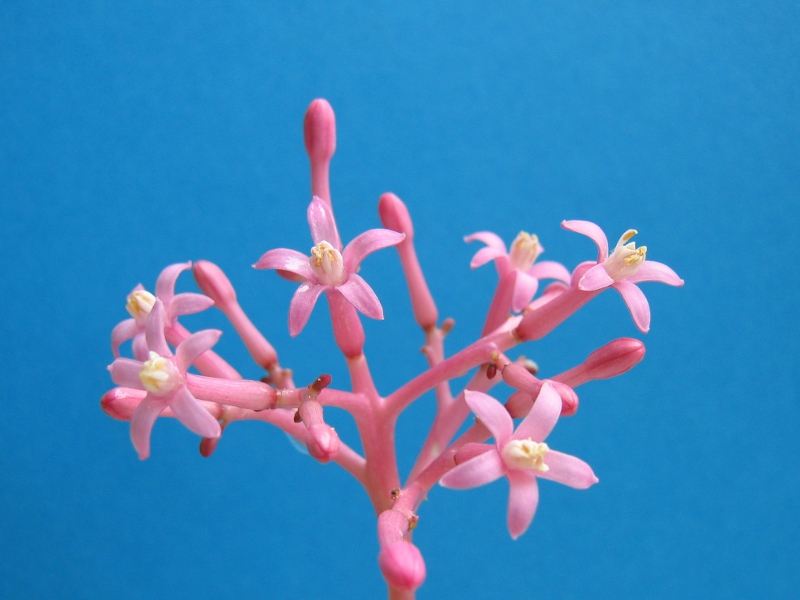

Conservation status
- Least Concern (IUCN 3.1)

Scientific classification
- Kingdom: Plantae
- Clade: Tracheophytes
- Clade: Angiosperms
- Clade: Eudicots
- Clade: Rosids
- Order: Brassicales
- Family: Caricaceae
- Genus: Vasconcellea
- Species: V. parviflora

Binomial name
- Vasconcellea parviflora A.DC.

Synonyms
- Carica parviflora (A.DC.) Solms; Carica leptantha Harms; Carica paniculata Spruce ex Solms; Papaya paniculata (Spruce) Kuntze; Papaya parviflora (A. DC.) Kuntze

= Vasconcellea parviflora =

Species of shrub

Vasconcellea parviflora is a species of shrub in the family Caricaceae. It is native to SW Ecuador and NW Peru. It is polygamous, i.e. it can be dioecious or monoecious, showing either or both pistillate and staminate flowers (Badillo, 1993).
