= Vasconcellea sprucei =

Conservation status
- Near Threatened (IUCN 3.1)

Scientific classification
- Kingdom: Plantae
- Clade: Tracheophytes
- Clade: Angiosperms
- Clade: Eudicots
- Clade: Rosids
- Order: Brassicales
- Family: Caricaceae
- Genus: Vasconcellea
- Species: V. sprucei

Binomial name
- Vasconcellea sprucei (V.M. Badillo) V.M. Badillo

Species of flowering plant

Vasconcellea sprucei is a species of plant in the family Caricaceae. It is endemic to Ecuador. Its natural habitat is subtropical or tropical moist montane forest. It is threatened by habitat loss.

It was previously placed in genus Carica.
