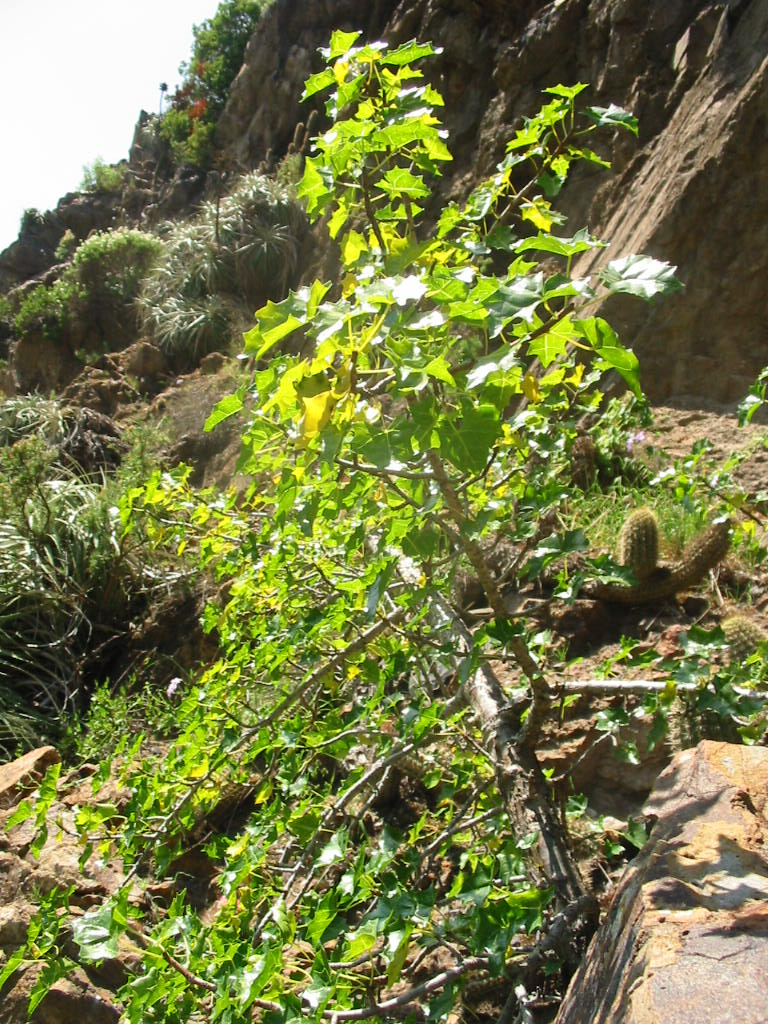

Scientific classification
- Kingdom: Plantae
- Clade: Tracheophytes
- Clade: Angiosperms
- Clade: Eudicots
- Clade: Rosids
- Order: Brassicales
- Family: Caricaceae
- Genus: Vasconcellea
- Species: V. chilensis

Binomial name
- Vasconcellea chilensis Planch. ex A. DC. 1864

Synonyms
- Carica chilensis (Triana & Planch.) Solms

= Vasconcellea chilensis =

Species of flowering plant

Vasconcellea chilensis is a species of flowering plant in the family Caricaceae. It is endemic to Chile. The plant has a chromosome count of 2n = 18.

It was previously placed in the genus Carica.

== Description ==
Monoecious or dioecious shrub, deciduous in summer, reaching a size of 1–3 m in height; It has a thick and succulent trunk, the exfoliating bark at the base of adult trees. Leaves very variable in shape, ovate, deltoid, some heart-shaped at the base and divided into 5 angular, membranous lobes; with 3–4 cm petiole. Flowers 5–6 mm long, red on the outside and green on the inside, male flowers are born in small clusters; solitary female flowers. The fruit is ovoid, brownish-green with oval seeds wrapped in mucilage

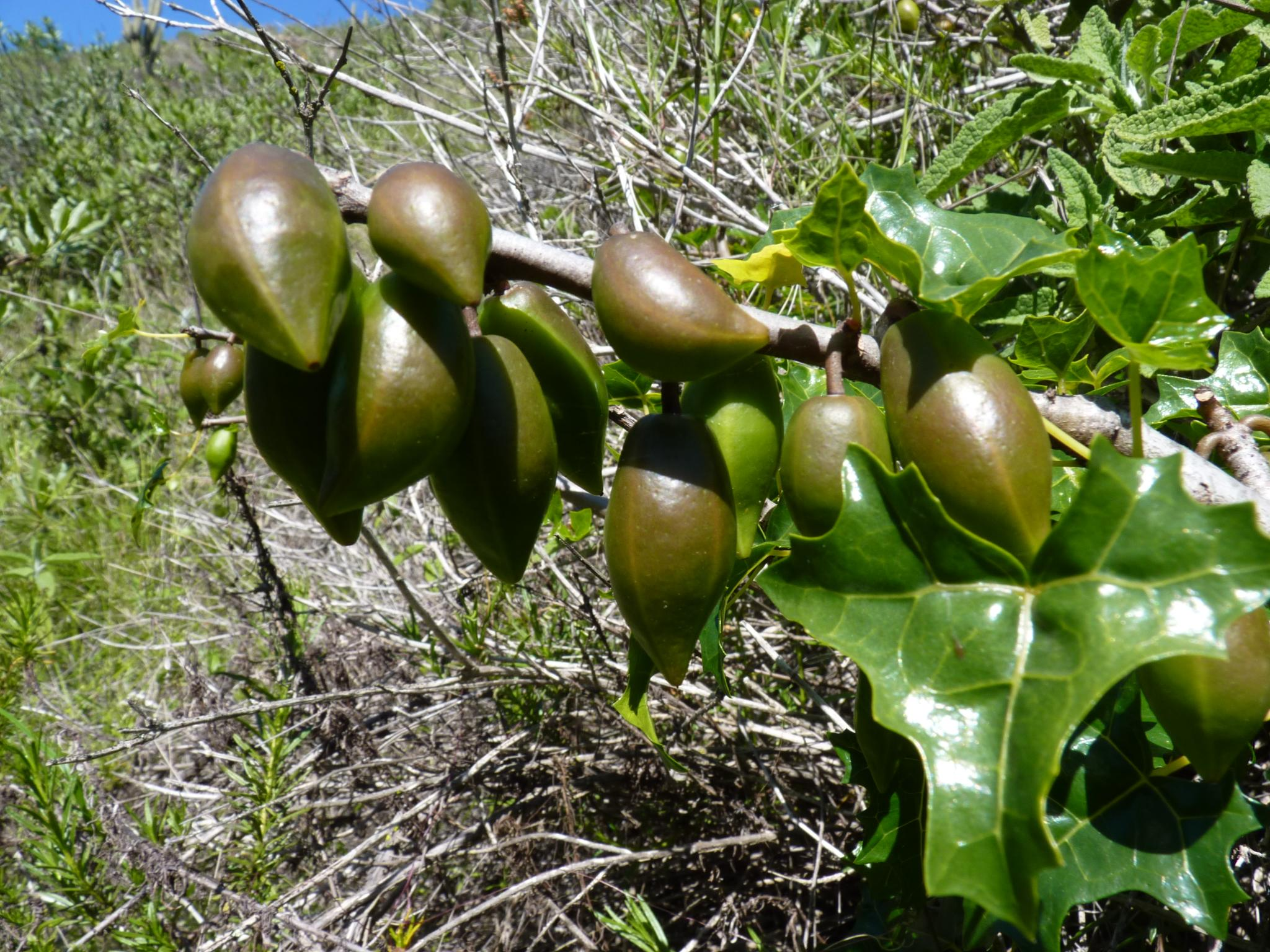

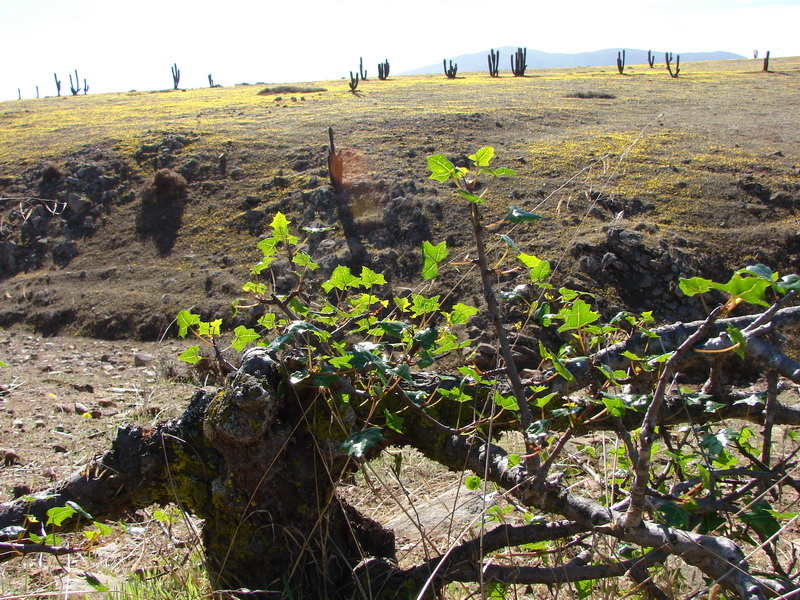
