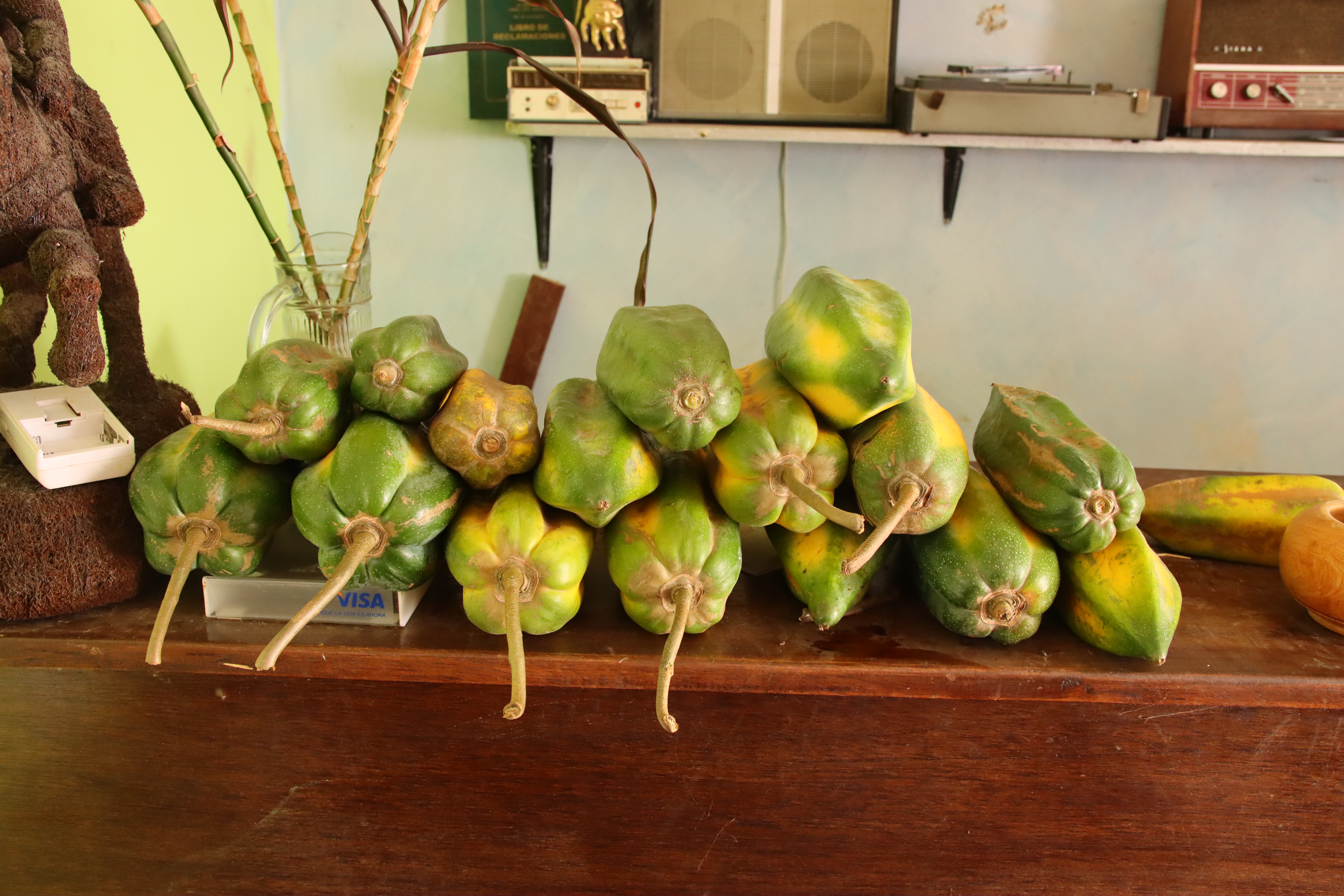
- Babaco fruit being sold as food

Scientific classification
- Kingdom: Plantae
- Clade: Tracheophytes
- Clade: Angiosperms
- Clade: Eudicots
- Clade: Rosids
- Order: Brassicales
- Family: Caricaceae
- Genus: Vasconcellea
- Species: V. × heilbornii

Binomial name
- Vasconcellea × heilbornii (V.M.Badillo) V.M.Badillo

= Babaco =

Hybrid species of tree

The babaco (Vasconcellea × heilbornii; syn. Carica pentagona), is a hybrid cultivar in the genus Vasconcellea from Ecuador. It is a hybrid between Vasconcellea cundinamarcensis (syn. Carica pubescens, "mountain papaya"), and Vasconcellea stipulata (syn. Carica stipulata, "toronche") although Vasconcellea weberbaueri has also been mentioned as a contributor to the hybrid.

== Growth ==
It can grow at high altitudes over 2,000 m (6,600 ft), and is the most cold-tolerant plant in the genus Vasconcellea. The babaco is classified as a herbaceous shrub like Carica papaya (papaya) but unlike papaya it produces only female flowers. The babaco plant can produce from 30 to 60 fruits annually, and has an average life span of about eight years. The small plant is better suited as a container specimen than its cousin the papaya, which needs constant moisture and high temperatures to survive.

The plant is easy to cultivate under greenhouse conditions (Kempler et al., 1993). Propagation of the plant is achieved by rooting axillary shoots. The opening of axillary buds and subsequent shoot growth is stimulated by removing the apical meristem. The shoots are cut at 15–25 cm (6–10 in) long and only the apical leaf is kept. The basal area of the stem is mildly injured and dipped in 0.4% IBA rooting powder and planted into suitable rooting media such as peat:perlite:sand and placed under intermittent mist. The cutting can be ready for transplanting within 3 weeks. Top-prunings (to reduce the height of the plant) may also be used as giant cuttings, up to 1.5 m (5 ft) long, if protected against drying out.

In contrast to the tropical papaya, babaco requires a cool subtropical climate. Recommended greenhouse minimum temperature of 10 °C (50 °F) at night, 12 °C (54 °F) during the day, and 18 °C (64 °F) for fruit to ripen quickly and uniformly. Excessively low temperatures cause fruit to mature with rough, pitted skin.

The flowering habit is indeterminate. Under greenhouse conditions, plant growth during winter months (October to March at 49° north) is slow, and flowers senesce and fail to set fruit (Kempler et al., 1993). In Ecuador, the trees begin cropping 10 months after planting and continue bearing for 6 months, producing about 40 fruits per tree with each weighing about 1–1.5 kg (2–3 lb), in the greenhouse we produced about 32 kg/m^{2} (6.6 lb/sq ft) of fruit in 16 months when planted at 0.8 plants per square metre (0.074 per square foot), and 25 kg/m^{2} (5 lb/sq ft) after 12 months spaced at 3 per square metre (0.28 per square foot). Because of the heavy fruit load a support system for the plants was required. Small fruit size can be achieved by growing plants at high densities. Fruit begins to mature with gradual color change from green to yellow and, if harvest is delayed, the fruit stalk will abscise and fruit will drop and bruise. The delicate-skinned fruit is harvested with pruners with a short stalk and handled carefully. In northern climate, ripening begins in November (March planting), and continues until June. During this period new flowers are set (April to September) and the second crop starts to ripen in November, the plant is cut above the last-formed fruit as flowers senesce in October. After the end of the second season, cropping plants can be cut and rejuvenated from the base or replaced with new plants.

== Cultural importance ==
Babaco sweet fruit consumption is of considerable cultural importance in the mountainous regions of Andean countries, specially in Ecuador. The fruit is commonly eaten in the Ecuadorian Sierra as fruit marmalade, boiled with sugar to make dulce de babaco, in juice, or as flavoring of traditional sweets. Boiled babaco texture has been described close to that of boiled apple. The fruit is used mainly in confections, pastry and juices.

== Characteristics ==
It is a small, unbranched or sparsely branched tree reaching 5–8 m tall. The fruit differs from the related papaya (C. papaya) in being narrower, typically less than 10 cm in diameter. The babaco fruit is seedless and the smooth skin can be eaten, and is said to have tastes of strawberry, papaya, kiwi and pineapple. The fruit is pentagonal in shape, therefore giving it the scientific name of Vasconcellea pentagona. The fruit is not especially acidic, but contains papain, a proteolytic enzyme, which may cause mild irritation or "burns".

Like the papaya, the babaco is grown for its edible fruit and for its fruit juice. Cultivation away from its native range has been successful as far south as New Zealand, and as far north as California, some regions of England, Guernsey, Channel Islands, and somewhat also in Italy (mostly Sicily and Calabria).
