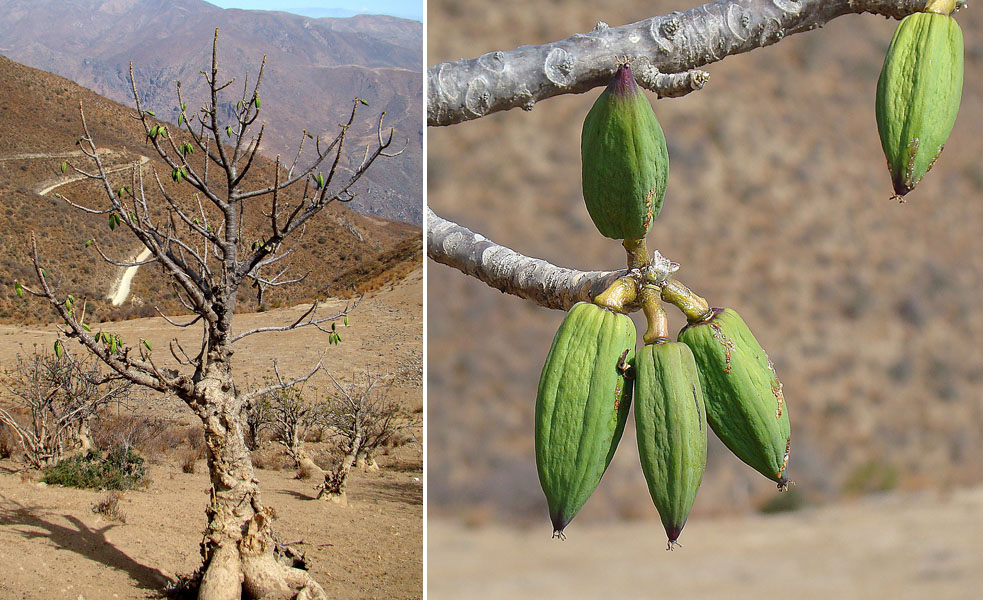

Scientific classification
- Kingdom: Plantae
- Clade: Tracheophytes
- Clade: Angiosperms
- Clade: Eudicots
- Clade: Rosids
- Order: Brassicales
- Family: Caricaceae
- Genus: Vasconcellea
- Species: V. candicans

Binomial name
- Vasconcellea candicans (A.Gray) A.DC.

= Vasconcellea candicans =

Species of tree

Vasconcellea candicans is a small tree native to the western slopes of the Andes in southern Ecuador and Peru.

== Description ==
Small dioecious shrub or tree to 8 m high. Leaves ovate or almost rounded, with a slightly cordate base, margin entire or sometimes sinuately dentate and obtuse or acute apex; palmately veined; glabrous above, hairy below. Male inflorescence a small cyme with many flowers; tiny 5- or 7-lobed calyx; 5- or 7- lobed corolla; stamens twice as many as the lobes of the corolla, with linear-oblong anthers. Flowers greenish to purplish. Fruit ellipsoidal, yellow green at maturity, 10-18 x 4-6 cm; many seeds.

== Vernacular names ==
Chungay (in Ecuador).

Mito, uliucana, jerju, odeque (in Peru).

== Uses ==
Edible fruit.

== Cultivation ==
Propagated by seeds.
