= Cylicomorpha =

Scientific classification
- Kingdom: Plantae
- Clade: Tracheophytes
- Clade: Angiosperms
- Clade: Eudicots
- Clade: Rosids
- Order: Brassicales
- Family: Caricaceae
- Genus: Cylicomorpha; Urb., 1901

Species
- C. parviflora Urb.; C. solmsii (Urb.) Urb.

Genus of flowering plants

Cylicomorpha is a plant genus consisting of two species that are native to the African tropics. They are the only African representatives of the Caricaceae, and are consequently related to the papaya.

== Habit and appearance ==
They have the habit of bottle trees, and their soft, dilated trunks are armed with short conical spines. The leaves are digitately lobed. They are strictly dioecious, and like all Caricaceae, produce abundant milky sap when damaged. The inflorescences are axillary. The male panicles hold many flowers, while the female flowers are solitary or borne in small numbers on short racemes.

== Species ==
Image	Scientific name	Distribution
	C. parviflora Urb.	eastern Kenya, Tanzania
	C. solmsii (Urb.) Urb.	Cameroon

== Range and occurrence ==
They occur as tall-growing, pioneer plants in moist submontane habitats, where they are local but gregarious. The western species, C. solmsii is locally threatened by clearance for agriculture and wood, and may be extinct at Mount Cameroon and at Barombi, Kumba.

== Species interactions ==
The fruit of both species are eaten by birds and primates.
