= Caudex =

Biological structure in a plant stem

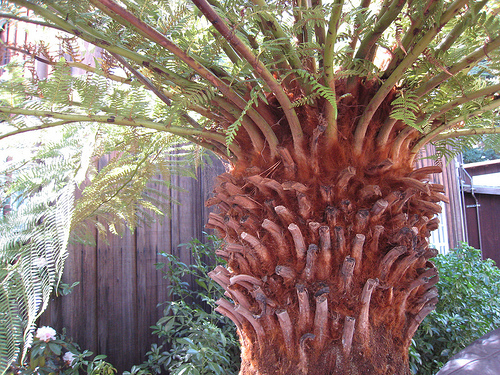
The caudex of a tree fern resembles the trunk of a woody plant, but has a different structure.

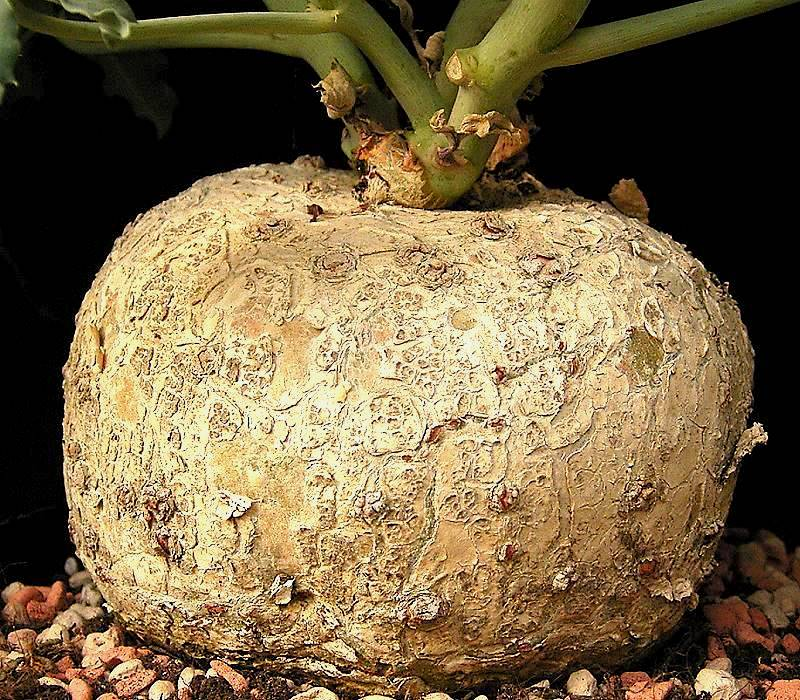
The caudex of Jatropha cathartica is pachycaul, with thickening that provides water storage.

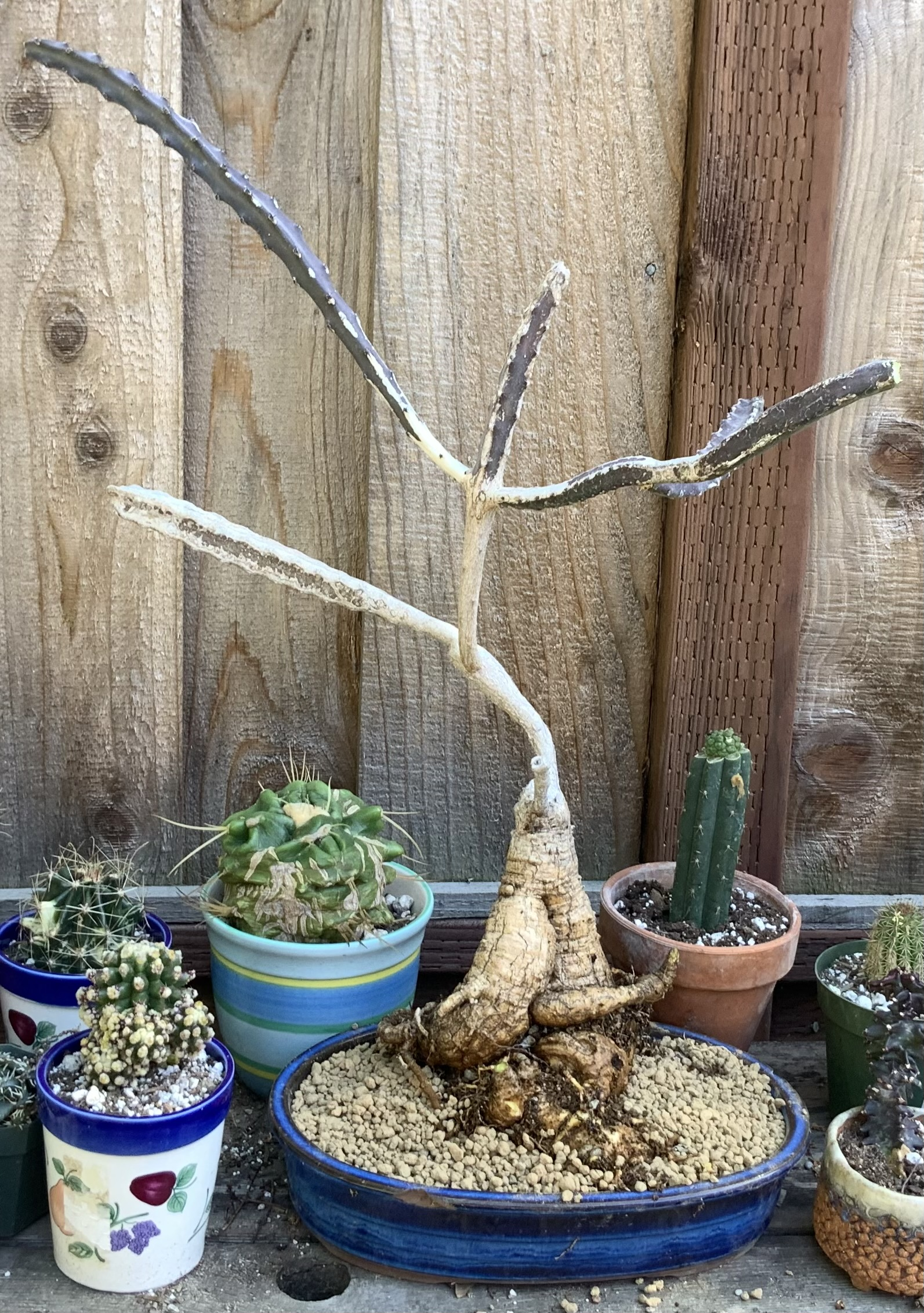
Certain cacti can develop a caudex too; here Acanthocereus maculatus

A caudex (pl.: caudices) of a plant is a stem, but the term is also used to mean a rootstock and particularly a basal stem structure from which new growth arises.

In the strict sense of the term, meaning a stem, "caudex" is most often used with plants that have a different stem morphology from the typical angiosperm dicotyledon stem; examples include palms, ferns, cycads, and Welwitschia. The largest of all caudices is that of the ombu (Phytolacca dioica) of the Pampas of South America, which can reach up to 14 metres girth.

The related term caudiciform, literally meaning stem-like, is sometimes used to mean pachycaul, thick-stemmed. Caudices should not be confused with lignotubers which can also be very large.

== Etymology ==
The term derives from the Latin caudex, a noun meaning "tree trunk"; 'codex' is an alternate form of the same word.

== See also ==
- Stipe
