= Vasconcellea horovitziana =

Conservation status
- Endangered (IUCN 3.1)

Scientific classification
- Kingdom: Plantae
- Clade: Tracheophytes
- Clade: Angiosperms
- Clade: Eudicots
- Clade: Rosids
- Order: Brassicales
- Family: Caricaceae
- Genus: Vasconcellea
- Species: V. horovitziana

Binomial name
- Vasconcellea horovitziana (V.M. Badillo) V.M. Badillo

Species of flowering plant

Vasconcellea horovitziana is a species of plant in the family Caricaceae. It is endemic to Ecuador. Its natural habitat is subtropical or tropical moist lowland forest. It is threatened by habitat loss.

It was formerly placed in genus Carica.
