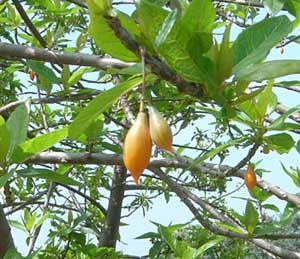

Scientific classification
- Kingdom: Plantae
- Clade: Tracheophytes
- Clade: Angiosperms
- Clade: Eudicots
- Clade: Rosids
- Order: Brassicales
- Family: Caricaceae
- Genus: Vasconcellea
- Species: V. quercifolia

Binomial name
- Vasconcellea quercifolia A.St.-Hil.

Synonyms
- Carica quercifolia

= Vasconcellea quercifolia =

Species of tree

Vasconcellea quercifolia is a species of shrub or tree in the family Caricaceae. It is found in Argentina, Peru, Brazil, Paraguay, Uruguay, Bolivia and Ecuador.
