= Horovitzia =

Scientific classification
- Kingdom: Plantae
- Clade: Tracheophytes
- Clade: Angiosperms
- Clade: Eudicots
- Clade: Rosids
- Order: Brassicales
- Family: Caricaceae
- Genus: Horovitzia; V.M.Badillo (1993)
- Species: H. cnidoscoloides

Binomial name
- Horovitzia cnidoscoloides (Lorence & R.Torres) V.M.Badillo (1993)

Synonyms
- Carica cnidoscoloides Lorence & R.Torres (1988)

Genus of flowering plants

Horovitzia cnidoscoloides is a plant species in the family Caricaceae, endemic to the cloud forest of Sierra de Juarez in Oaxaca, Mexico at elevations of 800 to 1600 meters. It is the only species in the genus Horovitzia. The type specimen was collected in Ixtlán de Juárez, Oaxaca on 9 March 1986.

== Description ==
Small evergreen dioecious tree 0.5–4 meters tall, with subcapitate stigma, and stinging hairs covering the entire plant. Male flowers have a 3–10 cm long peduncle. Fruits are 6–15 cm long, green when mature, pendulous, ellipsoid with strong ridges. The plant has a chromosome count of 2n = 16.
