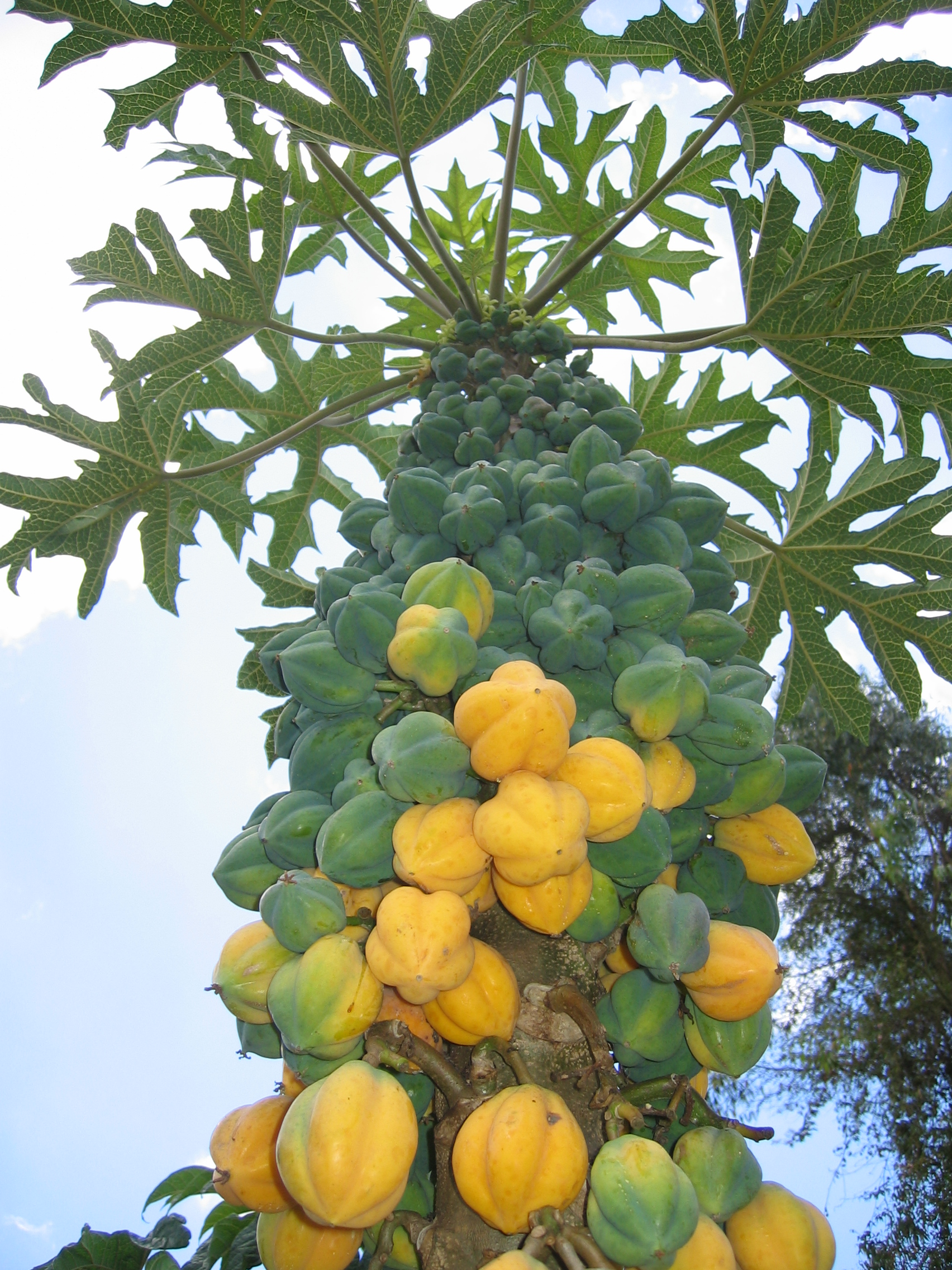

Scientific classification
- Kingdom: Plantae
- Clade: Embryophytes
- Clade: Tracheophytes
- Clade: Angiosperms
- Clade: Eudicots
- Clade: Rosids
- Order: Brassicales
- Family: Caricaceae
- Genus: Vasconcellea
- Species: V. pubescens

Binomial name
- Vasconcellea pubescens A.DC.

Synonyms
- Carica pubescens Lenné & K.Koch; Vasconcellea cundinamarcensis Badillo; Carica candamarcensis; Carica cestriflora; Carica chiriquensis; Carica cundinamarcensis; Carica pubescens; Papaya cundinamarcencis; Papaya pubescens; Vasconcellea cestriflora

= Mountain papaya =

Species of plant

The mountain papaya (Vasconcellea pubescens) also known as mountain pawpaw, papayuelo, chamburo, or simply "papaya" is a species of the genus Vasconcellea, native to the Andes of northwestern South America from Colombia south to central Chile, typically growing at altitudes of 1,500–3,000 metres (4,900–9,800 ft).

It has also been known as Carica pubescens.

== Description ==
Vasconcellea pubescens is an evergreen pachycaul shrub or small tree with an average height of ca. 5 metres (16 ft) and can grow up to 10 metres (33 ft) tall. It has one central stem and palmate leaves of 5–7 lobes with thick pubescence on the underside of the leaf and petiole. The petioles are long and the top of the leaf has no pubescence. It has a fast growth rate which is one of the reasons it is considered invasive in some regions (see section Invasiveness) and it has an ecological preference for higher altitudes.

This plant is mostly dioecious but can be found to be monoecious or even andromonoecious. The existence of flowers of different sexes appears to depend on the season.

The fruits are arranged spirally along the trunk and a single tree can produce 50–60 fruits per year. The fruit is 6–15 centimetres (2.4–5.9 in) long and 3–8 centimetres (1.2–3.1 in) broad, with five broad longitudinal ribs from base to apex; it is green, maturing yellow to orange. The fruit pulp is edible, similar to papaya, and is usually cooked as a vegetable. It is also eaten raw.

== Breeding and cultivars ==
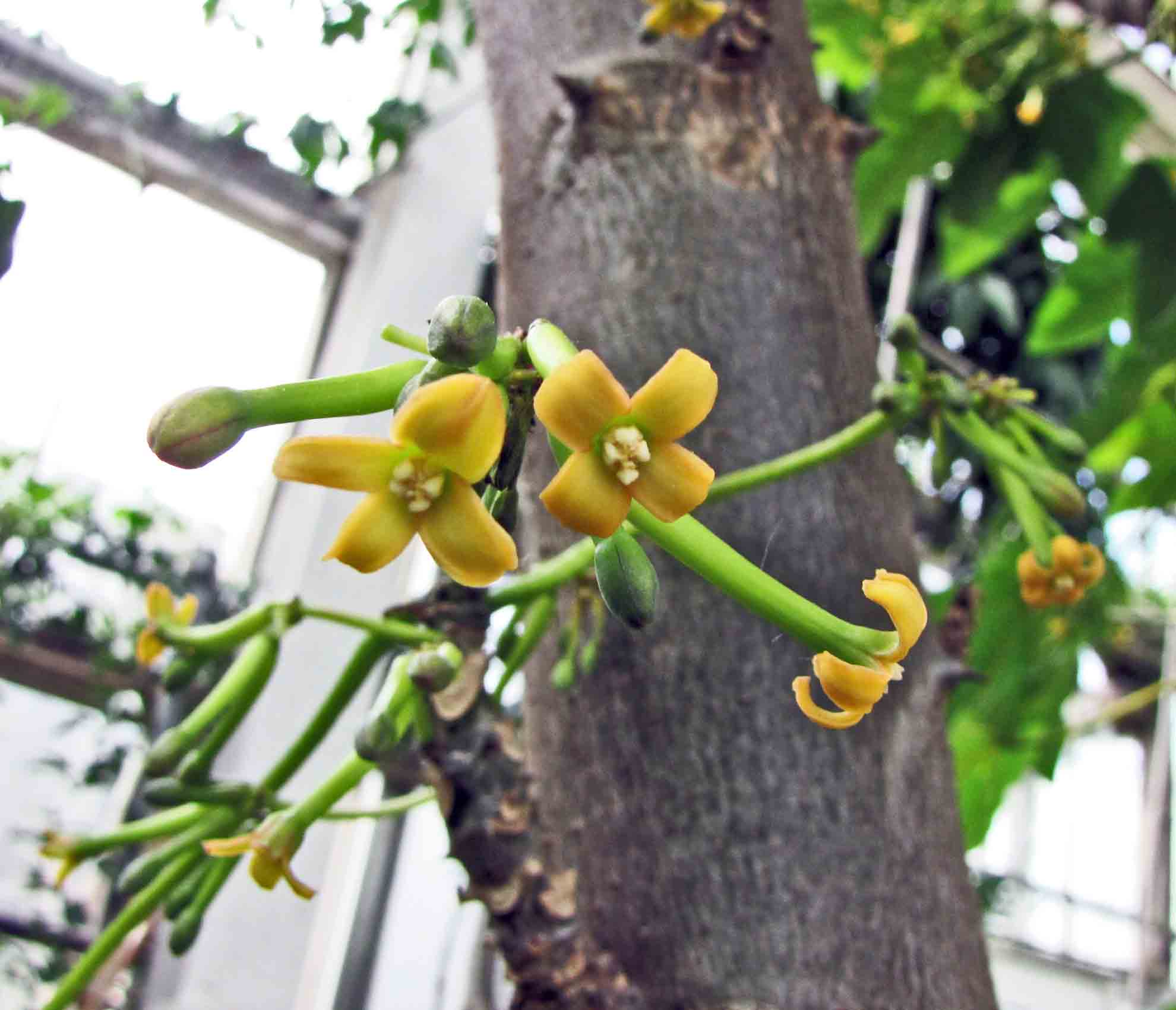
Flower of the mountain papaya

Vasconcellea pubescens is interfertile with other highland papayas giving it a lot of breeding potential. It is one of the parents of the 'Babaco' papaya, a hybrid cultivar widely grown for fruit production in South America, and in subtropical portions of North America.

The papaya ringspot virus (PRSV) presents a significant problem for papaya production worldwide. By contrast, V. pubescens has been consistently reported to be resistant to PRSV-P. Attempts at introducing resistance into C. papaya via hybridization with V. pubescens have been made, which have so far led to the development of resistant and vigorous, but sterile F1 hybrids. Such hybrids also demonstrated resistance to black spot (Asperisporium caricae). Cold tolerance in V. pubescens has also been noticed as a trait of interest for introgression into C. papaya.

== Cultivation ==
This plant grows in a temperature range of 10–28 °C (50–82 °F) but an average temperature of 17 °C (63 °F) is preferred. V. pubescens is sensitive to cold: the stem and leaves could be affected leading to complete plant death when temperatures fall below 2 °C (36 °F). However, it is more cold tolerant than the common papaya. The mountain papaya requires a well drained soil and well established plants can tolerate prolonged drought periods. However, younger/smaller plants are not tolerant to drought. The preferable soil pH range is 6.5–7, but can tolerate a pH range of 4.5–8.4.

=== Propagation ===
Growers usually produce their own planting material from their own orchards. The main reproductive mode is via seeds. They are sown in containers which receive only indirect light. Germination is best at a temperature around 24–30 °C (75–86 °F). In case of dioecious plants, both males and females are planted separately. Germination takes 2–6 weeks. When plants are about 2 weeks old, the plants are transferred to a sunny location. They are later planted out into permanent locations when the plants are deemed large enough.

=== Harvest and processing ===
The mountain papaya fruit is harvested when it is anywhere from 5–20 centimetres (2.0–7.9 in) long, 5–6 centimetres (2.0–2.4 in) in diameter, and an average weight of 200 grams (7.1 oz). During fruit softening the fruit undergoes textural changes due to cell wall modifications that occur through the synergistic action of a complex group of proteins. Since the mountain papaya is a climacteric fruit, ethylene drives fruit ripening, which is initiated by degreening of the peel, followed by changes in pH, titratable acidity, soluble solids and pulp softening. Over storage time, the polyphenol concentration in the fruit decreases.

=== Pests and diseases ===
In general this species is resistant or tolerant to most pests and diseases which is why it is popular in breeding programs for crop improvement. The breeding potential and pest and diseases susceptibility varies between varieties. Some of the pests and diseases that can be observed include the Fall Armyworm and Papaya Ringspot Virus.

== Uses ==
=== Culinary uses ===
The mountain papaya fruit is normally eaten cooked, although some people do eat it raw. Since it has a naturally sourish pulp, it is usually sweetened with sugar or used in preserves, jams, juices, and ice creams. It can also be added to soups and stews to add rich, fruity flavors. The aroma of the fruit is considered to be one of the most important attributes since it is very strong and fruity, due to the complex volatile compounds in the flesh. The papain enzyme present in the milky latex of immature fruits and leaves is often used in the culinary industry as a meat tenderizer since it is a digestive enzyme. Traditionally, the mountain papaya fruit is also prepared as an infused drink including passion fruit, apple, and other fruits and is often sold by street vendors.

=== Commercial uses ===
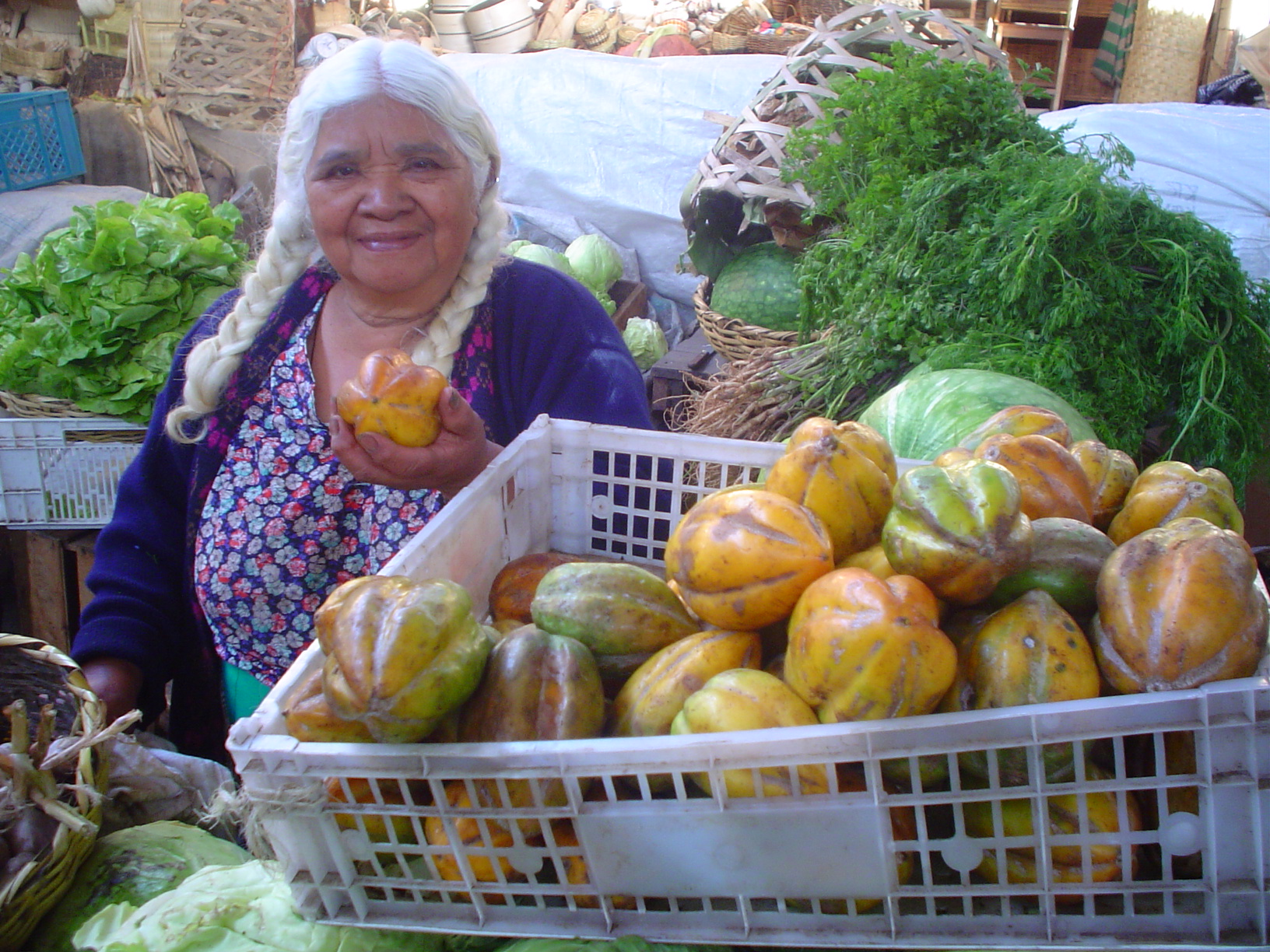
Woman selling mountain papayas

Mountain papaya fruit has a high potential for commercial use in warm temperate zones. The fruit is currently often gathered in the wild and sold in local markets. So far the species has been commercially cultivated in Chile, Sri Lanka, Indonesia, East Africa, and the southeastern United States and islands. In commercial production the plants are reproduced via seed, which only take one year to reach reproductive age and can be kept for up to 5 years with profitable yields. Although production progressively decreases after 5 years, some plants have been kept commercially for up to 20 years in some Chilean orchards.

=== Medicinal uses ===
High concentrations of the milky latex containing papain (a digestive enzyme) has been reported to help some people with indigestion (dyspeptics); it contains a cysteine endopeptidase mixture especially present in immature fruits that is used commercially by the pharmaceutical and food industries. The latex proteinases from the milky sap have been effectively tested on rodents to treat gastric ulcers. They have also been reported to treat diabetic foot treatments and gastric ulcers in several wounded models as well as reducing melanoma and metastasis levels in animal tumors. Traditionally in the central highlands of Colombia an infusion is made to combat cold and flu diseases.

Research has found promise in the use of proteolytic fractions from the unripe fruit in the treatment of wounds and ulcers.

== Nutrition ==
The fruit is rich in many important nutritional compounds, such as vitamins A, B, and C, antioxidants, flavonols, carotenoids, and papain. The high contents of antioxidant polyphenols such as the flavonols, flavonoids, and carotenoids are present in the fruits and leaves, although only the fruits are commonly consumed. There are particularly high concentrations of quercetin glycosides, rutin, and manghaslin, which are not produced by the common papaya. The proteolytic enzyme papain is produced in 5-8 times the quantity than the common papaya, and serves as a valuable digestive enzyme in human consumption.

== History ==
The origins of the mountain papaya are not well known, but it probably originated in the Northern highlands of the Andes and may have been introduced in the North of Chile by migrations of pre-Columbian peoples.

In Chilean mythology, mountain papayas are said to have originated in the middle 16th century when a Spaniard, Juan Cisternas, fell prisoner to indigenous peoples in Norte Chico. He fell in love with Chalalupanqui, the daughter of cacique Hualpi and became engaged with her, but was murdered by another member of the tribe in a fit of jealousy. Chalalupanqui then cried, and from her tears the first papaya formed, hence their golden tearlike shape.

The cultivated surface of mountain papaya almost disappeared after the earthquake and tsunami of 2010 in the Maule Region of Chile, mainly because natural growing areas of the species were salinized and damaged by seawater.

== Invasiveness ==
Internationally, the small shrub, Vasconcellea pubescens is the only relative of papaya that has been recorded as a weed. Mountain papaya has naturalized in New Zealand where it occurs in scattered open and shrubland communities on the north island. It is considered to be 'moderately invasive' in some tropical areas.

== Gallery ==
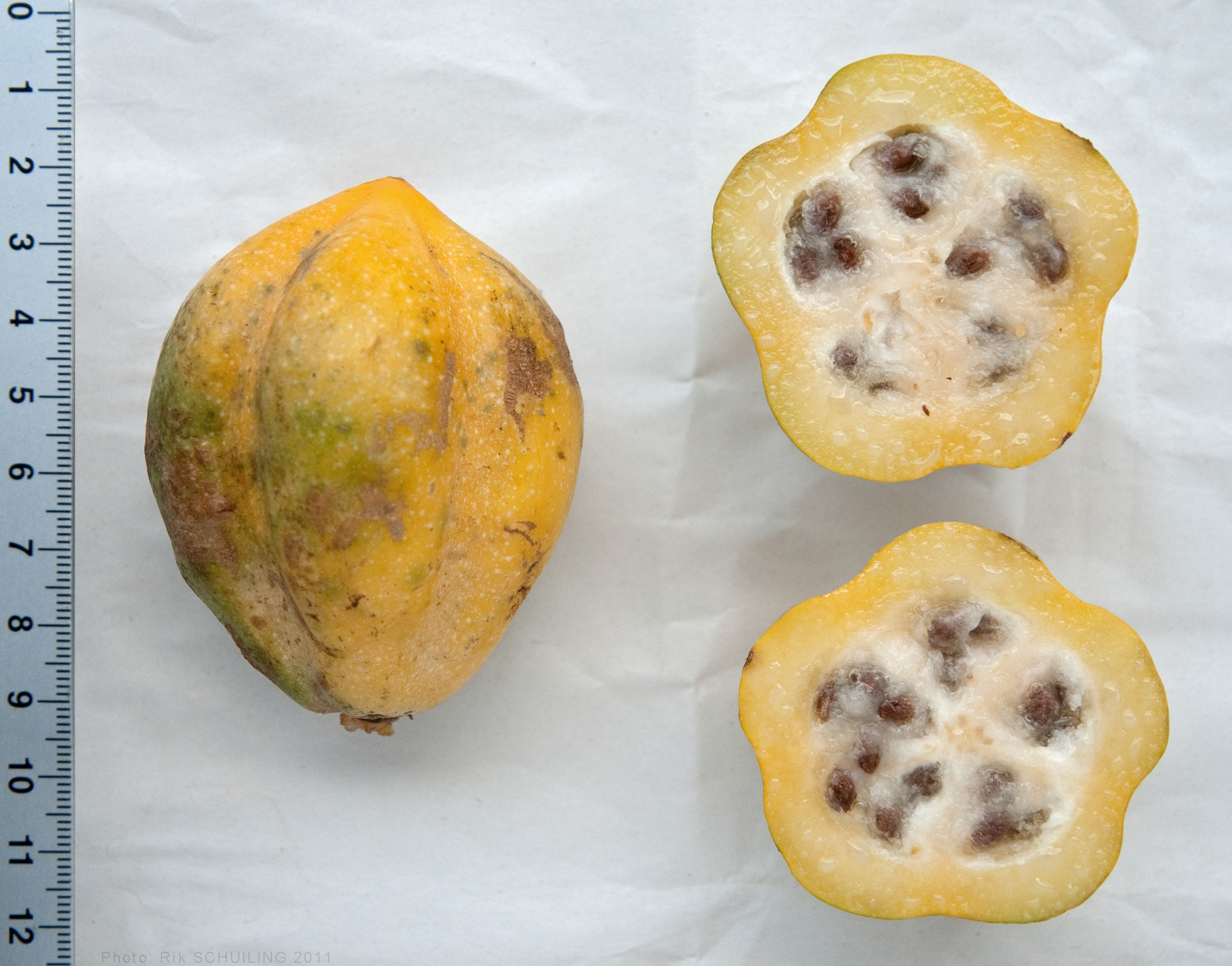
A ripe mountain papaya, whole and in cross section (Rift Valley Province, Kenya, September 2011).

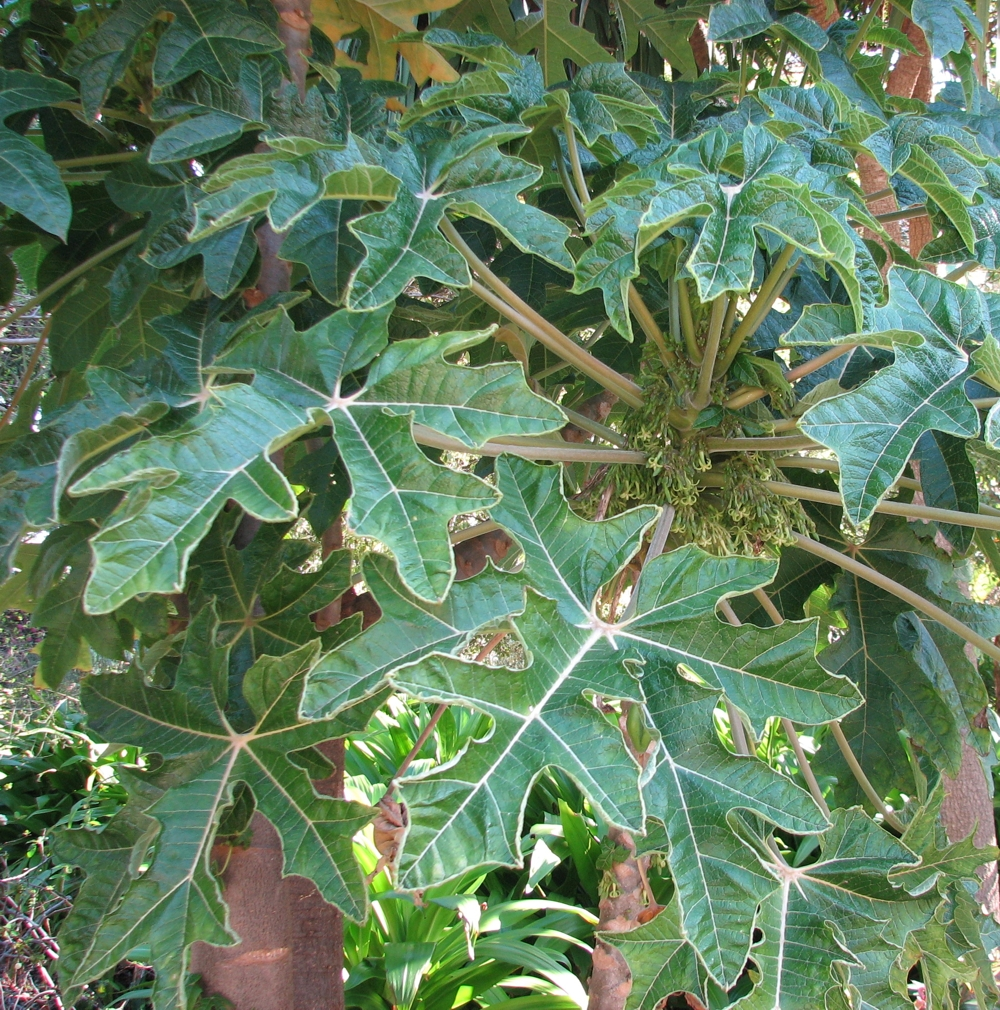
Leaves of Vasconcellea pubescens
