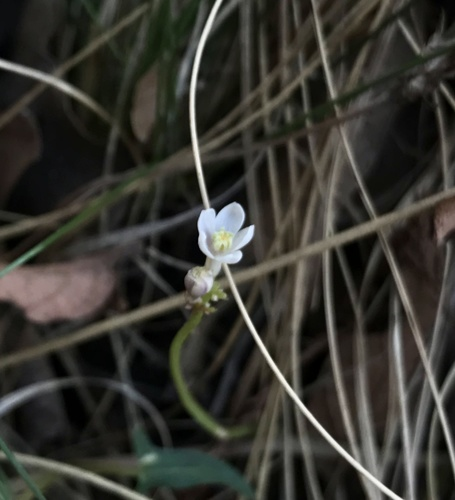

Scientific classification
- Kingdom: Plantae
- Clade: Tracheophytes
- Clade: Angiosperms
- Clade: Eudicots
- Clade: Rosids
- Order: Brassicales
- Family: Caricaceae
- Genus: Jarilla; Rusby

Species
- Jarilla caudata Jarilla chocola Jarilla heterophylla Jarilla nana

= Jarilla (genus) =

Genus of flowering plants

Jarilla is a succulent genus of herbaceous and vining plants native to central america. This genus is known for edible fruits and edible tubers.

== Species ==
The genus Jarilla has three plant species native to Mexico, Guatemala and El Salvador.

- Jarilla caudata- Mexico (Baja California Sur, Guanajuato, Hidalgo, Jalisco, Michoacan, Queretaro, San Luis Potosi, Sinaloa)
- Jarilla chocola- Mexico (Chiapas, Chihuahua, Colima, Jalisco, Michoacan, Nayarit, Oaxaca, Sinaloa, Sonora), Guatemala, El Salvador
- Jarilla heterophylla- Mexico (Colima, Ciudad de Mexico, Guanajuato, Guerrero, Hidalgo, Jalisco, Mexico State, Michoacan, Oaxaca, Puebla, Queretaro, San Luis Potosi, Zacatecas)
