= Pachycaul =

Plants with thick trunks and few branches

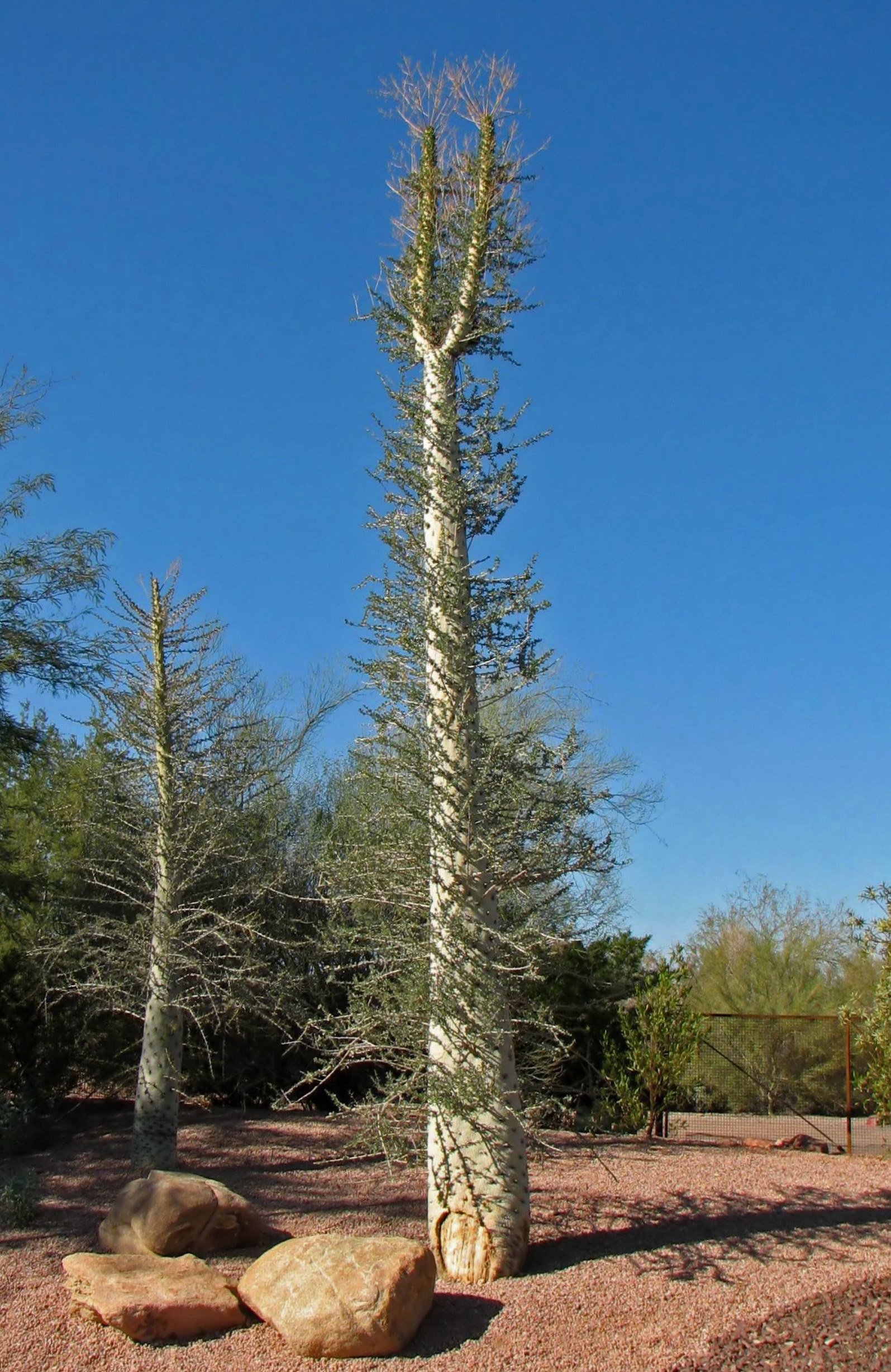
Fouquieria columnaris

Pachycauls are plants with a disproportionately thick trunk, for their height, and relatively few branches. With certain pachycaul species, particularly the more succulent varieties, they are commonly referred to as "caudiciformes", a reference to their trunk development of a moisture-filled caudex for periods of drought. By comparison, trees with thin twigs, such as oaks (Quercus), maples (Acer) and Eucalyptus, are called leptocauls; those with moderately thick twigs, such as Plumeria, are called mesocauls. Pachycauls can be the product of exceptional primary growth (as with Arecaceae and Cycadaceae) or disproportionate secondary growth, as with the baobabs (Adansonia). The word is derived from the Greek pachy- (meaning "thick" or "stout") and the Latin caulis (meaning "stem").

All of the arboreal (treelike) species of Cactaceae are pachycauls, as are most of the Arecaceae, Cycadaceae and Pandanus. The most extreme pachycauls are the floodplains, or river-bottom, varieties of the African palmyra (Borassus aethiopum), with primary growth up to 2.1 m (6 ft 11 in) thick, and the Coquito palm (Jubaea chilensis), with its primary growth measuring up to 1.8 m (5 ft 11 in) thick. The most pachycaulous cycad is Cycas thouarsii at up to 150 cm (59 in) diameter. The tallest pachycaul is the Andean wax palm (Ceroxylon quindiuense), at heights of up to 66 m (217 ft), and around 41 cm (16 in) in diameter. The most pachycaulous cactus are the barrel cacti (Echinocactus platyacanthus), with primary growth up to 1.3 m (4 ft 3 in) diameter. The largest caudiciforme-type pachycaul is the African baobab (Adansonia digitata); one specimen of which, called the Glencoe baobab (from Hoedspruit, Limpopo, South Africa) has a basal diameter (not girth) of 16 m (52 ft). However, this particular tree has suffered a severe trauma and is dying. Pachycauls also differ greatly in their rates of growth, from the half-man tree (Pachypodium namaquanum) which grows only 5 mm (0.20 in) each year to the palm Pigafetta elata which can grow 2.7 m (8 ft 10 in) or more in one year.

== Genera ==
Examples occur in these genera:

- Pachycormus (Anacardiaceae)
- Acanthocereus (Cactaceae)
- Peniocereus (Cactaceae)
- Alluaudia (Didiereaceae)
- Adenium (Apocynaceae)
- Crassula (Crassulaceae)
- Kalanchoe (Crassulaceae)
- Beaucarnea (Asparagaceae)
- Pachypodium (Apocynaceae)
- Dendrosenecio (Asteraceae)
- Bursera (Burseraceae)
- Cyanea (Campanulaceae)
- Lobelia (Campanulaceae)
- Dendrosicyos (Cucurbitaceae)
- Operculicarya (Anacardiaceae)
- Gerrardanthus (Cucurbitaceae)
- Givotia (Euphorbiaceae)
- Delonix (Fabaceae)
- Fouquieria (Fouquieriaceae)
- Adansonia (Malvaceae; subfamily Bombacoideae)
- Bombax (Malvaceae)
- Brachychiton (Malvaceae)
- Cavanillesia (Malvaceae)
- Ceiba (Malvaceae)
- Dorstenia (Moraceae)
- Stephania (Menispermaceae)
- Cyphostemma (Vitaceae).

== See also ==
- Caudex
