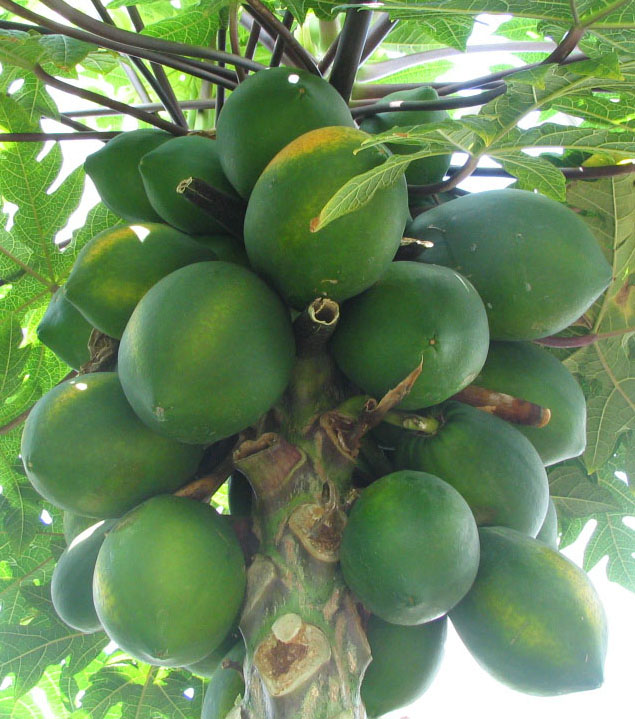
- Carica papaya

Scientific classification
- Kingdom: Plantae
- Clade: Tracheophytes
- Clade: Angiosperms
- Clade: Eudicots
- Clade: Rosids
- Order: Brassicales
- Family: Caricaceae; Dumort.

Genera
- See text

= Caricaceae =

Family of flowering plants

The Caricaceae are a family of flowering plants in the order Brassicales, found primarily in tropical regions of Central and South America and Africa. They are usually short-lived evergreen pachycaul shrubs or small to medium-sized trees growing to 5–10 m tall. One species, Vasconcellea horovitziana is a liana and the three species of the genus Jarilla are herbs. Some species, such as the papaya, bear edible fruit and produce papain.

Based on molecular analyses, this family has been proposed to have originated in Africa in the early Cenozoic era, ~66 million years ago (mya). The dispersal from Africa to Central America occurred ~35 mya, possibly via ocean currents from the Congo delta. From Central America, the family reached South America 19-27 mya.

The family comprises six genera and about 34-35 species:

- Caricaceae
  - - - Carica – three species, Americas
      - - Horovitzia – one species, Mexico
        - Jarilla – four species, Americas
    - - Jacaratia – eight species, Americas
      - Vasconcellea – twenty species, Americas
  - Cylicomorpha – two species, Africa
