= List of carrot diseases =

This is a list of diseases of carrots (Daucus carota subsp. sativus).

== Bacterial diseases ==
Bacterial diseases
Bacterial leaf blight	Xanthomonas campestris
Bacterial soft rot	Erwinia chrysanthemi E. carotovora subsp. carotovora = Pectobacterium carotovorum subsp. carotovorum E. carotovora subsp. atroseptica = Pectobacterium carotovorum subsp. atrosepticum
Carrot bacterial gall	Rhizobacter dauci
Carrot bacteriosis	Xanthomonas campestris pv. carotae
Crown gall	Agrobacterium tumefaciens
Hairy root	Agrobacterium rhizogenes
Scab	Streptomyces scabiei

== Fungal diseases ==
Fungal diseases
Alternaria leaf blight	Alternaria dauci
Black root rot	Thielaviopsis basicola Chalara elegans [synanamorph]
Black rot (black carrot root dieback)	Alternaria radicina = Stemphylium radicinum
Blue mold rot (blue green mold)	Penicillium expansum
Brown rot (Phoma disease)	Leptosphaeria libanotis Phoma rostrupii [anamorph]
Buckshot rot	Typhula spp.
Canker	Thanatephorus cucumeris Rhizoctonia solani [anamorph]
Cavity spot	Pythium spp. Pythium violae Rhizoctonia spp. Rhizoctonia solani
Cercospora leaf spot	Cercospora carotae
Cottony rot	Sclerotinia minor Sclerotinia sclerotiorum
Crater rot	Athelia arachnoidea (anamorph = Fibulorhizoctonia carotae)
Crown rot	Rhizoctonia spp. Rhizoctonia solani
Damping off	Fusarium spp. Pythium spp. Rhizoctonia solani
Dieback of carrots	Pythium spp. Pythium debaryanum
Downy mildew	Plasmopara crustosa = Plasmopara nivea
Forking, brown root	Pythium spp. Pythium irregulare Pythium paroecandrum Pythium sylvaticum
Fusarium dry rot	Fusarium sp.
Gray mold rot	Botryotinia fuckeliana Botrytis cinerea [anamorph]
Hard rot	Fusarium sp. Gliocladium roseum
Lateral root dieback	Pythium spp.
Leaf rot	Typhula variabilis
Leaf spot	Ramularia spp.
Licorice rot	Mycocentrospora acerina = Centrospora acerina Sclerotinia sclerotiorum Thielaviopsis basicola Typhula spp.
Phytophthora root rot	Phytophthora megasperma
Pink mold rot	Trichothecium roseum
Powdery mildew	Erysiphe heraclei Erysiphe polygoni Erysiphe umbelliferarum f. dauci
Pythium brown rot and forking	Pythium irregulare Pythium paroecandrum Pythium sulcatum Pythium sylvaticum
Pythium root dieback	Pythium spp.
Rhizoctonia canker	Rhizoctonia solani
Rhizoctonia seedling disease	Rhizoctonia spp.
Rhizopus wooly soft rot	Rhizopus arrhizus = Rhizopus oryzae Rhizopus stolonifer = Rhizopus nigricans
Root canker	Rhizoctonia spp.
Root dieback	Pythium spp.
Root rot	Fusarium spp. Fusarium culmorum Rhizoctonia spp. Sclerotium rolfsii
Phymatotrichum root rot (cotton root rot)	Phymatotrichopsis omnivora = Phymatotrichum omnivorum
Rubbery brown rot	Phytophthora cactorum P. megasperma
Rubbery slate rot	Pythium debaryanum
Rust	Aecidium foeniculi Uromyces graminis Uromyces lineolatus subsp. nearcticus = Uromyces scirpi
Rusty root	Pythium spp. Olpidium brassicae, as vector, tobacco necrosis virus
Sclerotinia rot	Sclerotinia sclerotiorum Sclerotinia minor
Seed mold	Alternaria alternata Gibberella fujikuroi Fusarium moniliforme [anamorph]
Sooty rot	Aspergillus niger
Sour rot	Geotrichum candidum
Southern blight	Athelia rolfsii Sclerotium rolfsii [anamorph]
Stem spot	Diaporthe arctii
Tip rot	Numerous pathogens
Umbel blight	Colletotrichum gloeosporioides
Violet root rot	Helicobasidium brebissonii = Helicobasidium purpureum Rhizoctonia crocorum [anamorph]
Watery soft rot	Sclerotinia minor Sclerotinia sclerotiorum Sclerotium rolfsii Botrytis cinerea

== Nematodes, parasitic ==
Nematodes, parasitic
Cyst nematode	Heterodera carotae
Dagger nematode	Xiphinema
Lance nematode	Hoplolaimus uniformis
Lesion nematode	Pratylenchus penetrans Pratylenchus spp.
Root knot	Meloidogyne hapla
Sting nematode	Belonolaimus longicaudatus
Stubby-root nematodes	Trichodorus

== Virus and viroid diseases ==
diseases
Alfalfa mosaic	genus Alfamovirus, Alfalfa mosaic virus (AMV)
Carrot latent	genus Nucleorhabdovirus, Carrot latent virus (CtLtV)
Carrot mottle	genus Umbravirus, Carrot mottle virus (CMoV)
Carrot red leaf	genus Luteovirus, Carrot red leaf virus (CaRLV)
Carrot thin leaf	genus Potyvirus, Carrot thin leaf virus (CTLV)
Carrot yellow leaf	Carrot yellow leaf virus (CYLV)
Celery mosaic	genus Potyvirus, Celery mosaic virus (CeMV)
Cucumber mosaic	genus Cucumovirus, Cucumber mosaic virus (CMV)
Curly top	genus Hybrigeminivirus, Beet curly top virus (BCTV)
Motley dwarf	genus Luteovirus, Carrot red leaf virus (CaRLV) genus Umbravirus, Carrot mottle virus (CMoV)

== Phytoplasmal and spiroplasmal diseases ==
Phytoplasmal and spiroplasmal diseases
Aster yellows	Aster yellows phytoplasma

== Miscellaneous diseases and disorders ==
Miscellaneous diseases and disorders
Crown rot disorder	No specific pathogen associated with this disorder
Heat canker	High soil surface temperature
Hollow black heart	Boron deficiency
Ozone injury	Ozone pollution
Root scab	Physiological
Speckled carrot	No pathogen; genetic disorder
