= List of spinach diseases =

This article is a list of diseases of spinach (Spinacia oleracea).

== Bacterial diseases ==
Bacterial diseases
Bacterial leaf spot	Pseudomonas syringae pv. spinacea
Bacterial soft rot	Erwinia carotovora
Witches’-broom	Rickettsia-like organism

== Fungal and Oomycete diseases ==
Fungal diseases
Anthracnose	Colletotrichum dematium = Colletotrichum spinaciae
Aphanomyces root rot	Aphanomyces cochlioides Aphanomyces cladogamus
Cercospora leaf spot	Cercospora beticola
Damping-off	Pythium aphanidermatum Pythium irregulare Pythium ultimum Rhizoctonia solani Thanatephorus cucumeris [teleomorph]
Downy mildew = blue mold	Peronospora effusa
Fusarium wilt	Fusarium oxysporum f.sp. spinacia
Leaf spot	Alternaria spp. Ascochyta spinaciae Cercospora spp. Cladosporium spp. Myrothecium spp. Phyllosticta spp. Ramularia spinaciae Other fungi
Phoma blight	Phoma nebulosa
Phytophthora root rot	Phytophthora cryptogea Phytophthora megasperma
Pythium root rot	Pythium aphanidermatum Pythium heterothallicum Pythium sylvaticum
Red rust	Puccinia aristidae Aecidium caspicum [anamorph]
Seed mold	Alternaria spp. Curvularia spp. Other fungi
White rust	Albugo occidentalis
White smut	Entyloma ellisii

== Nematodes, parasitic ==
Nematodes, parasitic
Beet cyst nematode	Heterodera schachtii
Clover cyst nematode	Heterodera trifolii
Root knot	Meloidogyne spp.
Root lesion	Pratylenchus spp.

== Viral diseases ==
Viral diseases
Curly top	genus Hybrigeminivirus, Beet curly top virus (BCTV)
Speckles	genus Luteovirus, Beet western yellows virus (BWYV) genus Umbravirus, Lettuce speckles mottle virus (LSMV)
Spinach blight	genus Fabavirus, Broad bean wilt virus (BBWV) genus Cucumovirus, Cucumber mosaic virus (CMV); Other viruses
Spinach mosaic	genus Potyvirus, Beet mosaic virus (BtMV) genus Tobamovirus, Tobacco mosaic virus (TMV); Other viruses
Yellow dwarf	Unidentified virus
Yellows	genus Luteovirus, Beet western yellows virus (BWYV) genus Cucumovirus, Cucumber mosaic virus (CMV) genus Tospovirus, Tomato spotted wilt virus (TSWV) genus Potyvirus, Turnip mosaic virus (TuMV)

== Phytoplasmal diseases ==
Phytoplasmal diseases
Aster yellows	Phytoplasma

== Miscellaneous diseases and disorders ==
Miscellaneous diseases and disorders
Heart-leaf disorder	Low light, wide diurnal air temperature fluctuations, low soil temperatures
Leaf necrosis and scorch	Ozone and other air pollutants
Tip burn	Unknown
Yellows	Nutritional disorders
