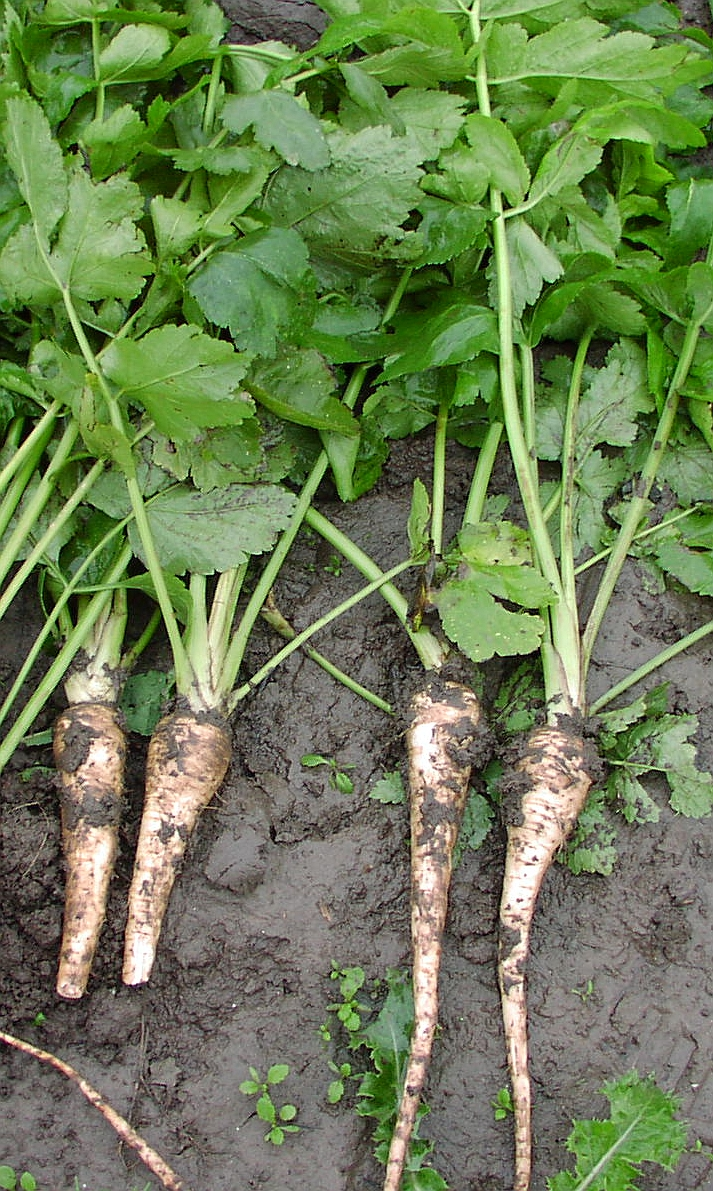

Scientific classification
- Kingdom: Plantae
- Clade: Tracheophytes
- Clade: Angiosperms
- Clade: Eudicots
- Clade: Asterids
- Order: Apiales
- Family: Apiaceae
- Genus: Pastinaca
- Species: P. sativa

Binomial name
- Pastinaca sativa L.

= Parsnip =

Root vegetable related to carrot and parsley

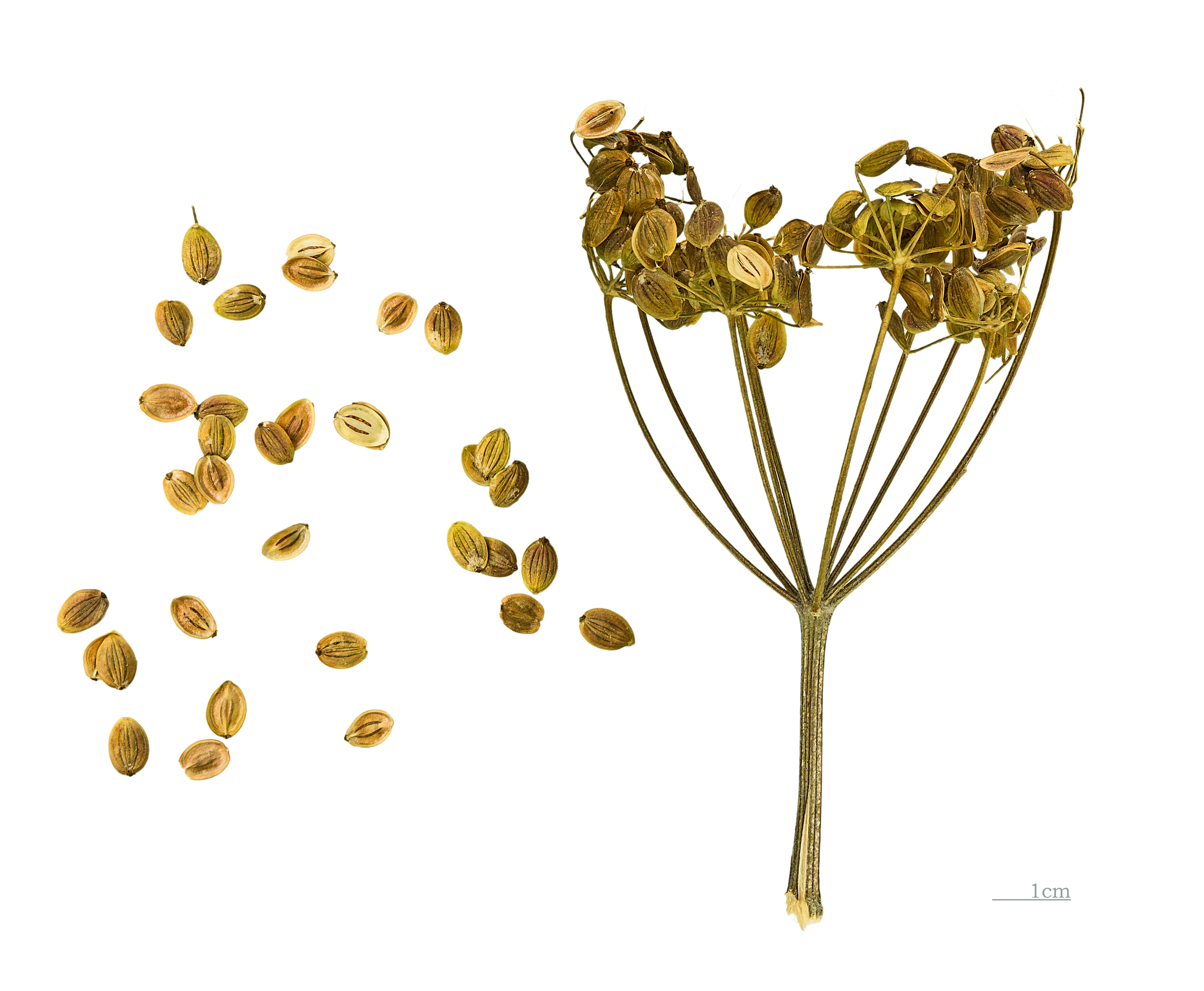
Pastinaca sativa fruits and seeds

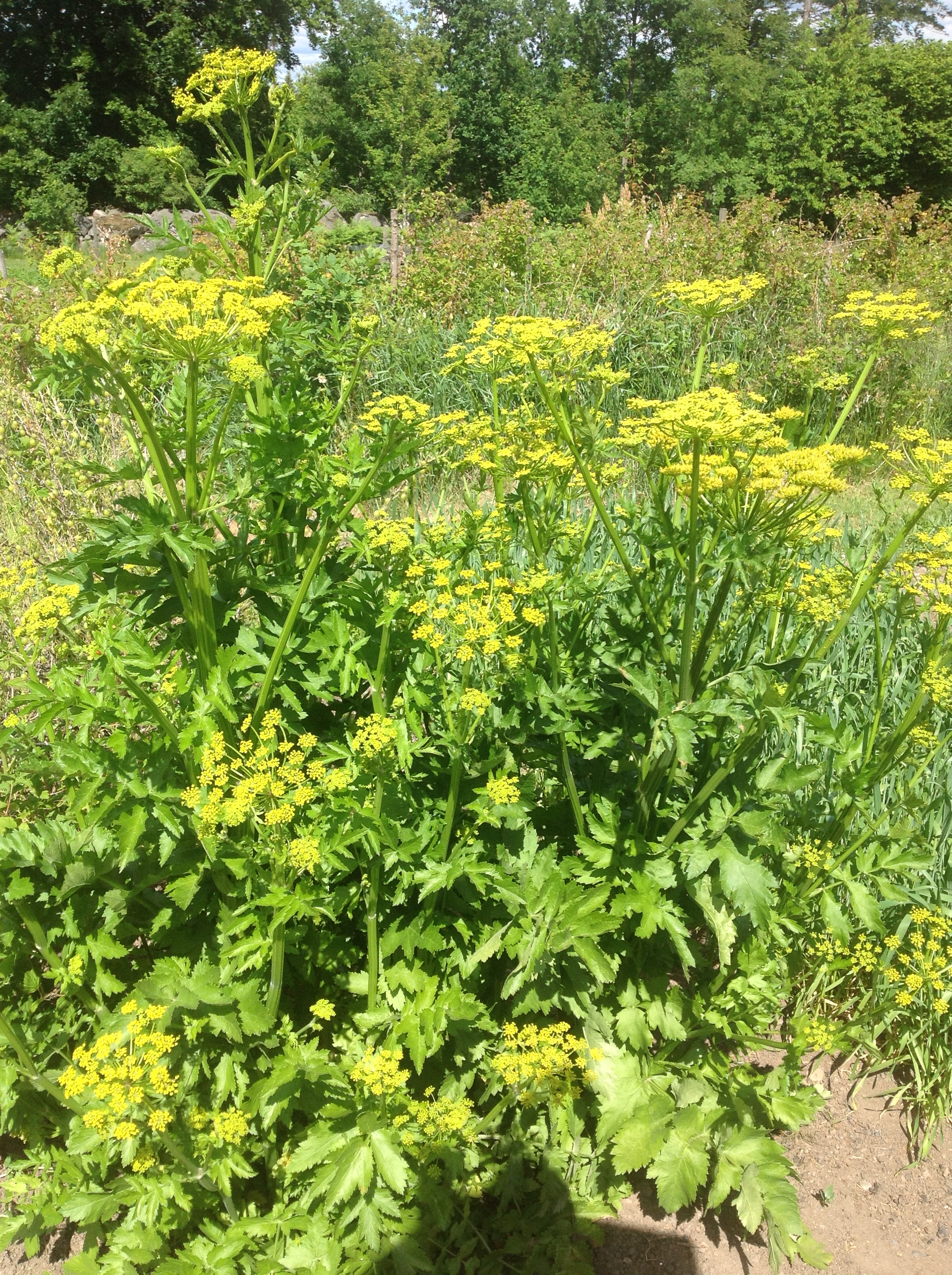
Parsnip in its second year, flowering

The parsnip (Pastinaca sativa) is a root vegetable closely related to carrot and parsley, all belonging to the flowering plant family Apiaceae. It is a biennial plant usually grown as an annual. Its long taproot has light cream colored skin and flesh, and, left in the ground to mature, becomes sweeter in flavor after winter frosts. In its first growing season, the plant has a rosette of pinnate, mid-green leaves. If unharvested, it produces a flowering stem topped by an umbel of small yellow flowers in its second growing season, later producing pale brown, flat, winged seeds. By this time, the stem has become woody, and the taproot inedible.

The parsnip is native to Eurasia; it has been used as a vegetable since antiquity and was cultivated by the Romans, although some confusion exists between parsnips and carrots in the literature of the time. It was used as a sweetener before the arrival of cane sugar in Europe. Introduced to the Americas by European settlers, it has become a common weed in North America. All who may come upon it in the wild should exercise caution, for all its parts contain furanocoumarins that can sensitize mammalian tissue to sunlight and so cause photodermatitis in the form of a skin rash or even blisters; its contact with the eyes can potentially blind them.

Parsnips are usually cooked, but they can also be eaten raw. Their flesh is sweet, even sweeter than carrots. They contain vitamins, antioxidants, minerals, especially potassium, and both soluble and insoluble dietary fiber. Parsnips grow best in deep, stone-free soil. The plants are susceptible to carrot flies and other insect pests, as well as viruses and fungal diseases. Canker is the most serious of these diseases.

== Description ==
The parsnip is a biennial plant with a rosette of roughly hairy leaves that have a pungent odor when crushed. Parsnips are grown for their fleshy, edible, cream-colored taproots. The roots are generally smooth, although lateral roots sometimes form. Most are narrowly conical, but some cultivars have a more bulbous shape, which generally tends to be favored by food processors as it is more resistant to breakage. The plant's apical meristem produces a rosette of pinnate leaves, each with several pairs of leaflets with toothed margins. The lower leaves have short stems, the upper ones are stemless, and the terminal leaves have three lobes. The leaves are once- or twice-pinnate with broad, ovate, sometimes lobed leaflets with toothed margins; they grow up to 40 centimetres (16 inches) long. The petioles are grooved and have sheathed bases. The floral stem develops in the second year and can grow to more than 150 cm (60 in) tall. It is hairy, grooved, hollow (except at the nodes), and sparsely branched. It has a few stalkless, single-lobed leaves measuring 5 to 10 cm (2 to 4 in) long that are arranged in opposite pairs.

The yellow flowers are in a loose, compound umbel measuring 10 to 20 cm (4 to 8 in) in diameter. Six to 25 straight pedicels are present, each measuring 2 to 5 cm (1 to 2 in) that support the umbellets (secondary umbels). The umbels and umbellets usually have no upper or lower bracts. The flowers have tiny sepals or lack them entirely, and measure about 3.5 millimetres (1/8 in). They consist of five yellow petals that are curled inward, five stamens, and one pistil. The fruits, or schizocarps, are oval and flat, with narrow wings and short, spreading styles. They are colored straw to light brown, and measure 4 to 8 mm (3/16 to 5/16 in) long.

Despite the slight morphological differences between the two, wild parsnip is the same taxon as the cultivated version, and the two readily cross-pollinate. The parsnip has a chromosome number of 2n=22.

== Taxonomy ==
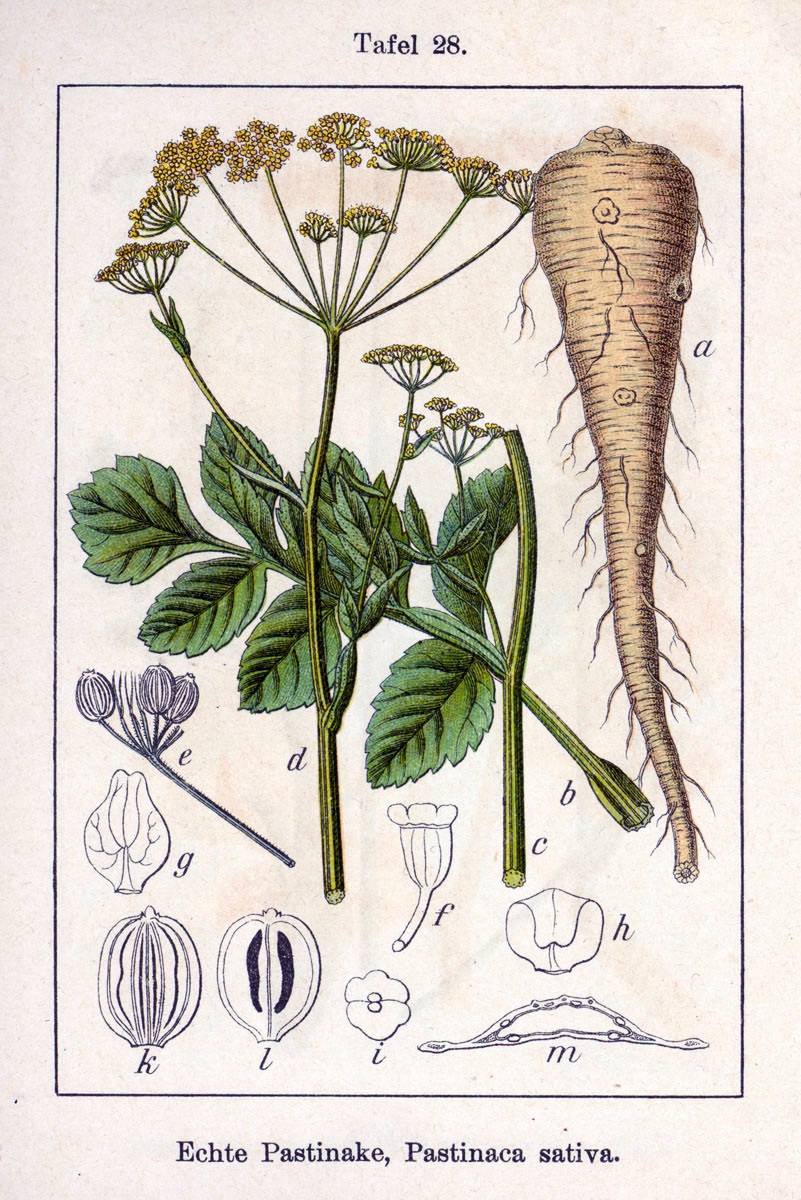
Illustration from Johann Georg Sturm's 1796 Deutschlands Flora in Abbildungen

Pastinaca sativa was first officially described by Carolus Linnaeus in his 1753 work Species Plantarum. It has acquired several synonyms in its taxonomic history:

- Pastinaca fleischmannii Hladnik, ex D.Dietr.
- Pastinaca opaca Bernh. ex Hornem.
- Pastinaca pratensis (Pers.) H.Mart.
- Pastinaca sylvestris Mill.
- Pastinaca teretiuscula Boiss.
- Pastinaca umbrosa Steven, ex DC.
- Pastinaca urens Req. ex Godr.

Several species from other genera (Anethum, Elaphoboscum, Peucedanum, Selinum) are likewise synonymous with the name Pastinaca sativa.

Like most plants of agricultural importance, several subspecies and varieties of P. sativa have been described, but these are mostly no longer recognized as independent taxa, but rather, morphological variations of the same taxon.

- Pastinaca sativa subsp. divaricata (Desf.) Rouy & Camus
- Pastinaca sativa subsp. pratensis (Pers.) Čelak.
- Pastinaca sativa subsp. sylvestris (Mill.) Rouy & Camus
- Pastinaca sativa subsp. umbrosa (Steven, ex DC.) Bondar. ex O.N.Korovina
- Pastinaca sativa subsp. urens (Req. ex Godr.) Čelak.
- Pastinaca sativa var. brevis Alef.
- Pastinaca sativa var. edulis DC.
- Pastinaca sativa var. hortensis Ehrh. ex Hoffm.
- Pastinaca sativa var. longa Alef.
- Pastinaca sativa var. pratensis Pers.
- Pastinaca sativa var. siamensis Roem. & Schult. ex Alef.

In Eurasia, some authorities distinguish between cultivated and wild versions of parsnips by using subspecies P. s. sylvestris for the latter, or even elevating it to species status as Pastinaca sylvestris. In Europe, various subspecies have been named based on characteristics such as the hairiness of the leaves, the extent to which the stems are angled or rounded, and the size and shape of the terminal umbel.

=== Etymology ===
The etymology of the generic name Pastinaca (Latin for parsnips and carrots) is not known with certainty but is probably derived from either the Latin word pastino, meaning 'to prepare the ground for planting of the vine' or pastus, meaning 'food'. The specific epithet sativa literally means 'sown' or 'planted', but is used in botanical nomenclature to mean 'cultivated'.

While folk etymology sometimes assumes the name is a mix of parsley and turnip, it actually comes from Middle English pasnepe, alteration (influenced by nep, 'turnip') of Old French pasnaie (now panais) from Latin pastinum, a kind of fork. The word's ending was changed to -nip by analogy with turnip because it was mistakenly assumed to be a kind of turnip.

== Distribution and habitat ==
Like carrots, parsnips are native to Eurasia.

== Invasivity ==
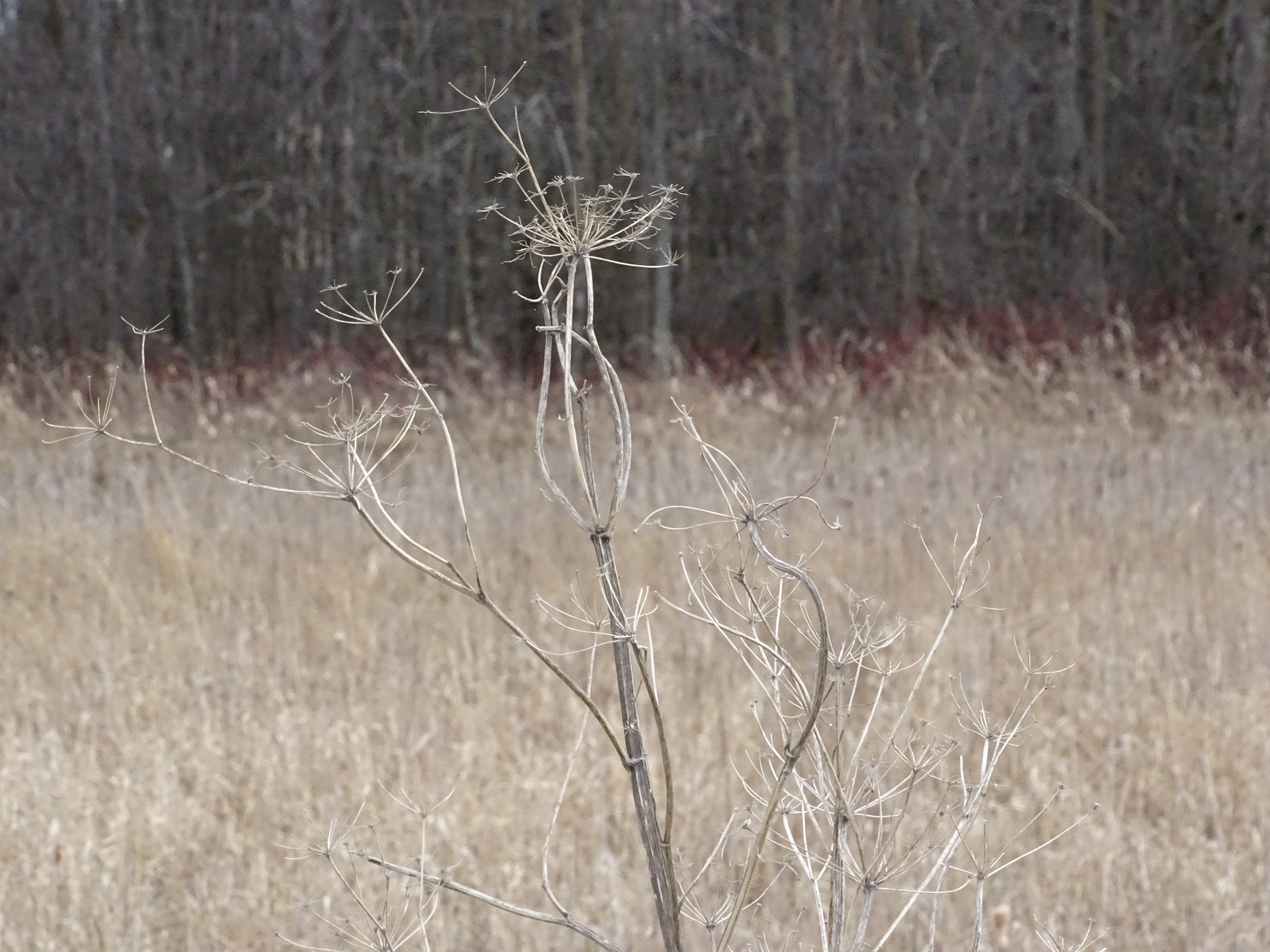
Previous-year growth of wild parsnip as seen in the spring. Invasive specimen photographed in Ottawa, Ontario.

The parsnip's popularity as a cultivated plant has led to its spread beyond its native range, and wild populations have become established in other parts of the world. A scattered population can be found throughout North America.

The plant can form dense stands which outcompete native species and is especially common in abandoned yards, farmland, and along roadsides and other disturbed environments. The increasing abundance of this plant is a concern, particularly due to the plant's toxicity and increasing abundance in populated areas such as parks. Control is often carried out via chemical means, with glyphosate-containing herbicides considered effective.

== Cultivation ==
=== History ===
Zohary and Hopf note that the archaeological evidence for the ancient cultivation of the parsnip is "still rather limited" and that Greek and Roman literary sources are a major source about its early use. They warn that "there are some difficulties in distinguishing between parsnip and carrot (which, in Roman times, were white or purple) in classical writings since both vegetables seem to have been called pastinaca in Latin, yet each vegetable appears to be well under cultivation in Roman times".

This plant was introduced to North America simultaneously by the French colonists in Canada and the British in the Thirteen Colonies for use as a root vegetable, but in the mid-19th century, it was replaced as the main source of starch by the potato and consequently was less widely cultivated.

In 1859, a new cultivar called 'Student' was developed by James Buckman at the Royal Agricultural College in England. He back-crossed cultivated plants to wild stock, aiming to demonstrate how native plants could be improved by selective breeding. This experiment was so successful 'Student' became the major variety in cultivation in the late 19th century.

=== Propagation ===
The wild parsnip from which the modern cultivated varieties were derived is a plant of dry, rough grassland and waste places, particularly on chalk and limestone soils. Parsnips are biennials, but are normally grown as annuals. Sandy and loamy soils are preferable to silt, clay, and stony ground; the latter produces short, forked roots. Parsnip seed significantly deteriorates in viability if stored for long. Seeds are usually planted in early spring, as soon as the ground can be worked to a fine tilth, in the position where the plants are to grow. The growing plants are thinned and kept weed-free. Harvesting begins in late fall after the first frost and continues through winter. The rows can be covered with straw to enable the crop to be lifted during frosty weather. Low soil temperatures cause some of the starches stored in the roots to be converted into sugars, giving them a sweeter taste.

=== Problems ===
Parsnip leaves are sometimes tunnelled by the larvae of the celery fly (Euleia heraclei). Irregular, pale brown passages can be seen between the upper and lower surfaces of the leaves. The effects are most serious on young plants, as whole leaves may shrivel and die. Treatment is by removing affected leaflets, whole leaves, or by chemical means.

The crop can be attacked by larvae of the carrot fly (Chamaepsila rosae). This pest feeds on the outer layers of the root, burrowing its way inside later in the season. Seedlings may be killed while larger roots are spoiled. The damage done provides a point of entry for fungal rots and canker. The smell of bruised tissue attracts the fly.

Parsnip is used as a food plant by the larvae of some lepidopteran species, including the parsnip swallowtail (Papilio polyxenes), the common swift moth (Korscheltellus lupulina), the garden dart moth (Euxoa nigricans), and the ghost moth (Hepialus humuli). The larvae of the parsnip moth (Depressaria radiella), native to Europe and accidentally introduced to North America in the mid-1800s, construct their webs on the umbels, feeding on flowers and partially developed seeds.

Parsnip canker is a serious disease of this crop. Black or orange-brown patches occur around the root's crown and shoulders, accompanied by cracking and hardening of the flesh. It is more likely to occur when the seed is sown into cold, wet soil, the pH of the soil is too low, or the roots have already been damaged by carrot fly larvae. Several fungi are associated with canker, including Phoma complanata, Ilyonectria radicicola, Itersonilia pastinaceae, and I. perplexans. In Europe, Mycocentrospora acerina has been found to cause a black rot that kills the plant early. Watery soft rot, caused by Sclerotinia minor and S. sclerotiorum, causes the taproot to become soft and watery. A white or buff-coloured mould grows on the surface. The pathogen is most common in temperate and subtropical regions with a cool, wet season.

Violet root rot caused by the fungus Helicobasidium purpureum sometimes affects the roots, covering them with a purplish mat to which soil particles adhere. The leaves become distorted and discoloured, and the mycelium can spread through the soil between plants. Some weeds can harbour this fungus, and it is more prevalent in wet, acid conditions. Erysiphe heraclei causes a powdery mildew that can cause significant crop loss. Infestation by this causes results in the yellowing of the leaf and loss of foliage. Moderate temperatures and high humidity favor the development of the disease.

Several viruses are known to infect the plant, including seed-borne strawberry latent ringspot virus, parsnip yellow fleck virus, parsnip leaf curl virus, parsnip mosaic potyvirus, and potyvirus celery mosaic virus. The latter causes clearing or yellowing of the areas of the leaf immediately beside the veins, the appearance of ochre mosaic spots, and the crinkling of the leaves in infected plants.

== Toxicity ==
The shoots and leaves of parsnip must be handled with care, as its sap contains furanocoumarins, phototoxic chemicals that cause blisters on the skin when it is exposed to sunlight, a condition known as phytophotodermatitis. It shares this property with many of its relatives in the carrot family. Symptoms include redness, burning, and blisters; afflicted areas can remain sensitive and discolored for up to two years. Reports of gardeners experiencing toxic symptoms after coming into contact with foliage have been made, but these have been small compared to the number of people who grow the crop. The problem is most likely to occur on a sunny day when gathering foliage or pulling up old plants that have gone to seed. The symptoms have mostly been mild to moderate. Risk can be reduced by wearing long pants and sleeves to avoid exposure, and avoiding sunlight after any suspected exposure.

If eyes are exposed to the sap it can cause blindness.

The toxic properties of parsnip extracts are resistant to heating and periods of storage lasting several months. Toxic symptoms can also affect livestock and poultry in parts of their bodies where their skin is exposed. Polyynes can be found in Apiaceae vegetables such as parsnip, and they show cytotoxic activities.

== Uses ==
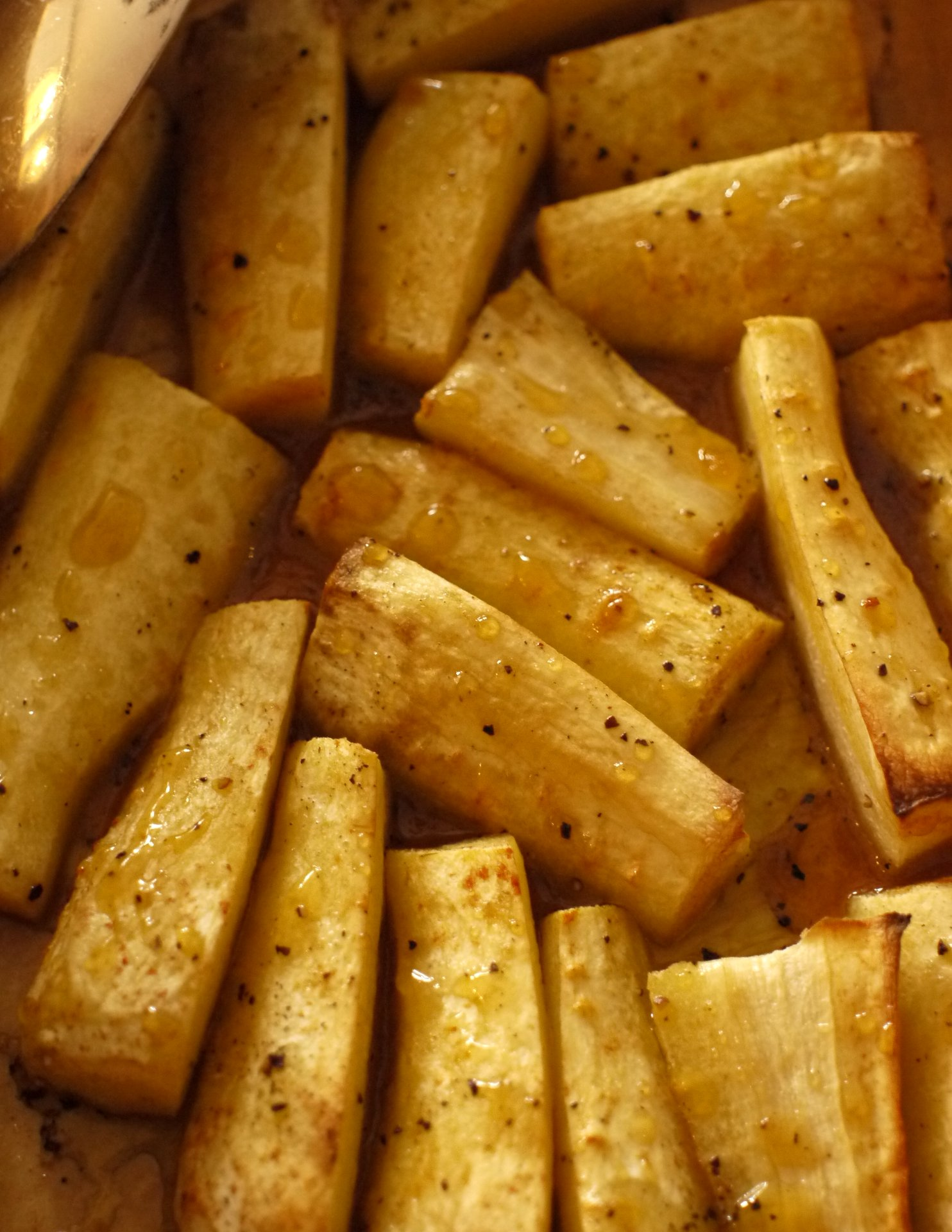
Parsnip prepared with honey and mustard

Parsnips resemble carrots and can be used in similar ways, but they have a sweeter taste, especially when cooked. They can be baked, boiled, pureed, roasted, fried, grilled, or steamed. When used in stews, soups, and casseroles, they give a rich flavour. In some cases, parsnips are boiled, and the solid portions are removed from the soup or stew, leaving behind a more subtle flavour than the whole root and starch to thicken the dish. Roast parsnip is considered an essential part of Christmas dinner in some parts of the English-speaking world and frequently features in the traditional Sunday roast. Parsnips can also be fried or thinly sliced and made into chips. They can be made into a wine with a taste similar to Madeira.

The author Dorothy Hartley described parsnips as having "the type of sweetness that mingles with honey and spice..." The food writer Alan Davidson remarks, "parsnip has a taste which, although not strong, is peculiar and not to everyone's liking."

In Roman times, parsnips were believed to be an aphrodisiac. However, parsnips do not typically feature in modern Italian cooking. Instead, they are fed to pigs, particularly those bred to make Parma ham.

=== Nutrition ===
Parsnip, raw
Nutritional value per 100 g (3.5 oz)
- Energy: 314 kJ (75 kcal)
- Carbohydrates: 18 g
- Sugars: 4.8
- Dietary fiber: 4.9 g
- Fat: 0.2 g
- Protein: 1.2 g
Vitamins and minerals
Vitamins	Quantity %DV^{†}
Thiamine (B1)	8% 0.09 mg
Riboflavin (B2)	4% 0.05 mg
Niacin (B3)	4% 0.7 mg
Pantothenic acid (B5)	12% 0.6 mg
Vitamin B6	5% 0.09 mg
Folate (B9)	17% 67 μg
Vitamin C	19% 17 mg
Vitamin E	10% 1.49 mg
Vitamin K	19% 22.5 μg
Minerals	Quantity %DV^{†}
Calcium	3% 36 mg
Iron	3% 0.59 mg
Magnesium	7% 29 mg
Manganese	24% 0.56 mg
Phosphorus	6% 71 mg
Potassium	13% 375 mg
Sodium	0% 10 mg
Zinc	5% 0.59 mg
- Other constituents: Quantity
- Water: 79.53 g
- Link to USDA Database entry
- ^{†}Percentages estimated using US recommendations for adults, except for potassium, which is estimated based on expert recommendation from the National Academies.

A typical 100 g serving of parsnip provides 314 kilojoules (75 kilocalories) of food energy. Most parsnip cultivars consist of about 80% water, 5% sugar, 1% protein, 0.3% fat, and 5% dietary fiber. The parsnip is rich in vitamins and minerals and is particularly rich in potassium with 375 mg per 100 g. Several of the B-group vitamins are present, but levels of vitamin C are reduced in cooking. Since most of the vitamins and minerals are found close to the skin, many will be lost unless the root is finely peeled or cooked whole. During frosty weather, part of the starch is converted to sugar, and the root tastes sweeter.

The consumption of parsnips has potential health benefits. They contain antioxidants such as falcarinol, falcarindiol, panaxydiol, and methyl-falcarindiol, which may potentially have anticancer, anti-inflammatory and antifungal properties. The dietary fiber in parsnips is partly of the soluble and partly the insoluble type and comprises cellulose, hemicellulose, and lignin. The high fiber content of parsnips may help prevent constipation and reduce blood cholesterol levels.

== In culture ==
The parsnip was much esteemed in Rome, and Emperor Tiberius accepted part of the tribute payable to Rome by Germania in the form of parsnips. In Europe, the vegetable was used as a source of sugar before cane and beet sugars were available. As pastinache comuni, the "common" pastinaca figures in the long list of comestibles enjoyed by the Milanese given by Bonvesin da la Riva in his "Marvels of Milan" (1288).

== See also ==
- Root parsley, a similar-looking vegetable
- Dasyatis pastinaca, the common stingray
