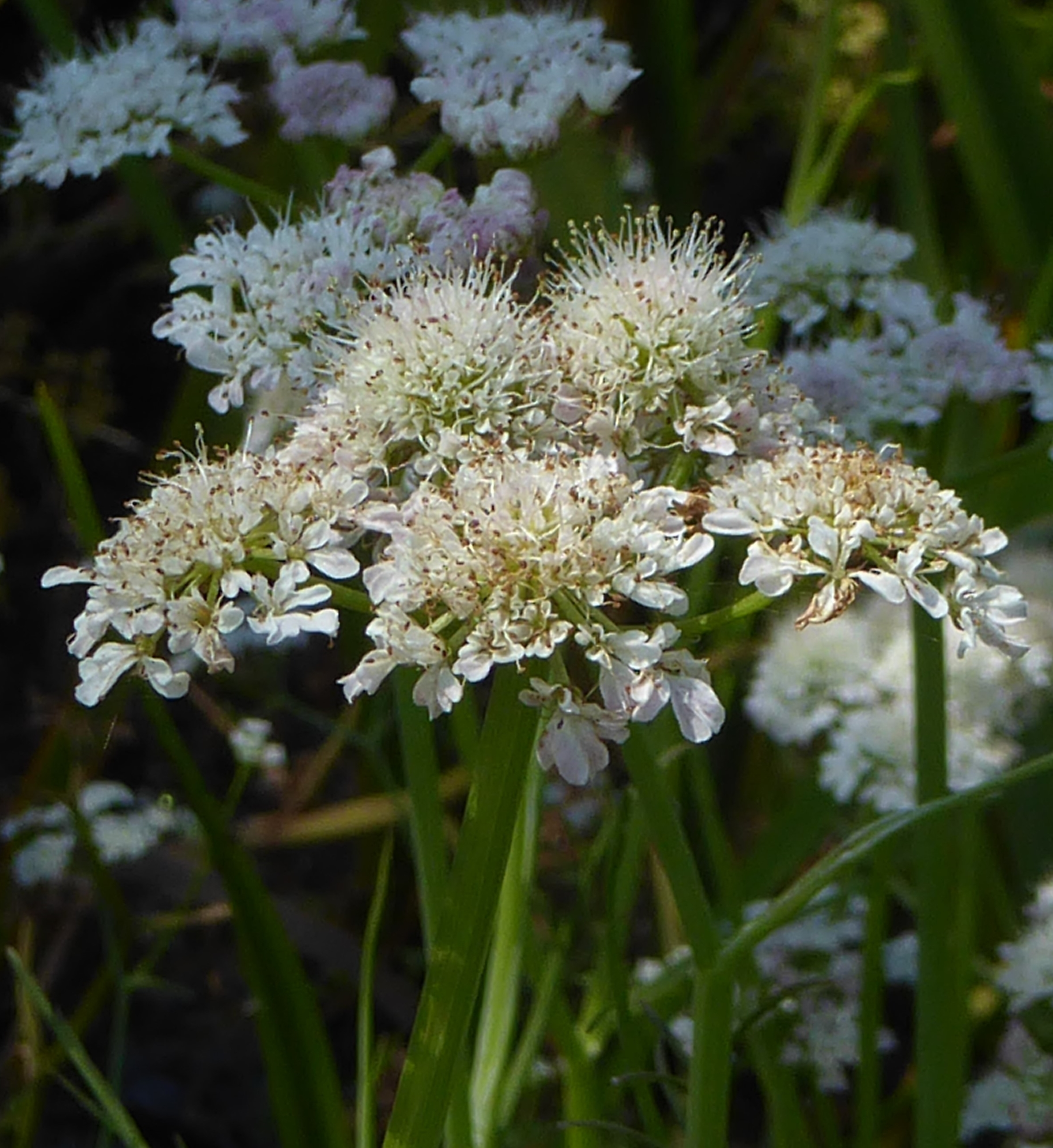

Conservation status
- Least Concern (IUCN 3.1)

Scientific classification
- Kingdom: Plantae
- Clade: Tracheophytes
- Clade: Angiosperms
- Clade: Eudicots
- Clade: Asterids
- Order: Apiales
- Family: Apiaceae
- Genus: Oenanthe
- Species: O. fistulosa

Binomial name
- Oenanthe fistulosa L.

= Oenanthe fistulosa =

Species of flowering plant

Oenanthe fistulosa, tubular water-dropwort, is a flowering plant in the carrot family, native to Europe, North Africa and western parts of Asia. It is an uncommon plant of wetlands, growing around pools and along ditches, mainly in areas of high conservation value.

== Description ==
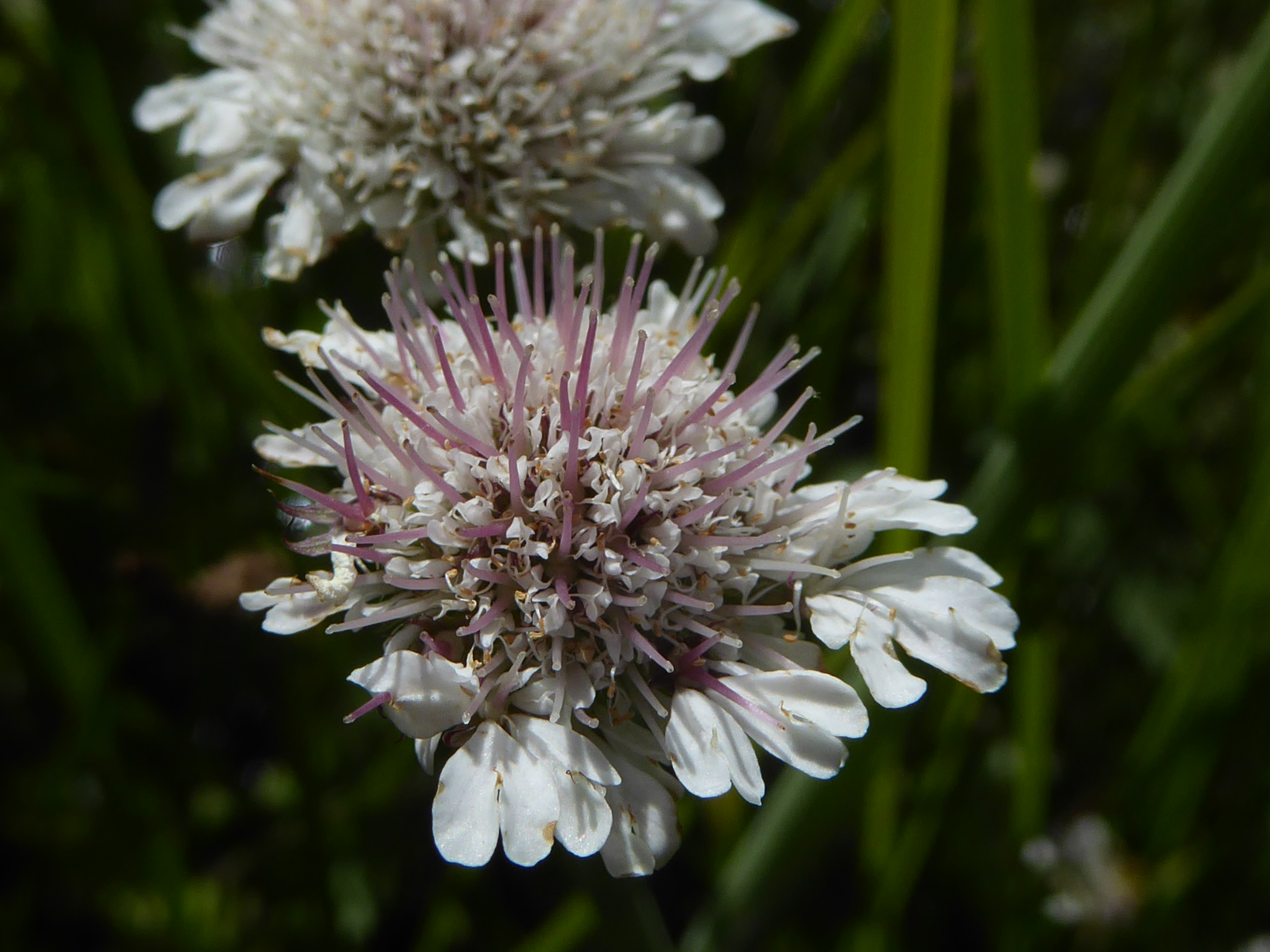
The outermost flowers in each umbel have enlarged "radiating" petals

Tubular water-dropwort is a hairless, stoloniferous perennial growing up to 80 cm tall with brittle, hollow, inflated cylindrical stems 0.5 cm in diameter, which are constricted at the nodes (hence the specific name fistulosa). Unlike some other water-dropworts, it has no swollen tubers among the roots, but it can reproduce vegetatively by the lengthy stolons.

The leaves vary widely in shape, with the upper ones being typically pinnate and having narrow, almost linear segments, while the lower ones can be 2- or even 3-times pinnate, with broader, flat leaflets, more like those of other umbellifers. The leaf stalks of the upper leaves are fistular, like the stem, and longer than the pinnate leaf blade.

It flowers between July and September in northern Europe, with clusters of 2-4 umbels about 1 cm in diameter, each of which has numerous white to pinkish flowers. A distinguishing feature is that, unlike many other umbellifers, it has no bracts but only small bracteoles on the individual umbels. The rays (stalks to the umbels) are 10–30 mm long and become thicker after flowering.

Plants are monoecious, with hermaphroditic and male flowers on the terminal umbels, and only male flowers on the lateral umbels. Each flower has 5 unequal petals with the larger, outer ones radiating, 5 stamens and 2 prominent styles arising from a swollen base (stylopodium) at the top of the ovary. After flowering, the flower stalks and fruits expand to form distinctive pink balls with the remains of the styles projecting in pairs from the surfaces of the cone-shaped fruits.

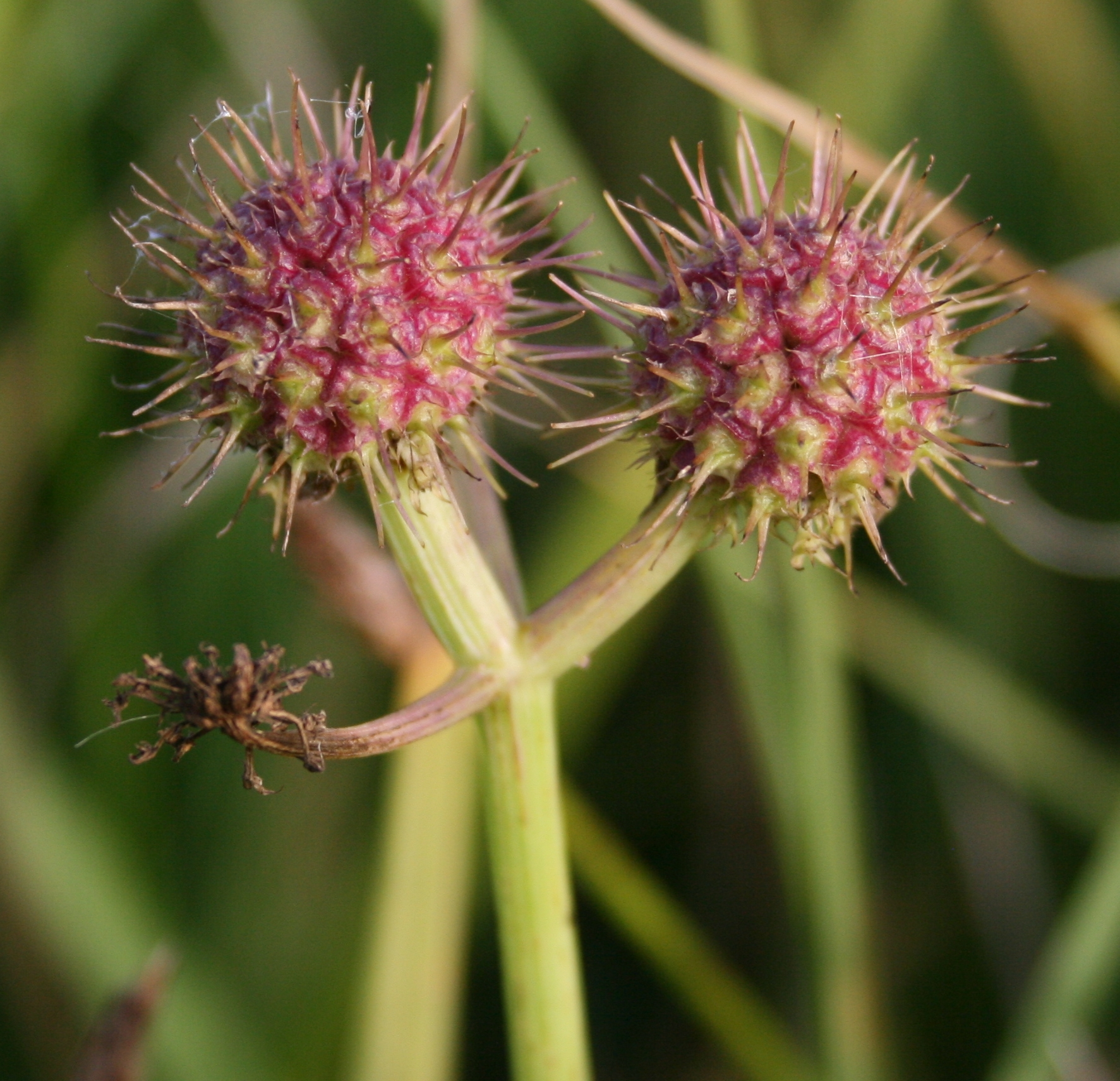
Fruiting umbels; note the lateral umbel with no female flowers

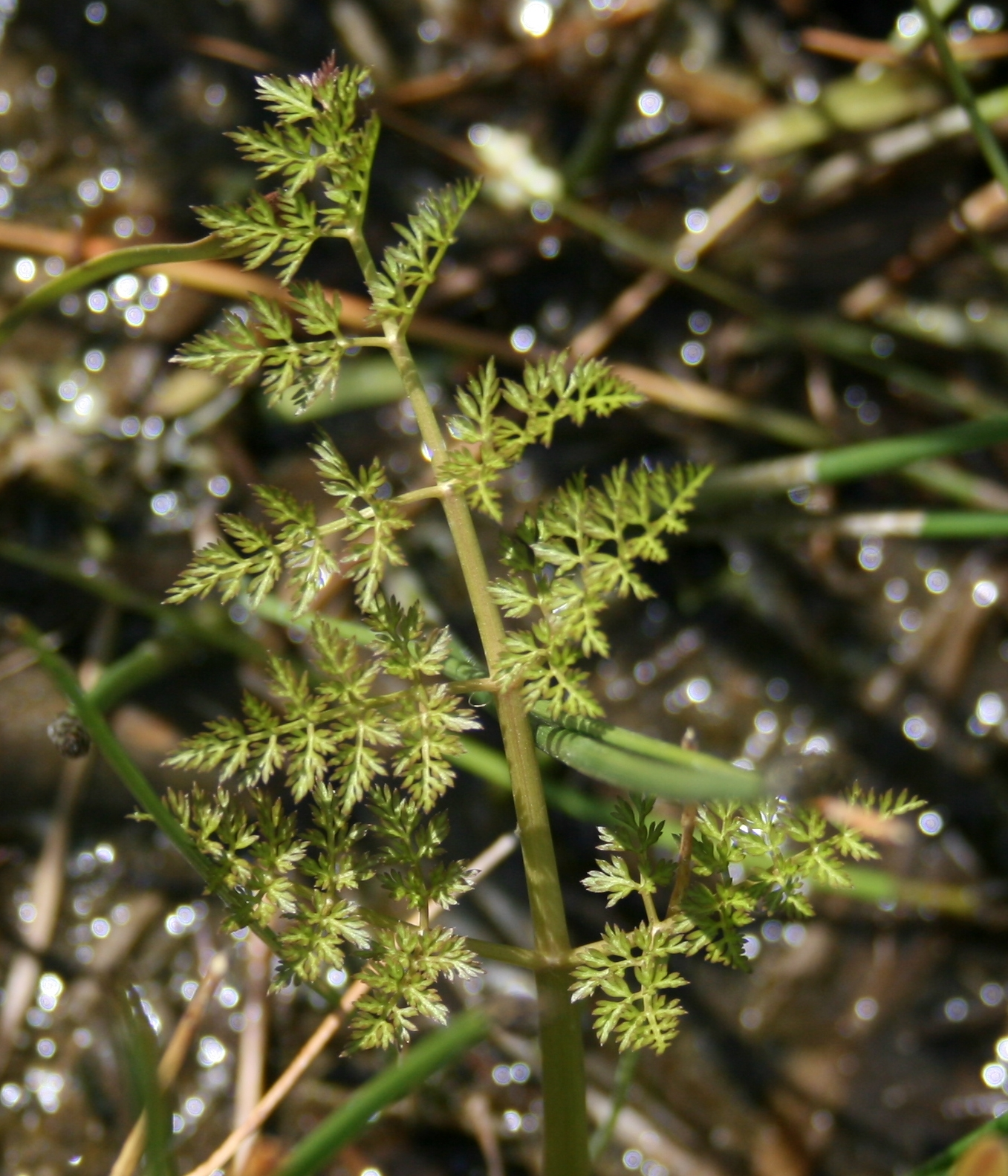
A finely-divided lower leaf

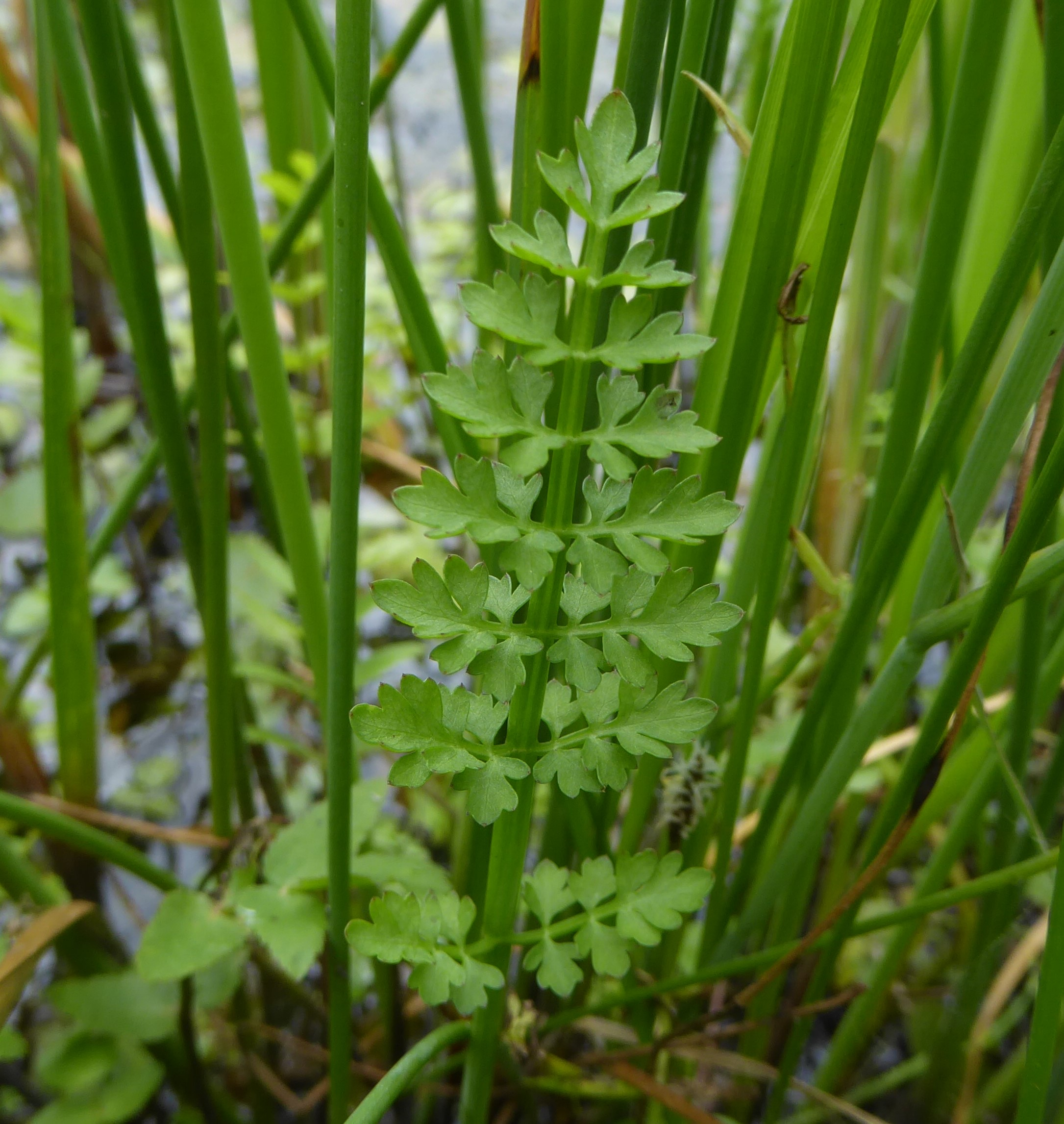
A less finely-divided lower leaf

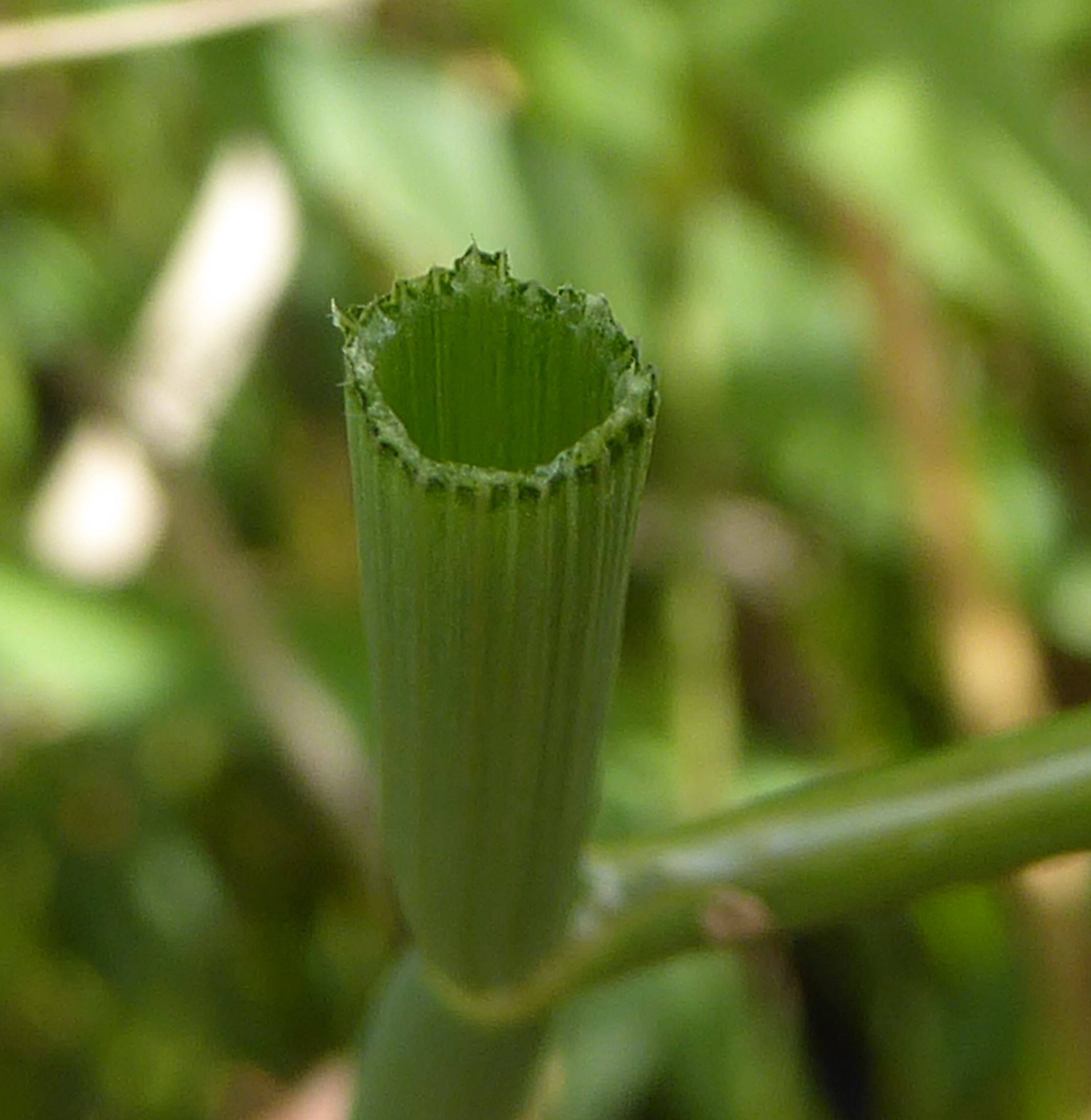
The stems of tubular water-dropwort are hollow, with very thin walls.

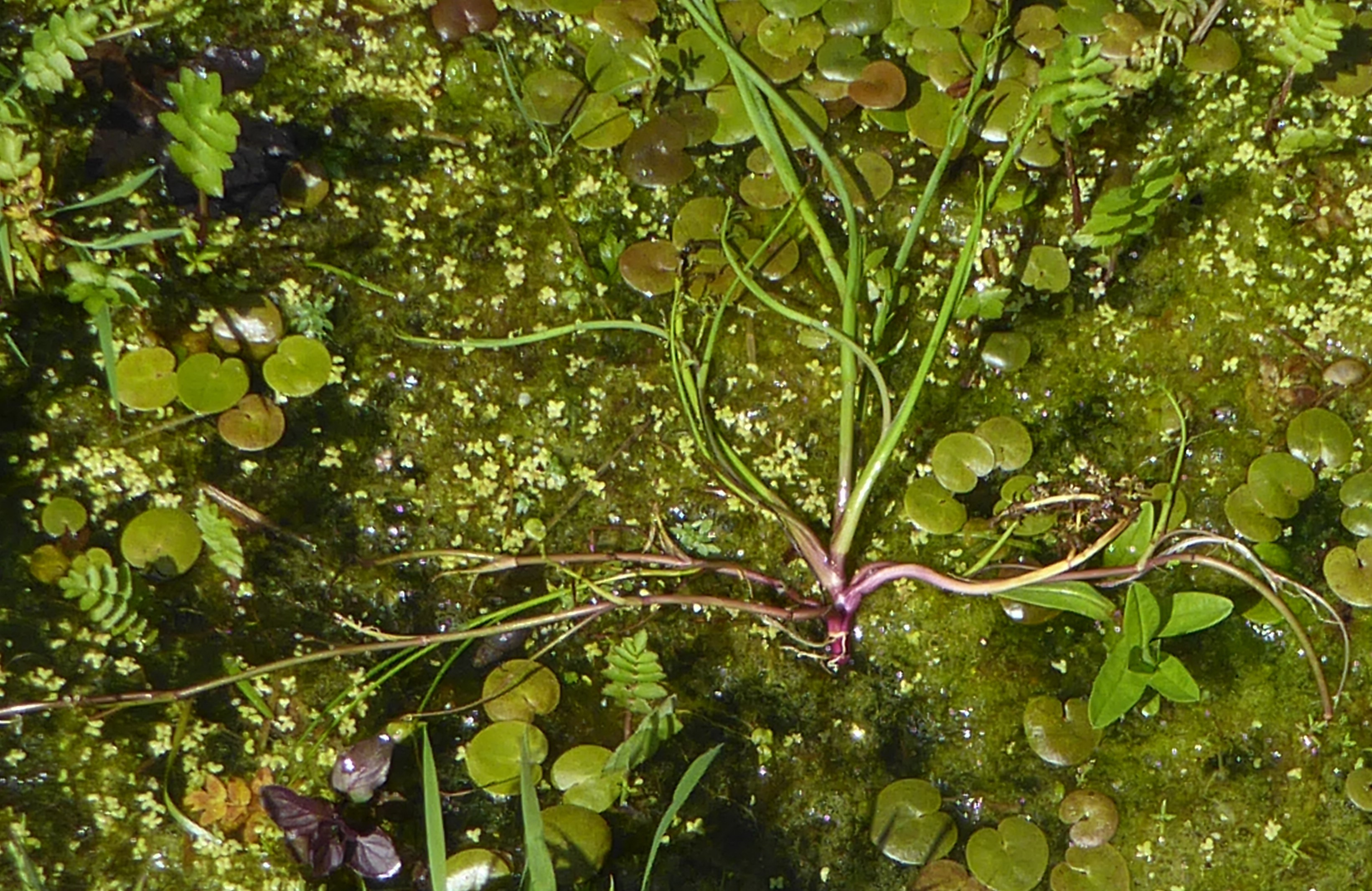
An uprooted plant of tubular water-dropwort, showing the stolons

== Taxonomy ==
The scientific name for tubular water-dropwort was coined by Peter Artedi, who developed the modern binomial classification system, and defined the species on the basis of its involucral characters. It was published after Artedi's death by Linnaeus in Species Plantarum, in 1753, and that name still stands, although numerous others (synonyms) have been proposed over the years, including Phellandrium fistulosum (L.) Clairv. (1811), O. filipendula Dumort. (1827) and Selinum fistulosum (L.) E.H.L. Krause (1904). A full list can be found in the Synonymic Checklists of the Plants of the World.

A few subspecies and variants have been named, such as forma submersa (Glück, 1936), subspecies fistulosa (Linnaeus, 1753) and var. tabernaemontani ((C.C. Gmel.) DC., 1830), but none is in common use now.

There are no reported hybrids.

Its chromosome number is 2n = 22.

The generic name Oenanthe, which comes from the Ancient Greek οίνος, "wine" and άνθος, "flower", was used in ancient times for certain Mediterranean plants and later adopted to describe this genus. "Fistula" is the Latin for tube, and refers to the shape of the stem. The "dropwort" part of the common name is a reference to the tubers produced amongst the roots of certain other species in the genus.

== Identification ==
It can be distinguished from other British species of Oenanthe by its inflated hollow stems (those of lachenalii and pimpinelloides are solid); the absence of bracts (present in crocata, lachenalii and pimpinelloides); the fruit being globose with all fruits sessile (not so with crocata, silaifolia, pimpinelloides or lachenalii); and the fruits being less than 4 mm long (more in crocata and fluviatilis).

== Distribution and status ==
The global range of tubular water-dropwort is from Europe through the northern half of Africa to western parts of Asia. It occurs no further north than southern Scandinavia and is rare as an introduction beyond its natural range. In Britain and Ireland it is found mainly in the lowland eastern counties, becoming increasingly rare towards the uplands of the north and west. In France the pattern is similar, with the main populations in the southern lowlands, becoming rarer towards the upland regions around the Alps.

The IUCN threat status is Least Concern (LC) (as assessed in 2013), both globally and in Europe. In France, it is similarly considered unthreatened nationally, but in some reasons it is declining, notably in Limousin, where it is Critically Rare (CR), and Midi-Pyrénées, where it is Endangered (EN). It is also declining in some other European countries, such as Slovenia, where it is classed as EN.

In Britain it is classified as Vulnerable (VU), while in England it is believed to have declined by 35% in its area of occupancy between the 1960s and the 1990s. This decrease appears to have continued in some English counties, such as Kent, where the number of sites has shrunk by 60% between the 1970s and 2005, despite it being a Biodiversity Action Plan species.

== Habitat and ecology ==
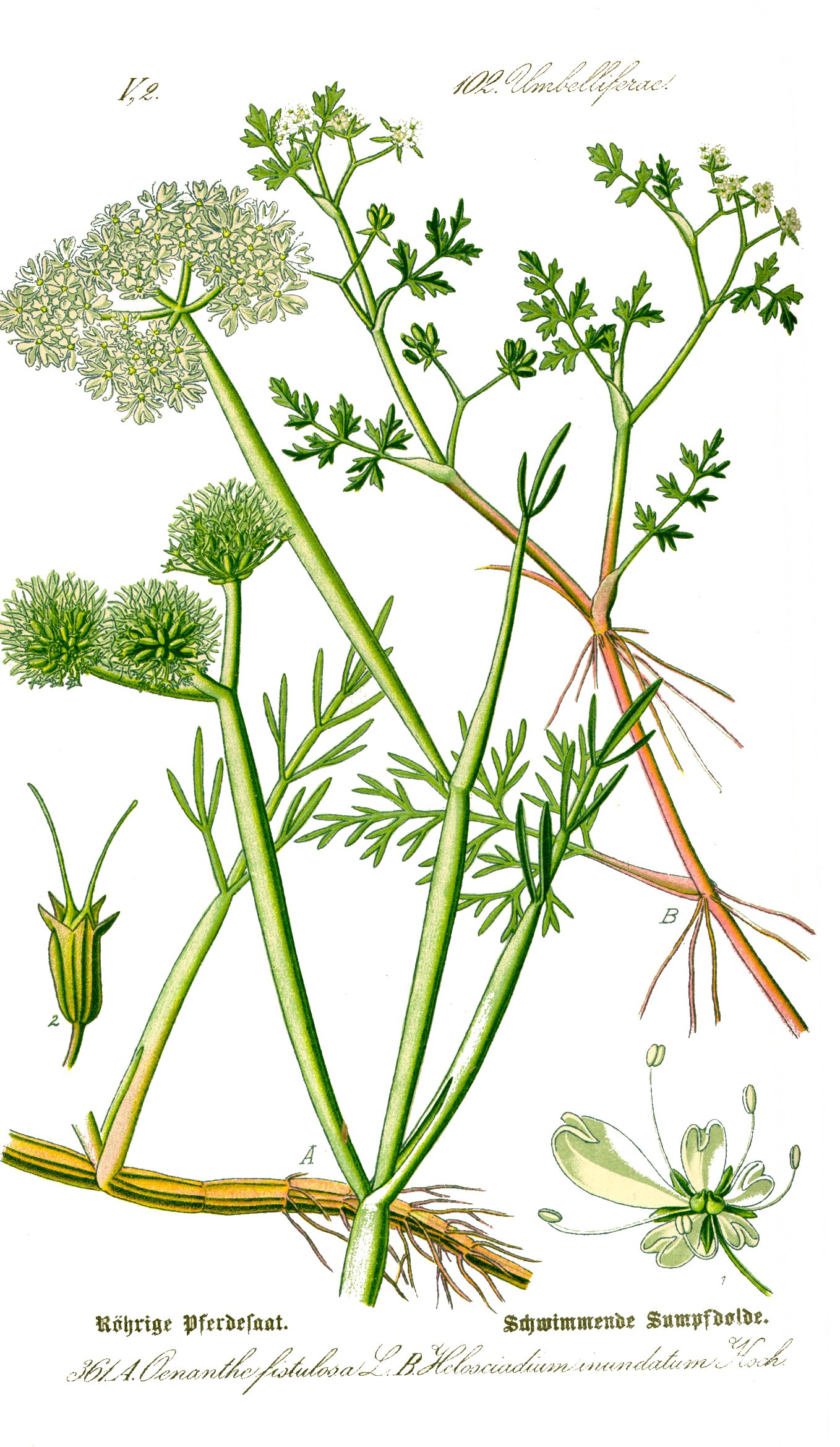
Botanical drawing of tubular water-dropwort

It is a wetland plant, occurring naturally in swamps and marshes along valleys and in river deltas such as the Camargue in France and the Doñana National Park in Spain. In well-drained agricultural landscapes it is now more likely to be found in drainage ditches, farm ponds and grazed wet meadows. In some places it is found as a halophyte in coastal dune slacks or brackish grazing marshes, as at Aiguamolls de l'Empordà in Spain or on the Sefton Coast in Britain.

It favours clean, mesotrophic water, slightly base-rich conditions, and moderately high light levels, which make it an axiophyte in most British counties. In France it is an indicator of the Gratiola officinalis-O. fistulosa community in restored wetlands along the Saône river. In contrast, it is dominant in a type of flooded creeping bent meadows on clay in Italy, in a Ranunculus ophioglossifolius-O. fistulosa community.

In places where it has noticeably declined, attempts have been made to restore its habitat. Wet meadows were sown in the valley of the Meuse in NE France, but after three years it had not colonised them. However, when a species-poor ditch in an area of arable farmland in Romney Marsh was cleared and planted up, O. fistulosa thrived for at least a while, showing that it is not as sensitive to nutrient enrichment as some species.

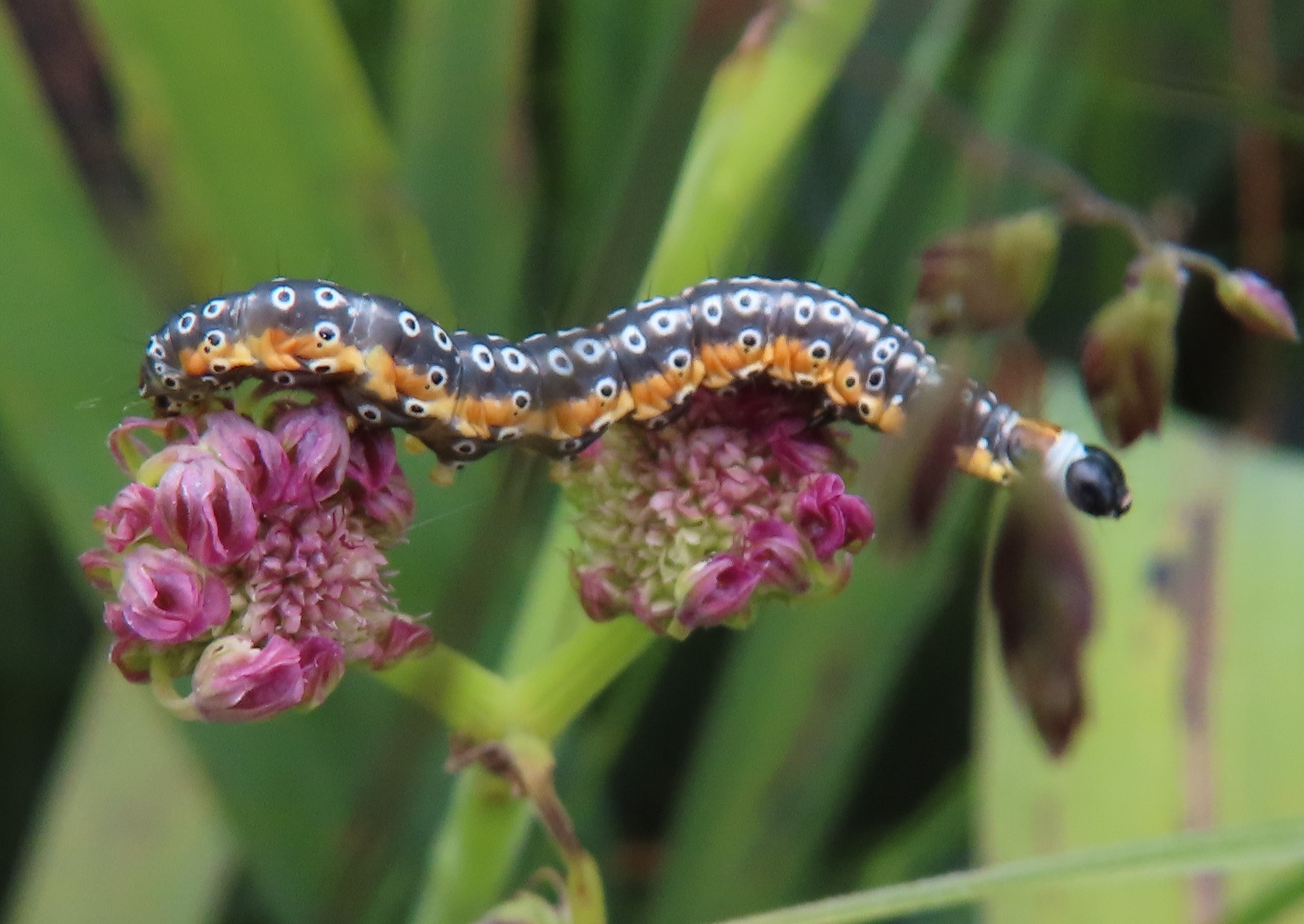
Larva of the moth Depressaria daucella on tubular water-dropwort flowers at Marden, Kent

Its Ellenberg values in Britain are L = 7, F = 9, R = 7, N = 6, and S = 0.

Like other umbellifers, tubular water-dropwort has unspecialised flowers that are pollinated by a wide variety of beetles, flies and other invertebrates. Only a few insects have been found to feed on it: the larvae of the beetle Lixus paraplecticus are phytophagous within the stems; common swallowtail caterpillars eat the leaves (in France); and the larvae of the moth Depressaria daucella cause mines within the leaves or feed on the foliage and flowers.

There are two fungi which cause galls in tubular water-dropwort in Britain: Protomyces macrosporus causes distortion and swelling of the leaves, petioles and stems, while Uromyces lineolatus produces yellowish spots on the lower surface of the leaves and petioles.

== Uses ==
Tubular water-dropwort roots have been found to contain small quantities of Oenanthotoxin, the toxic agent that makes hemlock water-dropwort so dangerous. However, the quantities are much (10 x) lower and it is generally considered safe, or even palatable. Oenanthe fistulosa is freely grazed by livestock. It is used in traditional medicine in Algeria and investigations into the essential oil show there are constituents that could have medical benefits as well as a chemical, Heneicosane, which attracts mosquitoes involved in transmitting Dengue fever.

It has been reported as part of the traditional cuisine in parts of southern Italy and Turkey, where it is known as Gazyak or Kazayağı (a general name for various species of water-dropwort), and the basal leaves are cooked as a meal.

The Irish botanist D.E. Allen suggests that O. fistulosa might be the plant that was reported in County Wicklow as a treatment for rheumatism.
