= Saitoella complicata =

Scientific classification
- Kingdom: Fungi
- Division: Ascomycota
- Class: Taphrinomycetes
- Order: Taphrinales
- Family: Protomycetaceae
- Genus: Saitoella
- Species: S. complicata

Binomial name
- Saitoella complicata Goto, Sugiy., Hamam. & Komag. (1987)

Species of fungus

Saitoella complicata is a rare fungus that is one of the nearest relatives of Schizosaccharomyces pombe, a widely used model species. While related fungi are pathogens of plants or animals, S. complicata feeds on decaying matter. Its genome has been sequenced by the Joint Genome Institute.
