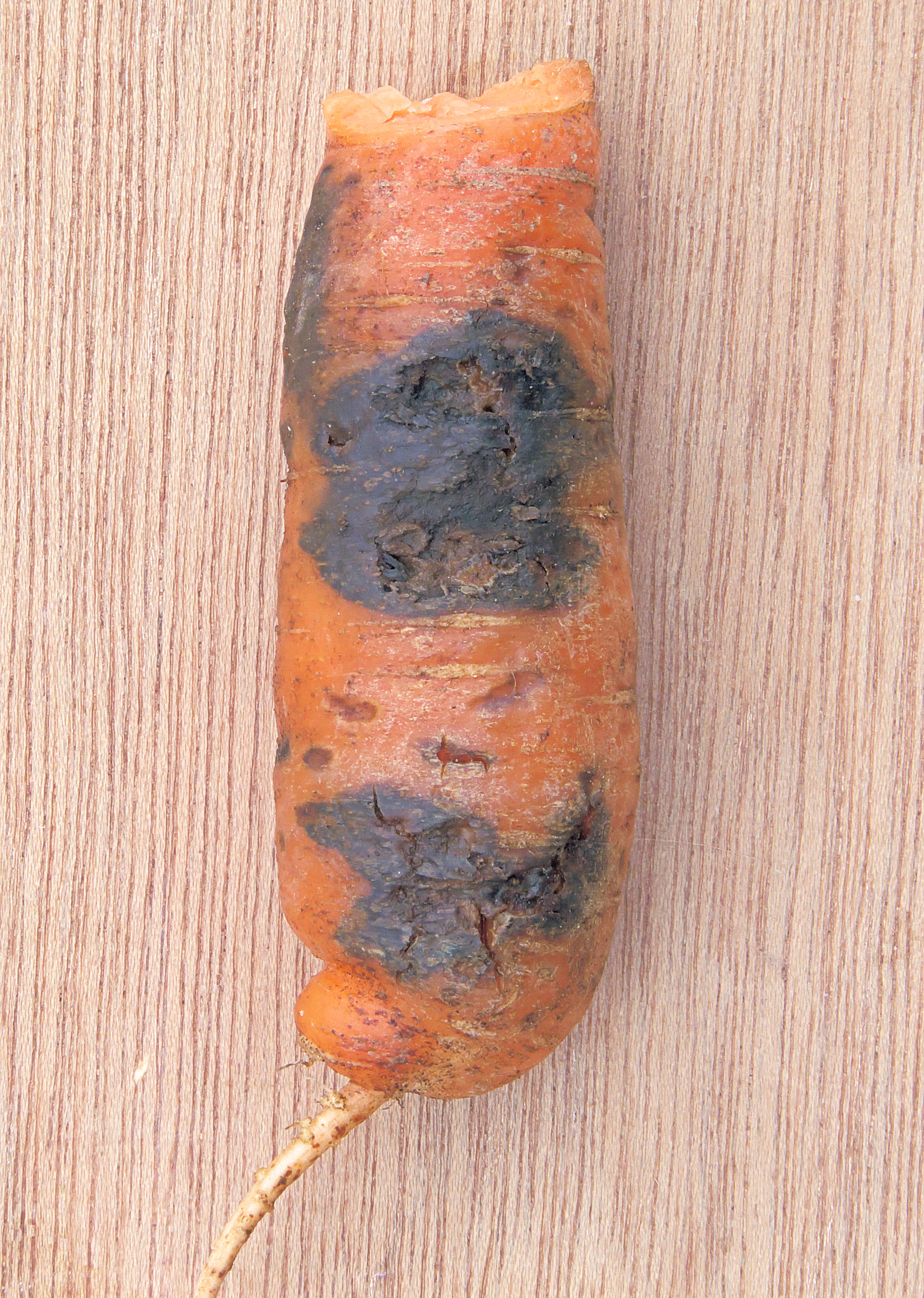
- Black rot on carrot

Scientific classification
- Domain: Eukaryota
- Kingdom: Fungi
- Division: Ascomycota
- Class: Dothideomycetes
- Order: Pleosporales
- Family: Pleosporaceae
- Genus: Alternaria
- Species: A. radicina

Binomial name
- Alternaria radicina Meier, Drechsler & E.D. Eddy, (1922)

Synonyms
- Macrosporium daucinum Yatel, Mikrobiologicheskii Zhurnal 5: 206 (1938); Pseudostemphylium radicinum (Meier, Drechsler & E.D. Eddy) Subram., Curr. Sci. 30: 423 (1961); Stemphylium radicinum (Meier, Drechsler & E.D. Eddy) Neerg., (1939); Thyrospora radicina (Meier, Drechsler & E.D. Eddy) Neerg., (1939)

= Alternaria radicina =

Species of fungus

Alternaria radicina is a fungal plant pathogen infecting carrots.
