= Carrot mottle virus =

Virus classification
- (unranked): Virus
- Realm: Riboviria
- Kingdom: Orthornavirae
- Phylum: Kitrinoviricota
- Class: Tolucaviricetes
- Order: Tolivirales
- Family: Tombusviridae
- Genus: Umbravirus
- Species: Umbravirus maculacarotae

Species of virus

Carrot mottle virus (CMoV) is a plant pathogenic virus.

== Host and symptoms ==
The typical hosts for this virus are apiaceous plants, which is known as the carrot family. The virus specifically targets carrots, parsnips, and cilantro but only effects carrot as this is the only host for the vector. This virus alone does not cause symptoms in carrots, but in connection with Carrot red leaf virus (CRLV) causes yellowing, reddening of leaves and yield loss. This can often be confused as a deficiency in carrots. The paired disease is known as Carrot motley dwarf virus.

== Disease cycle ==
The virus is transmitted by the willow carrot aphid, Cavariella aegopodii. Carrots that survive overwinter are the source of inoculum for the first flush of spring aphids. The aphid transfers the virus as it feeds from host to host. Both CMoV and CRLV are typically found in infected stock and rarely found alone. It takes 30 minutes for the aphid to become a carrier. The aphid is propagative and therefore infects many plants in its lifetime. The virus is kept through the aphid molting, but does not replicate in the vector. Aphids do not feed on cilantro which means although susceptible not likely to be infected.

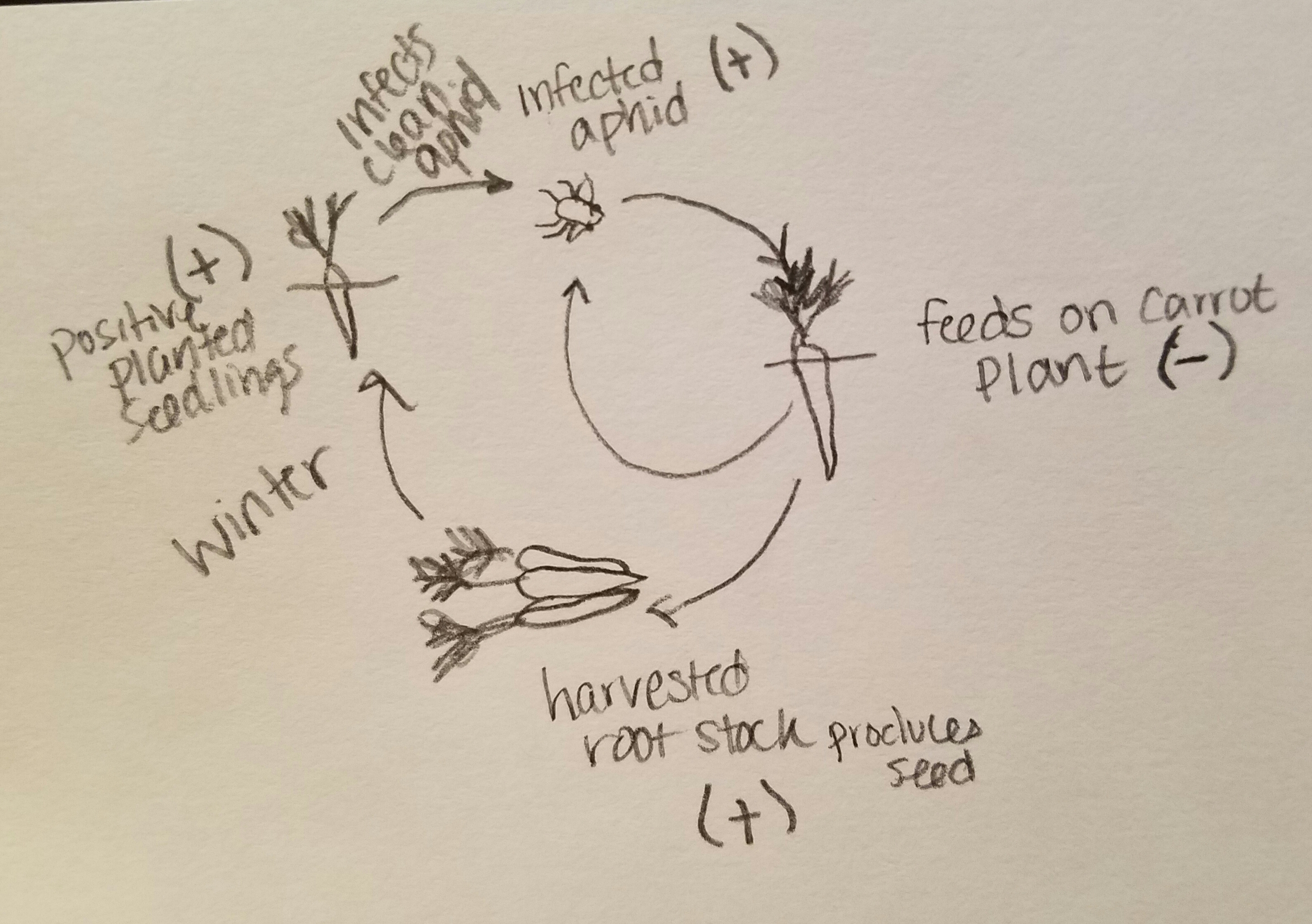

== Environment ==
The environment of the disease depends on two things, location of the vector and location of the carrots grown. 80% of the nation's carrots are grown in California. Washington and Wisconsin are the nation's largest producers of carrots used for processing. The virus is found in cooler production areas or cool wet springs tend to set off the virus, and drier warmer springs limit it. The aphid is wide spread across the United States and its primary host are willow species.

== Management ==
There is some resistance in cultivars such as, CVC 14. Unfortunately, there is no immunity to the disease and other steps must be taken to control infection. If it is an organic operation, then cultural controls are the only factor besides resistance. Avoid planting clean carrots within 5 miles of infected carrots. If conventional then insecticides can be used to control aphids but it is an ineffective control method.

== Importance ==
This virus causes no impact on yield or appearance. When paired with Carrot Red Leaf Virus to make Carrot Mottle virus there is a large impact on yield. The roots are small and deformed. Most of the Californian sales of carrots are to market and fresh produce markets.
