= Saitoella =

Scientific classification
- Kingdom: Fungi
- Division: Ascomycota
- Class: Taphrinomycetes
- Order: Taphrinales
- Family: Protomycetaceae
- Genus: Saitoella; Goto, Sugiy., Hamam. & Komag. (1987)

Type species
- Saitoella complicata Goto, Sugiy., Hamam. & Komag. (1987)

Species
- Saitoella complicata Saitoella coloradoensis

Genus of fungi

Saitoella is a genus of two species of yeast in the family Protomycetaceae.

The genus was circumscribed by Shoji Goto, Junta Sugiyama, Makiko Hamamoto and Kazuo Komagata in J. Gen. Appl. Microbiol., Tokyo vol.33 (1)on page 76 in 1987.

The genus name of Ripartitella is in honour of Kendo Saito (1878–1960), who was a Japanese botanist (Mycology and Lichenology), Microbiologist and Professor from the Osaka University.

The type species, Saitoella complicata, originally isolated from Himalayan soil, had its genome sequenced. The genus is named after professor Kendo Saito for his contributions to the taxonomy of the genus Rhodotorula. A second species, Saitoella coloradoensis, isolated from insect frass found on Engelmann spruce in Colorado, was described as new in 2012.
