= Polerovirus =

Virus classification
- (unranked): Virus
- Realm: Riboviria
- Kingdom: Orthornavirae
- Phylum: Pisuviricota
- Class: Pisoniviricetes
- Order: Sobelivirales
- Family: Solemoviridae
- Genus: Polerovirus

Species
- See text

Genus of viruses

Polerovirus is a genus of viruses, in the family Solemoviridae. Plants serve as natural hosts. There are 94 species in this genus. Diseases associated with this genus include: PLRV causes prominent rolling of the leaves of potato and a stiff upright habit of the plants; necrosis of the phloem and accumulation of carbohydrates in the leaves.

== Structure ==
Viruses in Polerovirus are non-enveloped, with icosahedral and Spherical geometries, and T=3 symmetry. The diameter is around 23 nm. Genomes are linear and non-segmented, around 5.3-5.7kb in length.

Genus	Structure	Symmetry	Capsid	Genomic arrangement	Genomic segmentation
Polerovirus	Icosahedral	T=3	Non-enveloped	Linear	Monopartite

== Life cycle ==
Viral replication is cytoplasmic. Entry into the host cell is achieved by penetration into the host cell. Replication follows the positive stranded RNA virus replication model. Positive stranded RNA virus transcription is the method of transcription. Translation takes place by leaky scanning, −1 ribosomal frameshifting, and suppression of termination. The virus exits the host cell by tubule-guided viral movement. Plants serve as the natural host. The virus is transmitted via a vector (plrv: myzus persicae). Transmission routes are vector and mechanical.

Genus	Host details	Tissue tropism	Entry details	Release details	Replication site	Assembly site	Transmission
Polerovirus	Plants	Phloem	Viral movement; mechanical inoculation	Viral movement	Cytoplasm	Cytoplasm	Mechanical inoculation: aphids

== Taxonomy ==
The genus contains the following species, listed by scientific name and followed by the exemplar virus of the species:

- Polerovirus ACTPV, Actinidia polerovirus
- Polerovirus AEYV, African eggplant yellowing virus
- Polerovirus AGV, Agratum virus 3
- Polerovirus APVA, Allium polerovirus A
- Polerovirus ARMOV, Arachis mottle-associated virus
- Polerovirus ARTVB, Artemisia virus B
- Polerovirus BCHV, Beet chlorosis virus
- Polerovirus BLYV, Beet leaf yellowing virus
- Polerovirus BMYV, Beet mild yellowing virus
- Polerovirus BPV, Barleria polerovirus 1
- Polerovirus BVG, Barley virus G
- Polerovirus BWYV, Beet western yellows virus
- Polerovirus CABYV, Cucurbit aphid-borne yellows virus
- Polerovirus CALRV, Cacao leafroll virus
- Polerovirus CAPV, Carrot polerovirus 2
- Polerovirus CBTV1, Cotton bunchy top virus 1
- Polerovirus CBTV2, Cotton bunchy top virus 2
- Polerovirus CDPV, Cardamom polerovirus
- Polerovirus CHDV, Chrysanthemum virus D
- Polerovirus CLDV, Cotton leafroll dwarf virus
- Polerovirus CNPV, Cnidium polerovirus 1
- Polerovirus CPCSV, Chickpea chlorotic stunt virus
- Polerovirus CPLRV, Chickpea leafroll virus
- Polerovirus CPPV1, Cowpea polerovirus 1
- Polerovirus CPPV2, Cowpea polerovirus 2
- Polerovirus CSPV, Cassava polerovirus
- Polerovirus CTRLV, Carrot red leaf virus
- Polerovirus CYDVRPS, Cereal yellow dwarf virus-RPS
- Polerovirus CYDVRPV, Cereal yellow dwarf virus-RPV
- Polerovirus CYMAV, Cynanchum yellow mottle-associated virus
- Polerovirus DVPV, Dregea volubilis polerovirus 1
- Polerovirus FBPV, Faba bean polerovirus 1
- Polerovirus FEQPV, Ficus esquiroliana polerovirus
- Polerovirus FVPV, Foeniculum vulgare polerovirus
- Polerovirus GLPV, Gladiolus polerovirus
- Polerovirus GPOV, Grapevine polerovirus 1
- Polerovirus GRAV, Groundnut rosette assistor virus
- Polerovirus HEMVA, Hemisteptia virus A
- Polerovirus IXYMAV, Ixeridium yellow mottle virus 1
- Polerovirus KMPV, Kalanchoe marnieriana polerovirus
- Polerovirus LABYV, Luffa aphid-borne yellows virus
- Polerovirus MABYV, Melon aphid-borne yellows virus
- Polerovirus MAYMV, Maize yellow mosaic virus
- Polerovirus MJVA, Mallotus japonicus virus A
- Polerovirus MUSPV, Musa polerovirus
- Polerovirus MYDVRMV, Maize yellow dwarf virus-RMV
- Polerovirus MYFV, Miscanthus yellow fleck virus
- Polerovirus NBPV, Noble dendrobium polerovirus
- Polerovirus ORMV, Ornithogalum virus 5
- Polerovirus PABYV, Pepo aphid-borne yellows virus
- Polerovirus PBMYV, Phasey bean mild yellows virus
- Polerovirus PDMV, Panicum distortion mosaic virus
- Polerovirus PELRCV, Pepper leafroll chlorosis virus
- Polerovirus PEVYV1, Pepper vein yellows virus 1
- Polerovirus PEVYV2, Pepper vein yellows virus 2
- Polerovirus PEVYV3, Pepper vein yellows virus 3
- Polerovirus PEVYV4, Pepper vein yellows virus 4
- Polerovirus PEVYV5, Pepper vein yellows virus 5
- Polerovirus PEVYV6, Pepper vein yellows virus 6
- Polerovirus PEVYV10, Pepper vein yellows virus 10
- Polerovirus PEWBVYV, Pepper whitefly borne vein yellow virus
- Polerovirus PLAVA, Plantago asiatica virus A
- Polerovirus PLRV, Potato leafroll virus
- Polerovirus PMPV, Piper methysticum polerovirus
- Polerovirus PNPV, Paspalum notatum polerovirus
- Polerovirus PPEVYV, Pod pepper vein yellows virus
- Polerovirus PPOV, Persimmon polerovirus
- Polerovirus PTPV, Pterostylis polerovirus
- Polerovirus PUPV, Pumpkin polerovirus
- Polerovirus RDPV, Rice polerovirus
- Polerovirus SABYV, Suakwa aphid-borne yellows virus
- Polerovirus SAYV, Sauropus yellowing virus
- Polerovirus SBCLRV, Soybean chlorotic leafroll virus
- Polerovirus SCYLV, Sugarcane yellow leaf virus
- Polerovirus SLBPV, Sweet leaf bush polerovirus
- Polerovirus SLPV, Siratro latent polerovirus
- Polerovirus SPLSV, Sweet potato leaf speckling virus
- Polerovirus SPRPV, Spruce polerovirus
- Polerovirus SPV, Strawberry polerovirus 1
- Polerovirus STAVB, Stellaria aquatica virus B
- Polerovirus TAPV, Trachyspermum ammi polerovirus
- Polerovirus TCLV, Torilis crimson leaf virus
- Polerovirus TNDV, Tobacco necrotic dwarf virus
- Polerovirus TPV1, Tobacco polerovirus 1
- Polerovirus TPV2, Tobacco polerovirus 2
- Polerovirus TRIYSV, Triticum yellow stripe virus
- Polerovirus TUYV, Turnip yellows virus
- Polerovirus TVDV, Tobacco vein distorting virus
- Polerovirus UPOV, Ullucus polerovirus 1
- Polerovirus VPPV, Viola philippica polerovirus
- Polerovirus WCMV, White clover mottle virus
- Polerovirus WLYAV, Wheat leaf yellowing-associated virus
- Polerovirus WYDVGPV, Barley yellow dwarf virus-GPV
- Polerovirus ZABYV, Zucchini aphid-borne yellows virus
