= Hoplolaimus uniformis =

Scientific classification
- Kingdom: Animalia
- Phylum: Nematoda
- Class: Secernentea
- Order: Tylenchida
- Family: Hoplolaimidae
- Genus: Hoplolaimus
- Species: H. uniformis

Binomial name
- Hoplolaimus uniformis Thorne, 1949

Species of roundworm

Hoplolaimus uniformis is a plant pathogenic nematode affecting carrots. It is suggested that this is synonymous with Rotylenchus robustus.

== See also ==
- List of carrot diseases
