= Pea enation mosaic virus =

Pea enation mosaic virus 1

Virus classification
- (unranked): Virus
- Realm: Riboviria
- Kingdom: Orthornavirae
- Phylum: Pisuviricota
- Class: Pisoniviricetes
- Order: Sobelivirales
- Family: Solemoviridae
- Genus: Enamovirus
- Species: Enamovirus PEMV

Species of virus

Pea enation mosaic virus 2

Virus classification
- (unranked): Virus
- Realm: Riboviria
- Kingdom: Orthornavirae
- Phylum: Kitrinoviricota
- Class: Tolucaviricetes
- Order: Tolivirales
- Family: Tombusviridae
- Genus: Umbravirus
- Species: Umbravirus pisi

Pea enation mosaic virus (PEMV) is two plant pathogenic viruses. The two viruses, once classified as one, are now categorised as two separate, mutualistic viruses:

- Pea enation mosaic virus 1 is an Enamovirus
- Pea enation mosaic virus 2 is an Umbravirus

They are spread by green- or pea aphids and affects such legumes as pea, alfalfa, broadbean or sweet pea mostly in temperate regions.

Symptoms include chlorotic, translucent or necrotic lesions, malformation of leaves and stipules, and plant distortion. However, the most characteristic symptom is the formation of enations on the abaxial, i.e. downy, leaf side. Enations are derived from the cells of vascular bundles undergoing hyperplasia.
