= Buerenia =

Scientific classification
- Kingdom: Fungi
- Division: Ascomycota
- Class: Taphrinomycetes
- Order: Taphrinales
- Family: Protomycetaceae
- Genus: Buerenia; M.S.Reddy & C.L.Kramer (1975)

Type species
- Buerenia cicutae (Lindr.) M.S.Reddy & C.L.Kramer (1975)

Species
- Buerenia cicutae Buerenia inundata Buerenia myrrhidendri

Genus of fungi

Buerenia is a genus of fungi in the family Protomycetaceae. It was described in 1975. Species of Buerenia are parasitic on Apiaceae plants, on which they cause swellings and blisters on leaves and stems.
