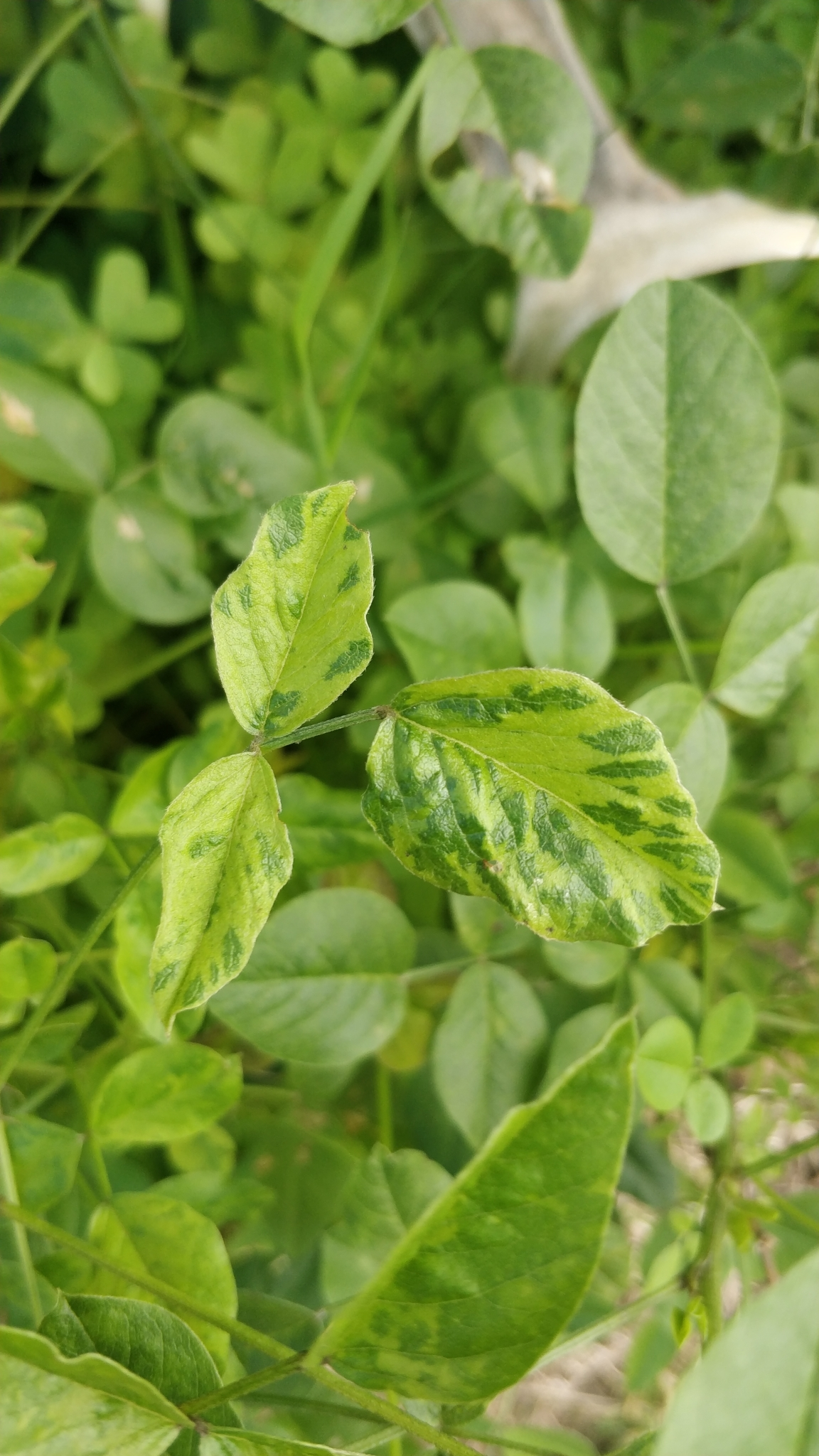
- Pea Enation Mosaic Virus

Virus classification
- (unranked): Virus
- Realm: Riboviria
- Kingdom: Orthornavirae
- Phylum: Pisuviricota
- Class: Pisoniviricetes
- Order: Sobelivirales
- Family: Solemoviridae
- Genus: Enamovirus

= Enamovirus =

Genus of viruses

Enamovirus is a genus of viruses, in the family Solemoviridae. Plants serve as natural hosts. There are 25 species in this genus. Diseases associated with this genus include: pea enation disease: if both PEMV-1 and PEMV-2 are present.

== Structure ==
Viruses in Enamovirus are non-enveloped, with icosahedral and Spherical geometries, and T=3 symmetry. The diameter is around 25 nm. Genomes are linear and non-segmented, around 5.7kb in length.

Genus	Structure	Symmetry	Capsid	Genomic arrangement	Genomic segmentation
Enamovirus	Icosahedral	T=3	Non-enveloped	Linear	Monopartite

== Taxonomy ==
The genus contains the following species, listed by scientific name and followed by the exemplar virus of the species:

- Enamovirus AEV, Alfalfa enamovirus 1
- Enamovirus AGV, Ageratum virus 2
- Enamovirus ALVE, Arracacha latent virus E
- Enamovirus BEV, Bean enamovirus 1
- Enamovirus BFTEV, Bird's-foot trefoil enamovirus 1
- Enamovirus BPVE, Black pepper virus E
- Enamovirus BUBEV, Bunge's buttercup enamovirus
- Enamovirus CAEV, Carrot enamovirus
- Enamovirus CLEV, Celmisia lyallii enamovirus
- Enamovirus CSEV, Coriandrum sativum enamovirus
- Enamovirus CTEV, Common thyme enamovirus
- Enamovirus CVEV, Citrus vein enation virus
- Enamovirus DEGEV, Decurrent goldenrod enamovirus
- Enamovirus FTEV, Fukien tea tree enamovirus
- Enamovirus GEV, Grapevine enamovirus 1
- Enamovirus GSPEV, Green Sichuan pepper enamovirus
- Enamovirus KSEV, Kummerowia striatad enamovirus
- Enamovirus ORAEV, Oriental arborvitae enamovirus
- Enamovirus PEEV, Pepper enamovirus
- Enamovirus PEMV, Pea enation mosaic virus 1
- Enamovirus PLEV, Plantago enamovirus
- Enamovirus RAEV, Raspberry enamovirus
- Enamovirus RCEV, Red clover enamovirus 1
- Enamovirus WSEV, Western salsify enamovirus
- Enamovirus YPEV, Yunnan pine enamovirus

== Life cycle ==
Viral replication is cytoplasmic. Entry into the host cell is achieved by penetration into the host cell. Replication follows the positive stranded RNA virus replication model. Positive stranded RNA virus transcription is the method of transcription. Translation takes place by leaky scanning, -1 ribosomal frameshifting, and suppression of termination. The virus exits the host cell by tubule-guided viral movement. Plants serve as the natural host. The virus is transmitted via a vector (insects). Transmission routes are vector and mechanical.

Genus	Host details	Tissue tropism	Entry details	Release details	Replication site	Assembly site	Transmission
Enamovirus	Plants	Phloem	Viral movement; mechanical inoculation	Viral movement	Cytoplasm	Cytoplasm	Mechanical inoculation: aphids
