= Peronospora crustosa =

Scientific classification
- Domain: Eukaryota
- Clade: Sar
- Clade: Stramenopiles
- Phylum: Oomycota
- Class: Peronosporomycetes
- Order: Peronosporales
- Family: Peronosporaceae
- Genus: Peronospora
- Species: P. crustosa

Binomial name
- Peronospora crustosa (Fr.) Fr.

Synonyms
- List: Botrytis crustosa Fr.; Peronospora macrospora Rabenh.; Peronospora podagrariae G.H.Otth; Peronospora umbelliferarum Casp.; Peronospora umbelliferarum var. aegopodii Casp.; Peronospora umbelliferarum var. angelicae Casp.; Peronospora umbelliferarum var. berkeleyi Ces.; Peronospora umbelliferarum var. chaerophylli Casp.; Peronospora umbelliferarum var. conii Casp.; Plasmopara angelicae (Casp.) Trotter; Plasmopara chaerophylli (Casp.) Trotter; Plasmopara conii (Casp.) Trotter; Plasmopara crustosa (Fr.) Jørst.; Plasmopara pimpinellae Trevis. & O.Săvul.; Plasmopara pimpinellae var. maioris Wrońska; Plasmopara podagrariae (G.H.Otth) Nannf.; Plasmopara umbelliferarum (Casp.) J.Schröt.; Plasmopara umbelliferarum (Casp.) J.Schröt. ex Wartenw.; Plasmopara umbelliferarum var. hacquetiae Skalický; Rhysotheca umbelliferarum (Casp.) G.W.Wilson; Verticillium crustosum (Fr.) Rabenh.

Species of single-celled organism

Peronospora crustosa is a downy mildew infecting plants in the genus Heracleum, though the name has historically been used to refer to species of Plasmopara infecting other host plants in the Apiaceae.
