= Lettuce speckles mottle virus =

Virus classification
- (unranked): Virus
- Realm: Riboviria
- Kingdom: Orthornavirae
- Phylum: Kitrinoviricota
- Class: Tolucaviricetes
- Order: Tolivirales
- Family: Tombusviridae
- Genus: Umbravirus
- Species: Umbravirus lactucae

Species of virus

Lettuce speckles mottle virus (LSMV) is a pathogenic plant virus.
