= Fusarium oxysporum f.sp. spinacia =

Scientific classification
- Domain: Eukaryota
- Kingdom: Fungi
- Division: Ascomycota
- Class: Sordariomycetes
- Order: Hypocreales
- Family: Nectriaceae
- Genus: Fusarium
- Species: F. oxysporum
- Forma specialis: F. o. f.sp. spinacia

Trionomial name
- Fusarium oxysporum f.sp. spinacia W.C. Snyder & H.N. Hansen

Synonyms
- Fusarium oxysporum f.sp. spinaciae (Sherb.) W.C. Snyder & H.N. Hansen, (1940); Fusarium redolens f.sp. spinaciae (Sherb.) Subram., (1971); Fusarium spinaciae Sherb.

Fungal plant pathogen

Fusarium oxysporum f.sp. spinacia is a fungal plant pathogen. It is a forma specialis of Fusarium oxysporum on spinach.

== Biological control ==
Clostridium beijerinckii was found by Ueki et al. 2019 to suppress the pathogen when amended to the soil.
