= Carrot latent virus =

Carrot latent virus (CtLV)

Virus classification
- Group: Group V ((−)ssRNA)
- Family: Rhabdoviridae
- Genus: Nucleorhabdovirus
- Species: Carrot latent virus

Species of virus

Carrot latent virus (CtLV) is a plant pathogenic virus of the family Rhabdoviridae.
