= Pythium paroecandrum =

Scientific classification
- Domain: Eukaryota
- Clade: Sar
- Clade: Stramenopiles
- Phylum: Oomycota
- Class: Peronosporomycetes
- Order: Peronosporales
- Family: Pythiaceae
- Genus: Pythium
- Species: P. paroecandrum

Binomial name
- Pythium paroecandrum Drechsler, (1930)

Species of single-celled organism

Pythium paroecandrum is a plant pathogen infecting carrots and impatiens.
