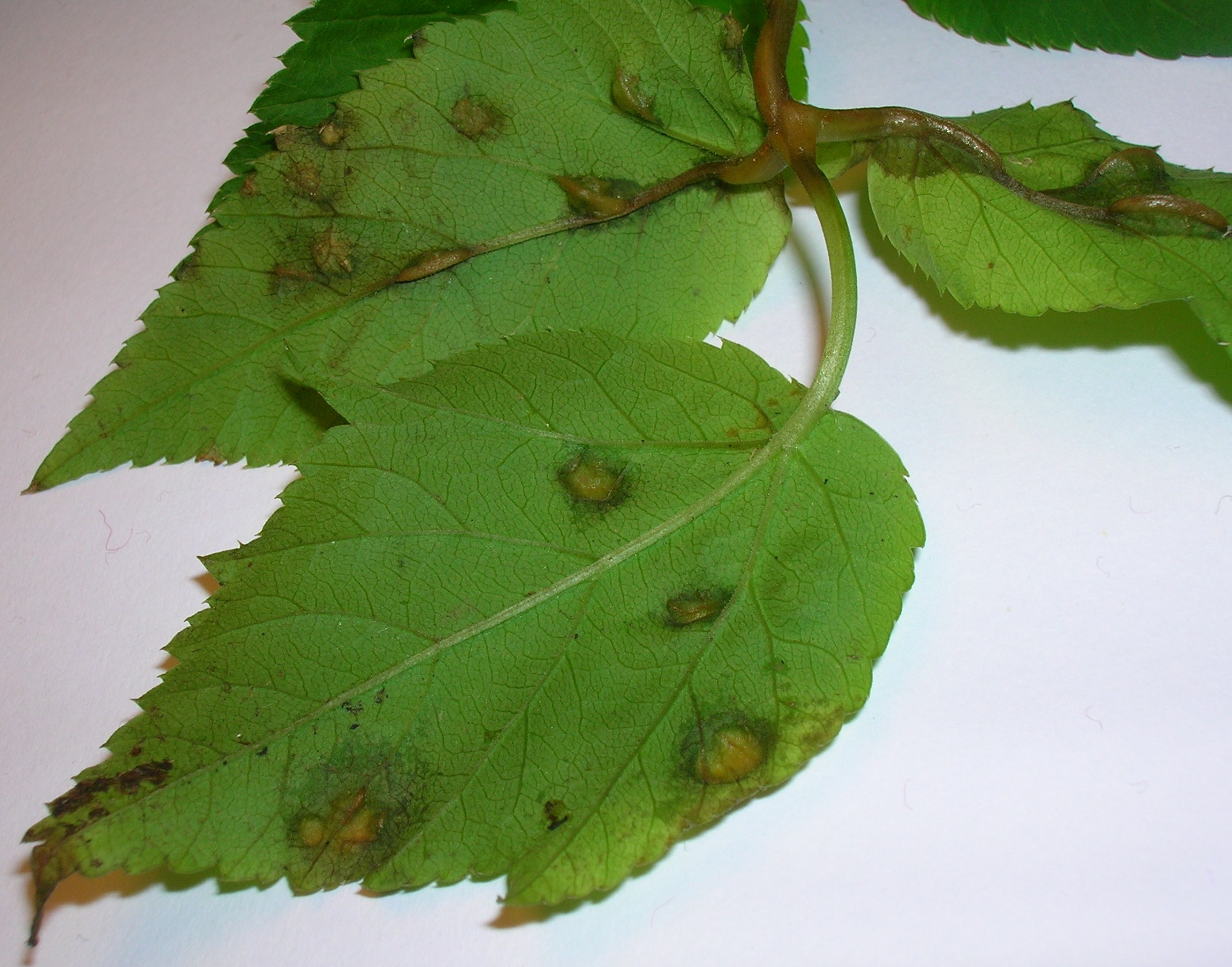
- Galls on the lower surface of Aegopodium podagraria leaf

Scientific classification
- Domain: Eukaryota
- Kingdom: Fungi
- Division: Ascomycota
- Class: Taphrinomycetes
- Order: Taphrinales
- Family: Protomycetaceae
- Genus: Protomyces
- Species: P. macrosporus

Binomial name
- Protomyces macrosporus Unger, 1834

= Protomyces macrosporus =

Species of fungus

Protomyces macrosporus is an ascomycete fungus that forms galls on Aegopodium podagraria, Anthriscus sylvestris, Angelica sylvestris, Daucus carota and some other members of the family Umbelliferae or Apiaceae, commonly known as umbellifers. Fourteen genera within the Asteraceae are also galled by P. macrosporus. The description of the genus was based on Protomyces macrosporus as the type genus for the family Protomycetaceae.

== Physical appearance ==
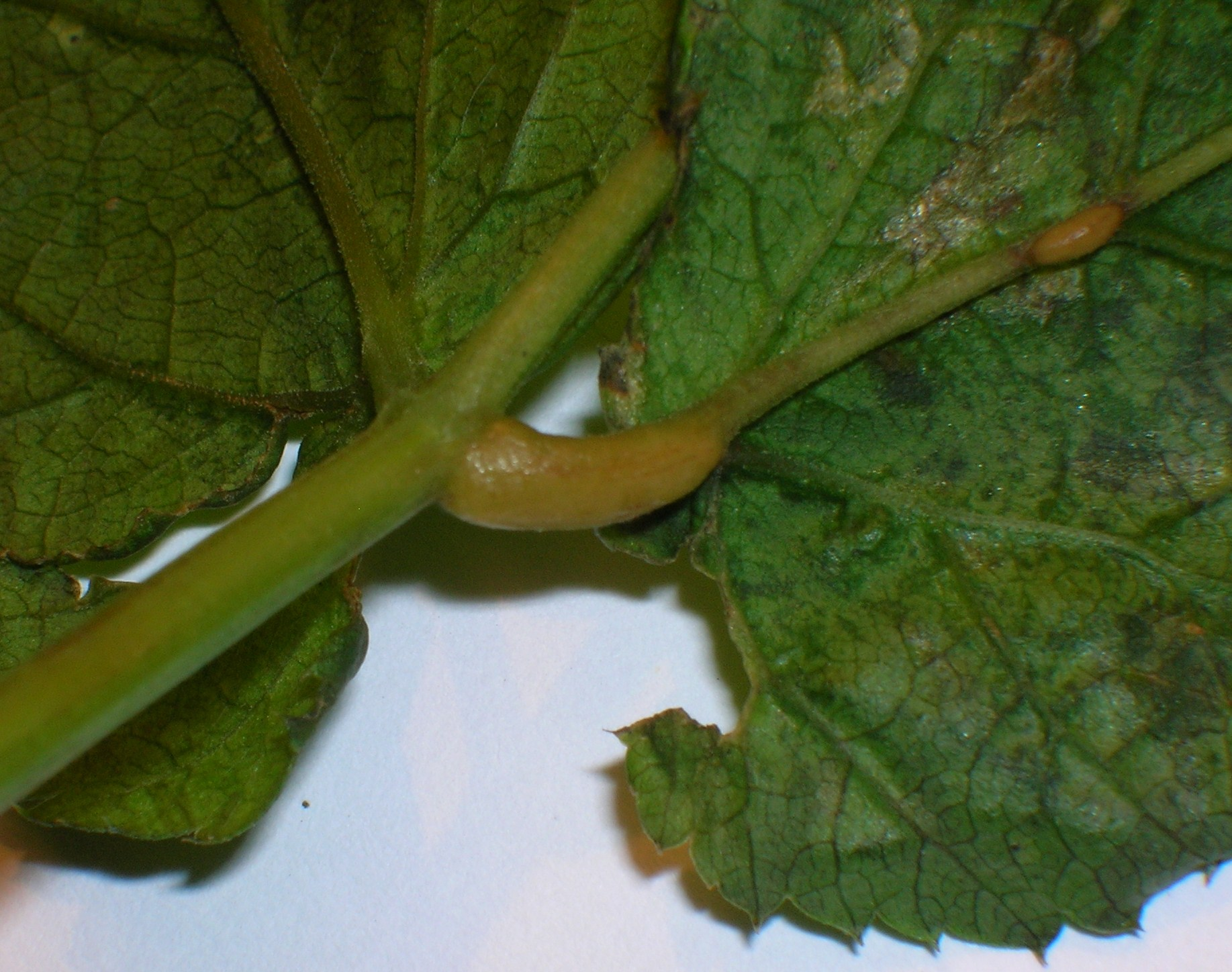
P. macrosporus galls on a petiole and mid-rib of A. podagraria

The gall develops as a chemically induced swelling, arising from the surface of the leaf lamina, veins, mid-ribs, and petiole. On the leaf lamina it forms yellowish bulges standing out on the upper surface, but missing the black sori that are typical of an otherwise similar gall caused by the rust fungus Puccinia aegopodii. On veins, mid-ribs and petioles the gall appears as translucent yellow-white swellings that are often elongated and blister-like. It is particularly apparent in early spring when the greatly distorted leaves first appear.

== Life cycle ==
Protomyces macrosporus has a complex life cycle including ascospores and chlamydospores. Spores reach the hosts via air movements and are spread from the galls that develop on the petioles, midrib veins, and lamina; they will only germinate on the correct host.

== Distribution ==
The species has been recorded in Scotland, Ireland, Norway, Denmark, Sweden, Nepal, Germany, North America, North Africa and South Asia.

== Agricultural significance ==
The stem gall caused by Protomyces macrosporus is the most serious and widespread disease of coriander in the Chitwan valley of Nepal.
