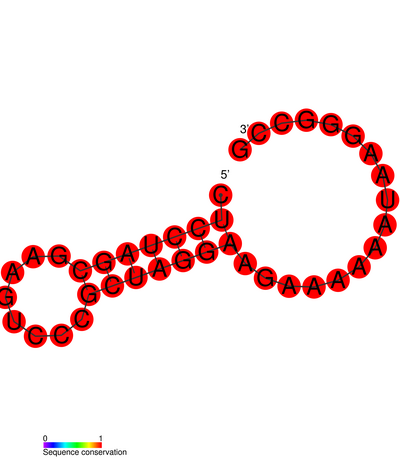

Virus classification
- (unranked): Virus
- Realm: Riboviria
- Kingdom: Orthornavirae
- Phylum: Pisuviricota
- Class: Pisoniviricetes
- Order: Sobelivirales
- Family: Solemoviridae
- Genus: Polerovirus
- Species: Polerovirus BWYV

Synonyms
- beet mild yellowing virus malva yellows virus pea leaf roll virus — New Zealand radish yellows virus turnip mild yellows virus

= Beet western yellows virus =

Species of virus

Beet western yellows virus (BWYV) is a plant pathogenic virus of the family Solemoviridae.
