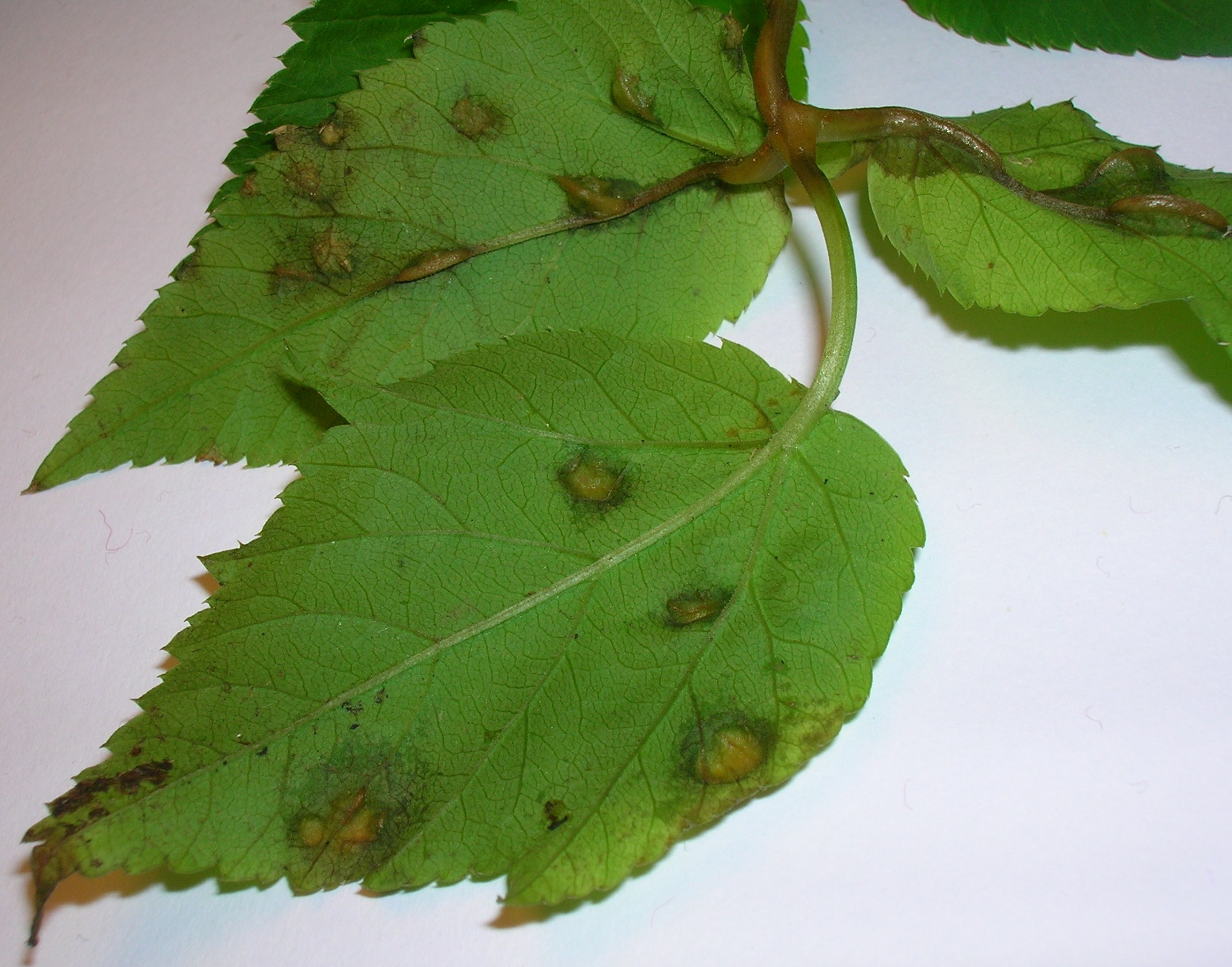
- Protomyces macrosporus on the lower surface of a leaf of Aegopodium podagraria

Scientific classification
- Kingdom: Fungi
- Division: Ascomycota
- Class: Taphrinomycetes
- Order: Taphrinales
- Family: Protomycetaceae; Gray (1821)

Type genus
- Protomyces Unger (1833)

Genera
- Buerenia; Protomyces; Protomycopsis; Saitoella; Taphridium; Volkartia

= Protomycetaceae =

Family of fungi

The Protomycetaceae are a family of fungi in the order Taphrinales. According to a 2008 estimate, the family contains 6 genera and 22 species.
