= Aecidium foeniculi =

Scientific classification
- Kingdom: Fungi
- Division: Basidiomycota
- Class: Pucciniomycetes
- Order: Pucciniales
- Family: incertae sedis
- Genus: Aecidium
- Species: A. foeniculi

Binomial name
- Aecidium foeniculi Castagne (1842)

Species of fungus

Aecidium foeniculi is a species of fungus in the Pucciniales order. It is a plant pathogen. It causes white rust in carrots.
