= Carrot red leaf virus =

Virus classification
- (unranked): Virus
- Realm: Riboviria
- Kingdom: Orthornavirae
- Phylum: Pisuviricota
- Class: Pisoniviricetes
- Order: Sobelivirales
- Family: Solemoviridae
- Genus: Polerovirus
- Species: Polerovirus CTRLV

Synonyms
- Carrot motley dwarf virus

Species of virus

Carrot red leaf virus (CtRLV) is a plant pathogenic virus of the family Solemoviridae.
