= Umbravirus =

Virus classification
- (unranked): Virus
- Realm: Riboviria
- Kingdom: Orthornavirae
- Phylum: Kitrinoviricota
- Class: Tolucaviricetes
- Order: Tolivirales
- Family: Tombusviridae
- Subfamily: Calvusvirinae
- Genus: Umbravirus

Genus of viruses

Umbravirus is a genus of plant viruses assigned to the family Tombusviridae. The genus has 11 species.

Transmission may be by aphids or mechanical inoculation. The genome is a linear, positive-sense, single-stranded RNA, 4200–6900 nucleotides in length.

== Taxonomy ==
The genus contains the following species, listed by scientific name and followed by their common names:

- Umbravirus arachidis, Groundnut rosette virus
- Umbravirus carotae, Carrot mottle mimic virus
- Umbravirus ethiopiaense, Ethiopian tobacco bushy top virus
- Umbravirus ixeridii, Ixeridium yellow mottle virus 2
- Umbravirus lactucae, Lettuce speckles mottle virus
- Umbravirus maculacarotae, Carrot mottle virus
- Umbravirus maculae, Tobacco mottle virus
- Umbravirus nicotianae, Tobacco bushy top virus
- Umbravirus papaveri, Opium poppy mosaic virus
- Umbravirus patriniae, Patrinia mild mottle virus
- Umbravirus pisi, Pea enation mosaic virus 2
