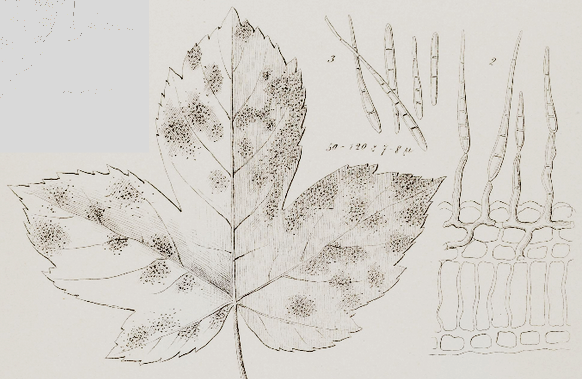
- Symptoms of Mycocentrospora acerina on a maple leaf, and microscopic drawing of the fungus inserting between the cells of the leaf

Scientific classification
- Kingdom: Fungi
- Division: Ascomycota
- Class: Dothideomycetes
- Order: Pleosporales
- Family: incertae sedis
- Genus: Mycocentrospora
- Species: M. acerina

Binomial name
- Mycocentrospora acerina (R. Hartig) Deighton, (1972)

Synonyms
- Ansatospora acerina (R. Hartig) H.N. Hansen & Tompkins, (1945); Centrospora acerina (R. Hartig) A.G. Newhall, (1946); Cercospora acerina R. Hartig, (1880); Cercospora cari Westerd., (1924); Cercosporella acerina (R. Hartig) G. Arnaud, (1952); Sporidesmium acerinum (R. Hartig) A.B. Frank, (1896)

= Mycocentrospora acerina =

Species of fungus

Mycocentrospora acerina is a deuteromycete fungus that is a plant pathogen.

== Hosts and symptoms ==
Mycocentrospora acerina has a wide host range effecting vegetables, ornamentals and weeds. Umbelliferous (carrot family) crops are particularly vulnerable and among the most economically important of the hosts. Mycocentrospora acerina causes an important post-harvest disease named "liquorice rot" in carrots which have been the most studied host. During the growing stage of carrots, the pathogen can cause damping-off and death of seedlings, stunting, early senescence, and leaf lesions that are brown necrotic flecks. Once the carrots are in storage the liquorice rot occurs where root lesions appear that are black in color.

== Disease cycle ==
Mycocentrospora acerina is a deuteromycete (no sexual stage) soil-borne fungus that is a root inhabitant. The life cycle starts and ends with the chlamydospore. The chlamydospore is a thick walled, dark pigmented resting spore that overwinters in the soil or plant debris and can stay dormant for several years without losing viability. It will only germinate in the soil when it senses a host root nearby or when conditions are right when it is on the surface. In the soil it will produce germ tubes and mycelial growth that will infect the root through a wound and begin producing more chlamydospores. On the surface the chlamydospore will produce a short germ tube with terminal conidia attached that will disperse through water and infect a leaf. The leaf infection will create a lesion where conidiophores will produce conidia. The conidia will then be dispersed through rain splash and infect other leaves. Some conidia that end up in the soil will convert into chlamydospores for survival.

== Environment ==
Mycocentrospora acerina is found in temperate climates and grows best at 18 degrees Celsius (65 degrees Fahrenheit). The temperate climate leads to long refrigeration time for the carrots that induces the storage rot. Rainfall is needed to induce sporulation and dispersal of conidia. The pathogen has a greater impact in sandy soils and this is hypothesized to be that the host roots take more wounds in sandy soils and that there is less microflora to buffer the pathogen. Growing hosts plants in rotation allows for the buildup of chlamydospores in the soil from infected plant litter, allowing for greater disease rates over time.

== Other ==
Falcarindiol (cis-heptadeca-1,9-diene-4,6-diyne-3,8-diol) is a polyacetylene found in carrot roots. This compound shows antifungal activity towards M. acerina.
