= Sclerotinia minor =

Scientific classification
- Kingdom: Fungi
- Division: Ascomycota
- Class: Leotiomycetes
- Order: Helotiales
- Family: Sclerotiniaceae
- Genus: Sclerotinia
- Species: S. minor

Binomial name
- Sclerotinia minor Jagger, (1920)

Synonyms
- Sclerotinia intermedia Ramsey, (1924)

Species of fungus

Sclerotinia minor (white mold) is a plant pathogen infecting Chicory, Radicchio, carrots, tomatoes, sunflowers, peanuts and lettuce.
