= Uromyces lineolatus subsp. nearcticus =

Scientific classification
- Domain: Eukaryota
- Kingdom: Fungi
- Division: Basidiomycota
- Class: Pucciniomycetes
- Order: Pucciniales
- Family: Pucciniaceae
- Genus: Uromyces
- Species: U. lineolatus
- Subspecies: U. l. subsp. nearcticus

Trinomial name
- Uromyces lineolatus subsp. nearcticus Savile (1973)

Species of fungus

Uromyces lineolatus subsp. nearcticus is a plant pathogen infecting carrots.
