= Globisporangium sylvaticum =

Scientific classification
- Domain: Eukaryota
- Supergroup: Stramenopiles
- Division: Oomycota
- Class: Peronosporomycetes
- Order: Peronosporales
- Family: Pythiaceae
- Genus: Globisporangium
- Species: G. sylvaticum

Binomial name
- Globisporangium sylvaticum (W.A. Campb. & F.F. Hendrix) Uzuhashi, Tojo & Kakish., 2010

Synonyms
- Pythium sylvaticum

Species of single-celled organism

Globisporangium sylvaticum is a plant pathogen, an oomycete known to cause root rot and damping off in a multitude of species. These species include apples, carrot, cherry laurel, cress, cucumber, garlic, lettuce, pea, rhododendron, and spinach. Symptoms of infection include stunting, wilt, chlorosis, and browning and eventual necrosis of roots. The pathogen can by identified by the presence of thick, microscopic, round spores within the cells of the root.

The species was formerly placed in the genus Pythium, but that genus has been divided into five distinct clades, each characterized by the morphology of the sporangium.

== Disease cycle ==
Globisporangium sylvaticum is known to be heterothallic, whereas other species in the basionym Pythium were consistently known to be homothallic. Additionally, oospores have been shown to occur only in specific pairings of certain sporangial isolates, a finding which reinforces its heterothallic nature. Since the pathogen is an oomycete, it is known to produce several types of spores including sporangia, zoospores, and oospores.

The pathogen begins its life cycle in the growth stage by constructing a well developed mycelium made of hyaline hyphae. This mycelium is the actively growing body of the pathogen and is responsible for the infection of the host, the subsequent colonization of the host plant, and the uptake of nutrients from its host.

This hyphal growth can occur in two different ways within Globisporangium sylvaticum, asexually or sexually.

During its asexual life cycle the pathogen produces sporangium that occur terminally and intercalary, and are globose and thin walled in shape as well as sub-globose and lemon shaped, respectively. After a period of time biflagellate zoospores begin to develop within the protoplasm of the sporangium and are subsequently released during the proper conditions. The motile zoospores proliferate through the vector medium until they reach the infection court of its host, in this case the seed or the roots. Once at the infection court, the zoospores encyst themselves on the root tips or seed of the host thereby infecting it and resulting in the occurrence of more mycelial growth and the eventual damping off/ root rot of the host plant.

However, during the sexual lifecycle the pathogen, as previously mentioned, needs two different compatible isolates to form a diploid structure called an oospore. The oospore is a survival structure for the pathogen which only germinates during non-adverse conditions. In the case of Globisporangium sylvaticum, the oospore is globose, aplerotic(space between oospore wall and oogonium wall) and thick walled. The formation of the oospore is caused by the fusion of an antheridia and an oogonium, the male and female reproductive parts, respectively. The antheridia in Globisporangium sylvaticum is characterized as being diclinous and branched while the oogonia are intercalary and sub-globose. After an oospore is formed as a result of the fusion between the aforementioned reproductive structures the pathogen continues to undergo cell division giving rise to the mycelium where both cycles repeat under the proper conditions.

== Environment ==
A moist environment is required for the propagation and dispersal of Globisporangium sylvaticum. The pathogen produces highly motile zoospores, which use flagella for locomotion. In the presence of water, the zoospore will use its flagella to propel itself through the surrounding water, in the direction of a prospective infection court. In adverse environmental conditions, the pathogen exists in a structure called an oospore. This structure protects the pathogen for extended periods until conditions for its propagation are satisfied. Additionally, during ideal temperature conditions, it has been observed that optimal radial growth for Globisporangium sylvaticum occurs between 28 °C and 30 °C. During this temperature range the pathogen has been observed to grow 2.7 cm over a 24-hour period.
