= Rice yellow mottle virus =

Virus classification
- (unranked): Virus
- Realm: Riboviria
- Kingdom: Orthornavirae
- Phylum: Pisuviricota
- Class: Pisoniviricetes
- Order: Sobelivirales
- Family: Solemoviridae
- Genus: Sobemovirus
- Species: Sobemovirus RYMV

Synonyms
- rice yellow mottle sobemovirus; pale yellow mottle disease

Species of virus

Rice yellow mottle virus (RYMV) is a plant pathogenic virus, belonging to the genus Sobemovirus. The genome is a positive-sense single strand RNA of 4450 nucleotides in length and is not polyadenylated. It was first reported in Kenya in 1966 in one of Africa's first cultivation intensification schemes, due to RYMV's association with intensification, (Note: p. 7, "RYMV was first detected in 1966 near Kisumu in Kenya along the north-east shore of Lake Victoria [21]. This report coincided with the development of one of the first major intensive rice production schemes in Africa. Since then, most epidemics have been associated with rice intensificiation.") but DNA analysis of its evolutionary history shows it to have evolved in East Africa in the 19th century. (Note: Abstract, "Diversification and spread of RYMV has been concomitant with an extension of rice cultivation in Africa since the 19th century.") (Note: Abstract, "In East Africa, RYMV emerged in the 19^{th} century after rice intensification along the Indian Ocean coast, and later spread inland concomitantly with rice introduction.") (Note: p. 9, "The pattern of genetic diversity of RYMV has been interpreted as resulting from a concomitant diversification and spread of the virus from East to West Africa since the 19th century [19]. It is shown here that, at a finer scale of spatial resolution, the geographic distribution of the strains has been shaped by the history of rice cultivation in Africa.") Since its identification in Kenya it has been detected in many countries in sub-Saharan Africa. It has also been detected in Central Africa, but has yet to be seen outside the continent. The genomic organization of RYMV is most similar to that of Cocksfoot mottle virus. RYMV is one of the better-studied plant-virus pathosystems. (Note: p. 258-9, "The RYMV — rice pathosystem is one of the few plant-virus pathosystems to have been subjected to detailed studies involving both field and molecular epidemiology.")

== Virology ==
=== Structure ===
RYMV is a single-stranded positive-sense RNA virus. There is a high level of genetic diversity with the RYMV nucleotides, which is roughly 14%. RYMV is a sobemovirus.

=== Impact on plants ===
RYMV has a massive impact on rice crops. Streaking, mottling, discoloration and malformation of leaves as well as death of infected young plants are all typical signs of RYMV infection. Crop losses can be 25–100%. It is believed that RYMV has begun to spread since the introduction of the exotic rice (Oryza sativa) from Asia into the African continent. Indigenous rices that are from the African area tend to be more tolerant of the virus. The natural host of the virus tends to remain in the Oryzeae tribe of plants. The virus only impacts a few plant species, including certain rice species and wild grasses. The only way for plants to be confirmed of having RYMV is by performing a serological test.

=== Symptoms of infection ===
Younger seedlings (3–4 leaf growth stage) are the most susceptible – older plants generally exhibit less obvious foliar symptoms and less stunting than younger siblings. Symptoms appear initially as yellow-green linear spots on the base of the youngest leaves. As the infection grows the spots expand parallel to leaf veins and appear as yellow or orange streaks; these can vary in width, but can be continuous up to 10 cm.

In the early stages of the crop, affected plants exhibit yellow or organge leaves. In severe cases,the foliage rolls upward and dries out. Other symptoms are stunting, reduced tillering and poor panicle filling. This results in low or no seed production and poor grain quality.

=== Transmission ===
RYMV located in the rice husks in the plants. The virus is transmissible by animals, by wind-mediated leaf contact, and by abiotic factors (e.g. irrigation water). It can be transmitted by leaf beetles or rats, or from plant to plant through leaf debris, empty rice spikelets, intertwining roots, leaf contact, rice stubble, contaminated hands, and from closely spaced plants. This virus is not seed-borne, nor is it transmitted by nematodes. Long-horned grasshoppers (Conocephalus) were found to be a possible vector of RYMV in Uganda.

=== Adaptability and resistance ===
A few rice cultivars exhibit a high resistance to RYMV characterized by an absence of symptoms and no viral detection. The inheritance of this high resistance is recessive. The resistance gene RYMV1 was identified as an eIF(iso)4G gene. Four rymv1 resistance alleles have been characterized, one in O. sativa (rymv1-2) and three in O. glaberrima cultivars (rymv1-3, rymv1-4, rymv1-5). Resistance of rymv1–3 is caused by a deletion of codons 322–324 in the same domain of eIF(iso)4G.

== Management ==
=== Prevention ===
Resistant and tolerant varieties are available.

Using nursery sites which haven't been infected previously or direct sowing in the field can also help prevent the spread of the virus.

CABI recommends planting the crop as early as possible can avoid the peak period of insect vectors of the virus. In addition, synchronising the planting in different fields can prevent the virus from spreading to younger crops.

Maintaining weeds to control other hosts of the virus and clearing bushes around fields to control breeding sites for insect vectors can also prevent RYMV spread.

Sanitation procedures can reduce the spread of RYMV. CABI recommends cleaning weeds from irrigation canals and around rice fields, especially during the off season, to remove the virus and its insect vectors will remove the virus and insect vectors. Cleaning of farm machinery can reduce spread prevent mechanical spread. This also applies to cleaning any farm machinery after each use.

=== Control ===
RYMV will completely kill susceptible varieties; if detected, removing infected plants and destroying them can prevent further spread. It has also been recommended by CABI to reduce the application of fertiliser on infected plants.

There are no chemical control methods to directly stop the spread of RYMV. However, there are available insecticides to control vectors of the virus in some countries; suitable chemicals vary depending on country specific guidelines.

== Sources ==
This article incorporates text from a free content work. Licensed under CC-BY-SA (license statement/permission). Text taken from Plantwise Factsheets for Farmers: Resistant rice against rice yellow mottle virus, Jubilant JN Mwangi, Edith D. Kija Mariam I. Mziray, CABI.

This article incorporates text from a free content work. Licensed under CC-BY-SA (license statement/permission). Text taken from PMDG: Green List - Rice Yellow Mottle Virus, Plantwise, CABI.

This article incorporates text from a free content work. Licensed under CC-BY-SA (license statement/permission). Text taken from Plantwise Factsheets for Farmers: Rice yellow mottle (Ikivejuru), Joelle Kajuga, Germain Nkima, CABI.

This article incorporates text from a free content work. Licensed under CC-BY-SA (license statement/permission). Text taken from PMDG: Rice Yellow Mottle virus - Rwanda, J. Chrysostome Muhigirwa & Germain Nkima, CABI.

This article incorporates text from a free content work. Licensed under CC-BY-SA (license statement/permission). Text taken from PMDG: Rice Yellow Mottle Virus - Malawi, Chilasa S.L, J.I.G. Masangwa, Shaibu Y.A., CABI.

This article incorporates text from a free content work. Licensed under CC-BY-SA (license statement/permission). Text taken from PMDG: Rice Yellow Mottle Virus - Ghana, E. Moses, F. C. Brentu & F.A. Nyarko, CABI.
