= Turnip rosette virus =

- Arabidopsis thaliana Col-0 (left) and dcl234 mutants (right). Top: mock-inoculated controls. Bottom: TRoV-infected plants showing smaller rosettes, curled leaves, and yellowing.

Virus classification
- (unranked): Virus
- Realm: Riboviria
- Kingdom: Orthornavirae
- Phylum: Pisuviricota
- Class: Pisoniviricetes
- Order: Sobelivirales
- Family: Solemoviridae
- Genus: Sobemovirus
- Species: Sobemovirus trov

Plant virus

Turnip rosette virus (TRoV) is a plant virus belonging to the genus Sobemovirus. It was first reported in Scotland in 1954 in Brassica rapa, but it was not until 1958 that the symptoms were attributed to TRoV. Common symptoms of TRoV infection include stunting, rosetting, and mottling. However, depending on the host species, dwarfism, necrosis, and purple foliage may also occur. Because these symptoms can resemble those caused by Turnip mosaic virus (TuMV) or Turnip crinkle virus (TCV), determining the global distribution of TRoV is challenging. TRoV is transmitted by leaf-feeding beetles, with transmission characterized by a short retention period of the virus in its vectors. Other vector groups, such as aphids, mirid bugs, and grasshoppers, have been reported for some members of the genus Sobemovirus, but their role in TRoV transmission has not been established.

== Structure and genome ==
Although the genome of TRoV has not been characterized in detail, members of the genus Sobemovirus generally possess an icosahedral capsid and a compact, polycistronic, positive-sense single-stranded RNA (+ssRNA) genome of approximately 4.0–4.5 kilobases.
