= Sowbane mosaic virus =

Virus classification
- (unranked): Virus
- Realm: Riboviria
- Kingdom: Orthornavirae
- Phylum: Pisuviricota
- Class: Pisoniviricetes
- Order: Sobelivirales
- Family: Solemoviridae
- Genus: Sobemovirus
- Species: Sobemovirus SOMV

Synonyms
- Apple latent virus 2 Chenopodium mosaic virus Chenopodium seed-borne mosaic virus Chenopodium star mottle virus

Species of virus

Sowbane mosaic virus (SoMV) is a pathogenic plant virus, infecting potato and grapevine. Infected species present chlorotic mottling and lesions, followed by yellow flecking and star-shaped patterns.
