= Polemovirus =

Virus classification
- (unranked): Virus
- Realm: Riboviria
- Kingdom: Orthornavirae
- Phylum: Pisuviricota
- Class: Pisoniviricetes
- Order: Sobelivirales
- Family: Solemoviridae
- Genus: Polemovirus
- Species: Polemovirus PNLV

Synonyms
- Poinsettia cryptic virus; Poinsettia latent virus

Genus of viruses

Polemovirus is a genus of viruses. Commercial cultivars of Euphorbia pulcherrima serve as natural hosts. There is only one species in this genus: Poinsettia latent virus (Polemovirus PNLV). Its RNA suggests a replication mode like that of poleroviruses, whereas the coat protein sequence is closely related to that of sobemoviruses.

== Structure ==
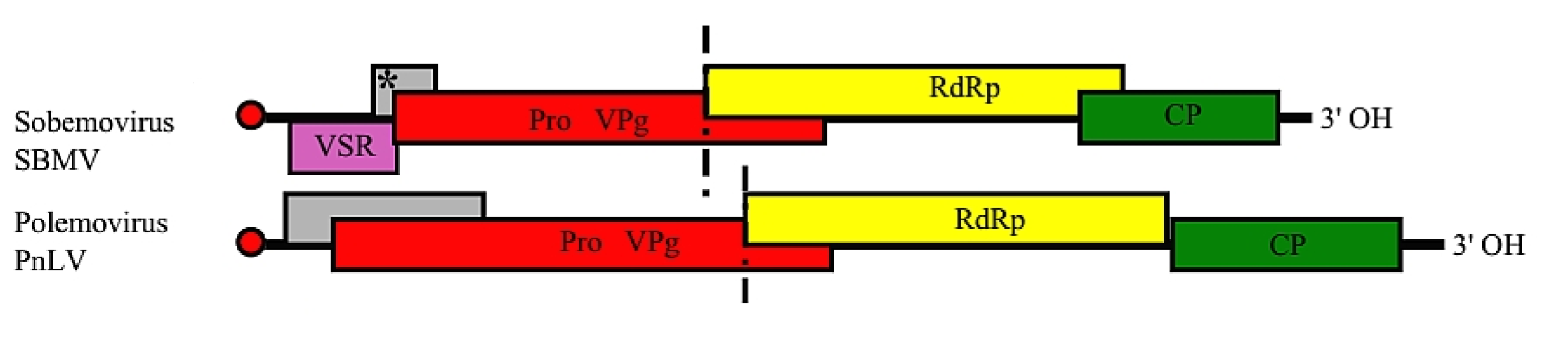
Genome of Southern bean mosaic virus (SBMV) and Poinsettia latent virus (PnLV)

Viruses in Polemovirus are non-enveloped, with icosahedral geometries, and T=3 symmetry. Genomes are linear and non-segmented.

Genus	Structure	Symmetry	Capsid	Genomic arrangement	Genomic segmentation
Polemovirus	Icosahedral	T=3	Non-enveloped	Linear	Monopartite

== Life cycle ==
Viral replication is cytoplasmic, and is lysogenic. Entry into the host cell is achieved by penetration into the host cell. Replication follows the positive stranded RNA virus replication model. Positive stranded RNA virus transcription is the method of transcription. The virus exits the host cell by tubule-guided viral movement. Commercial cultivars of Euphorbia pulcherrima serve as the natural host.

Genus	Host details	Tissue tropism	Entry details	Release details	Replication site	Assembly site	Transmission
Polemovirus	Plants	None	Penetration	Viral Movement	Cytoplasm	Cytoplasm	Unknown
