= Cuisine of Vermont =

Culinary traditions of Vermont, United States

The Cuisine of Vermont is part of the cuisine of New England of the Northeastern United States.

== Customs and traditions ==
In the farmhouses of the Vermont countryside the custom persists of serving dinner at noon, to nourish men who wake early and work through the afternoon, however in larger towns, where professions do not demand the same physical labor, the modern custom of a lighter lunch and hearty evening meal accommodates the office lifestyle.

== Characteristics ==
Pancakes topped with locally produced maple syrup, are the typical Vermont breakfast, served with a side of local bacon.

Homemakers make all kinds of fruit and vegetable pickles.

Vermont is known for its local cheeses. By 1983, dairy farms made up 79% of all farm profits in the state. In 1995, that share had decreased to 69.9%.

Blueberries grow wild in the woods, and cultivated blueberries are grown locally. Fiddleheads are gathered seasonally along streams and riverbanks. There can be sauteed or simply pickled, or used in more innovative, modern dishes.

Lamb dishes are more common in Vermont, where lambs are still raised for meat by some local farmers, than in other parts of the country.

An important and growing part of Vermont's economy is the manufacture and sale of artisan and fancy foods, trading in part upon the Vermont "brand," which the state manages and defends. Examples of these specialty exports include Cabot Cheese, Vermont Butter and Cheese Company, several microbreweries, ginseng growers, King Arthur Flour, and Ben and Jerry's Ice Cream.

The official "state flavor" of Vermont is maple from the sugar maple tree. The "state fruit" is apple, and the state pie is apple pie. Per statute, when serving apple pie in Vermont, a "good faith" effort should be made to serve it with milk, cheddar cheese, or vanilla ice cream.
