= Indonesian soybean dwarf virus =

Virus classification
- (unranked): Virus
- Realm: Riboviria
- Kingdom: Orthornavirae
- Phylum: Pisuviricota
- Class: Pisoniviricetes
- Order: Sobelivirales
- Family: Solemoviridae
- Virus: Indonesian soybean dwarf virus

Indonesian soybean dwarf virus is a viral infectious disease transmitted by aphids to soybean plants also endemic to areas of the United States.

== Research ==
Many experiments on the incidence and hosts of soybean dwarf virus in United States populations of clover and other forage legumes have been conducted by various Universities, notably the University of Illinois.
