= Cocksfoot mottle virus =

Virus classification
- (unranked): Virus
- Realm: Riboviria
- Kingdom: Orthornavirae
- Phylum: Pisuviricota
- Class: Pisoniviricetes
- Order: Sobelivirales
- Family: Solemoviridae
- Genus: Sobemovirus
- Species: Sobemovirus CFMV

Synonyms
- Cocksfoot necrotic mosaic virus

Species of virus

Cocksfoot mottle virus (CfMV) is a pathogenic plant virus belonging to the genus Sobemovirus. The virus appears in southern and central England. It is transmitted by beetles Lema melanopa and Lema lichenis and is common in crops of cocksfoot and cocksfoot/legume mixtures.

== Molecular biology ==
CfMV's P1 protein, required for infection, has been found to interfere with RNAi pathways in plants species such as Nicotiana benthamiana and Nicotiana tabacum.

The polyprotein coat of CfMV is made up of two proteins, encoded by overlapping open reading frames (2a and 2b) which are transcribed through a ribosomal frameshift mechanism. This mechanism is reliant upon a small stem-loop structure and a 'slippery' repeat sequence which allows programmed ribosomal frameshifting.
