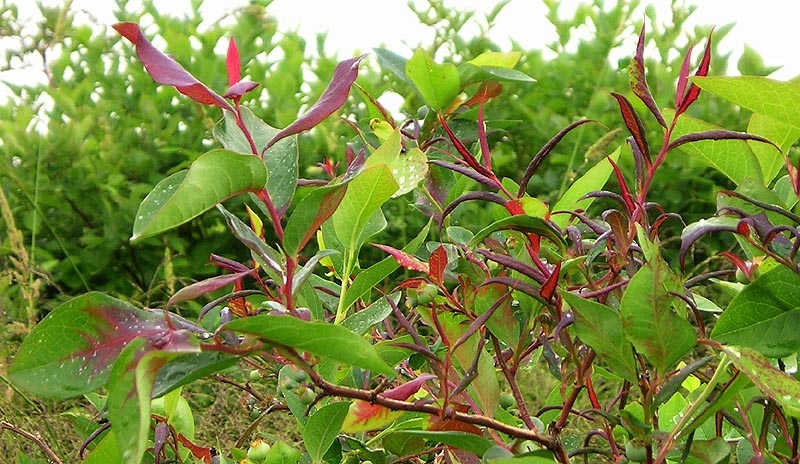
- Reddish-purple coloration and strap-like leaf shape caused by BBSSV disease

Virus classification
- (unranked): Virus
- Realm: Riboviria
- Kingdom: Orthornavirae
- Phylum: Pisuviricota
- Class: Pisoniviricetes
- Order: Sobelivirales
- Family: Solemoviridae
- Genus: Sobemovirus
- Species: Sobemovirus BSSV

= Blueberry shoestring virus =

Species of virus

Blueberry shoestring virus (BBSSV) is a disease-causing virus that is commonly transmitted by the aphid vector Illinoia pepperi. The blueberry shoestring virus disease is very prominent in highbush and lowbush blueberry plants in the northeastern and upper Midwest of the United States. Symptoms can vary significantly depending on the environment, but the most common disease symptoms are reddish streaking on young stems, reduced vigor and strap-shaped leaves. The blueberry shoestring virus disease can be managed by eliminating the aphid vector through the use of biological, chemical or cultural controls. In severe cases, the disease leads to an extensive loss of yield and marketable fruit.

== Hosts and symptoms ==
The only known plant hosts of blueberry shoestring virus are highbush blueberry, Vaccinium corymbosum, and lowbush blueberry, Vaccinium angustifolium, plants. The highbush host cultivars include Blueray, Burlington, Coville, Earliblue, Elliot, Jersey, June, Rancocas, Rubel and Weymouth. The Jersey, Elliot, and Blueray cultivars are particularly susceptible. When infected, these blueberry plants become stunted in growth. A common symptom that is present in infected plants is elongated reddish streaking on the stems, which is the most common visual diagnostic of BBSSV. Other common symptoms include red vein-banding on the leaf, which form a red oak-leaf like pattern, and a red-purple discoloration on undeveloped berries. The berries remain discolored and do not turn blue. The flowers of infected blueberry plants may have a pink tinge or reddish streaks on the petals. As the severity of the disease increases, the leaves become crescent-shaped, and the yield production of blueberries is reduced. However, the latency period (time between infection and symptom expression) of BBSSV can last as long as 4 years, which makes it difficult to distinguish between healthy and infected blueberry plants.

== Disease cycle ==
There are several species of blueberry aphids that colonize blueberry bushes. The most damaging blueberry aphid species are those that vector and transmit the viral particles that cause blueberry shoestring virus. Adult blueberry aphids have a light green thorax and abdomen with darker legs and antennae. The cornicles, a distinguishing feature of aphids, are located towards the rear of the body and contain a dark brown tip.

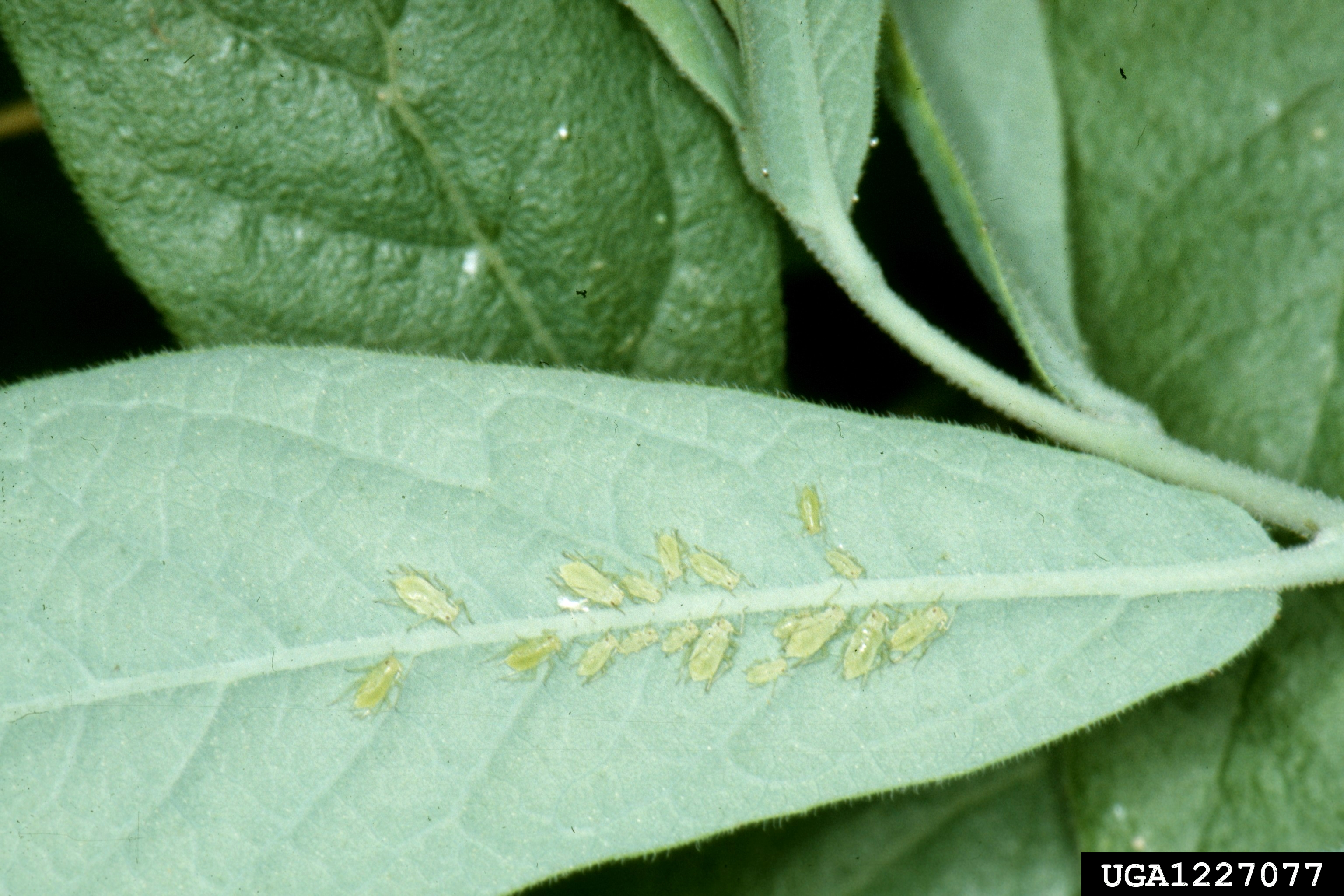
Blueberry aphid, Illinoia pepperi, colony on a leaf of a blueberry bush.

=== Aphid life cycle ===
The blueberry shoestring virus is vectored by the blueberry aphid, Illinoia pepperi. During the winter, blueberry aphids overwinter as tiny eggs at the bases of buds. In the Spring, when young foliage begins to develop, which is usually during bloom, eggs begin to hatch and young aphids move in search for a place to feed. The ideal temperature for the eggs to hatch is around 38 °F [3.3 °C]. Once the aphids are mature, they are able to reproduce sexually and asexually (females produce offspring without mating). As a response to crowding in the growing colonies, wings begin to develop on the aphids. Although most aphid movement is within the same blueberry plant, winged aphids have the ability to fly onto other blueberry plants and infect them. In the fall, the male and female aphids mate and the eggs are laid on buds on the new plant growth where they overwinter until the spring.

=== Virus transmission ===
The pathogen that causes blueberry shoestring virus is a single-stranded RNA virus with isometric particles that are 27 nanometers in diameter. Aphids obtain viral particles from diseased plants by inserting their stylet into the stem. The viral particles can be transmitted to healthy plants through aphid saliva for up to 10 days after feeding on an infected plant and it has been found that aphid hemolymph (blood-like fluid) contains virus particles, which indicates that the virus circulates within the insect. The blueberry shoestring plant virus causes a systemic infection of the blueberry plant. Virus particles are transmitted primarily through the phloem, but research by Urban et al has shown that the virus is able to travel through the xylem, in the form of plant sap, and it is found in all plant tissues, such as the parenchymatous tissue, as well. Symptoms may not be visible until up to 4 years after initial infection, which causes complications with disease detection.

== Environment ==
Blueberry shoestring virus is a widespread disease of blueberries in Michigan and New Jersey, but it has also been detected in Washington, North Carolina, and Oregon. It has also been found in lowbush blueberry in Nova Scotia and New Brunswick, Canada. The disease has not been reported from other parts of the world. The blueberry aphids overwinter as tiny eggs at the bases of the buds of the blueberry plant. Once young foliage has begun to develop, the young aphids will search for a place to feed and may move between adjacent plants. Aphid colonies reproduce most quickly on fast-growing young shoots so it is important to avoid over fertilization. The spread of the pathogen towards the south is limited because the vector, I. pepperi, is not found in warm regions since the optimal temperature for blueberry aphid eggs to hatch is around 38 °F [3.3 °C].

== Management ==
One way to reduce the virus and infection risk is through aphid management. Aphids are typically found on the undersides of leaves on the lower succulent shoots. After bloom, the lower shoots should be inspected weekly in multiple areas of the field. Wingless aphids are found early in the growing season while later in the season, the colonies will be made up of both wingless and winged aphids. Aphids have multiple natural predators, which growers rely on to naturally control the aphid population, such as parasitic wasps, Aphidius spp., as well as the seven spotted lady beetle, Coccinella septempunctata. The parasitic wasps lay their eggs inside of aphids and the larvae then consume the aphids from the inside. These parasitic predators also attack the aphid eggs. When growing blueberries, it is important to only use certified virus-free planting material. In order to detect the presence of the virus, enzyme-linked immunosorbent assay (ELISA) readily detects the virus in infected leaves, blossoms, and fruit bud tissues. ELISA kits are commercially available for growers testing their potentially infected blueberry bushes. When transferring plants from an infected field to a healthy field it is important to wash the plants with water to remove virus-carrying aphids and prevent the spread of the disease to other areas. For chemical management of the disease, optimal aphid control insecticides are Provado, Actara or Assail. These insecticides belong to the neonicotinoid class and are able to spread in the foliage after application. Studies have shown that infection can be spread by rubbing viral particles on the leaves of healthy blueberry plants so it is important to immediately remove and dispose of infected plant material once infection has been detected. There is no single common way to control the spread of the blueberry shoestring virus. The management option used depends on the severity of the disease and the population density of the aphid vector.

== Importance ==
Blueberry shoestring virus is a devastating disease because once a plant is infected there is no cure. This virus has been detected in northeastern and upper Midwest states such as Michigan, New Jersey, North Carolina, and Washington. Blueberries are native to Michigan and for the past 100 years it has been the nations leading producer of blueberries, but due to reduced yield and bush decline caused by the blueberry shoestring virus it has experienced annual losses of nearly 3 million dollars.

Over the past few years there has been a major shift and expansion in blueberry production and now many different countries, such as Canada and Switzerland, are cultivating fields to join the blueberry industry. Many countries do not have certification programs to safeguard the blueberry industry, which raises concerns because it may lead to the introduction of existing blueberry viral diseases to new regions of the world. Once a virus is introduced to a new area it can cost growers tens of millions of dollars to eradicate the viral pathogen. If the blueberry industry is to survive, quality controls will have to become a priority to limit the spread of blueberry viruses, especially those that can be transmitted through vectors.
