= Cultivated blueberries =

Human-developed varieties of blueberries

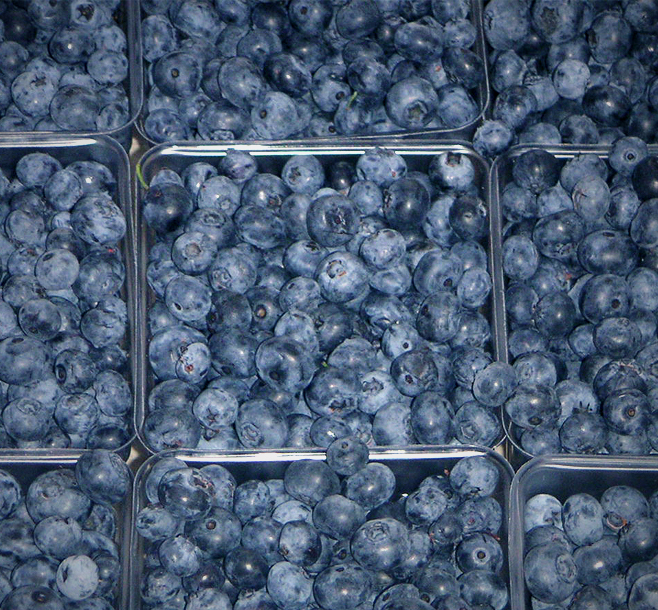
Cultivated blueberries in sales trays

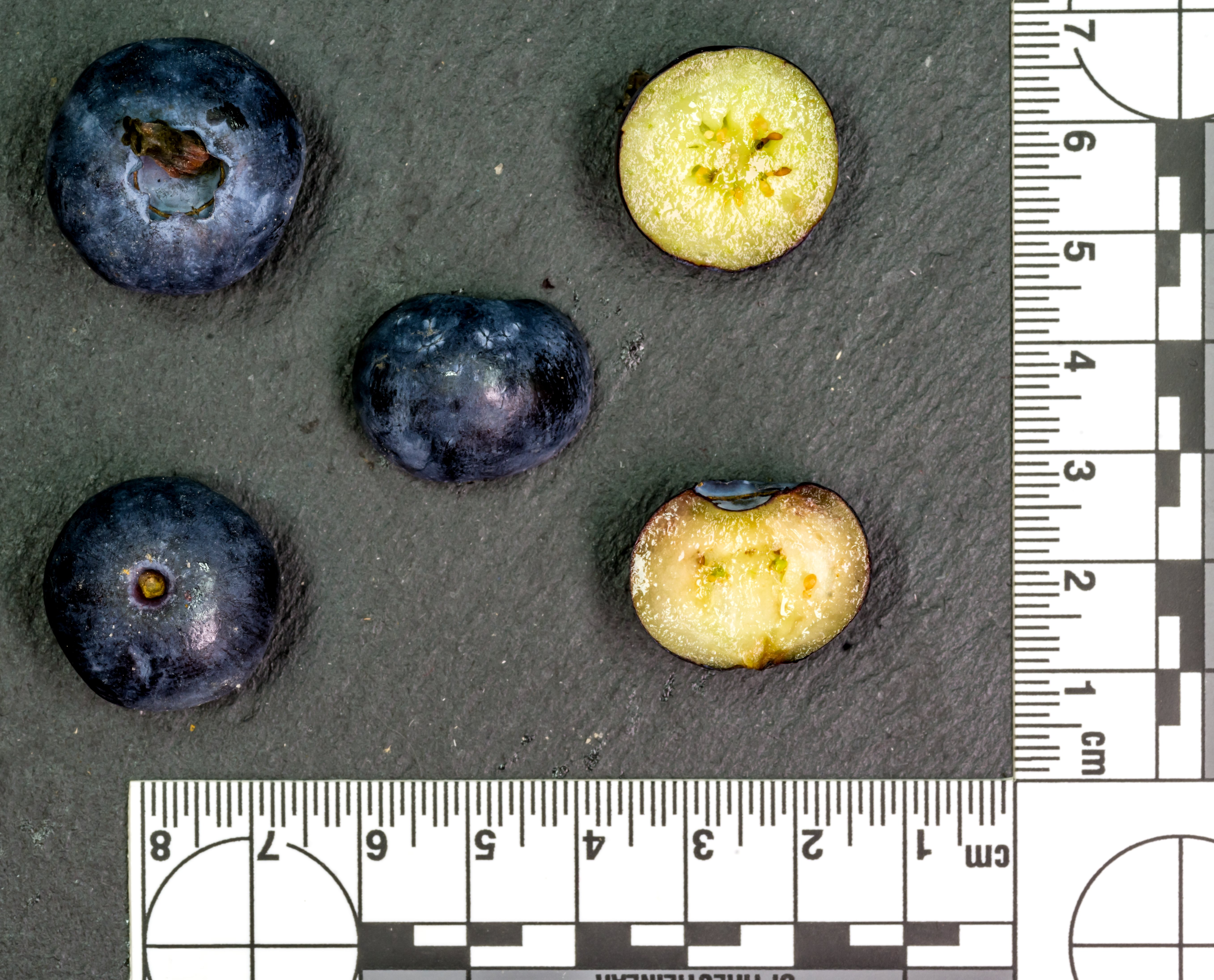
Cross-section through cultivated blueberries

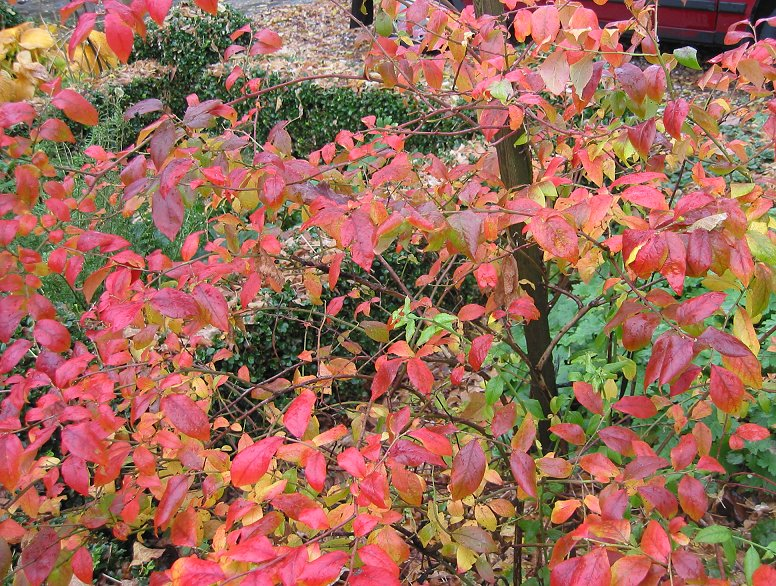
Typical autumn coloration of blueberry bushes

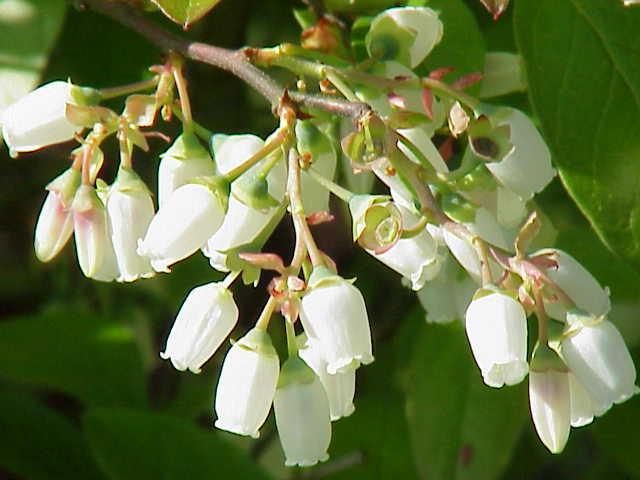
Urn-shaped flowers of cultivated blueberries

The cultivated blueberry encompasses a wide variety of cultivars developed through plant breeding from plant species of the subgenus or section Cyanococcus within the genus Vaccinium. Blueberries belong to the plant family Ericaceae. Contrary to common assumption, cultivated blueberries do not descend from the European bilberry, blueberry, or whortleberry (Vaccinium myrtillus), whose fruits stain the mouth and lips blue when eaten, but originate from North America. The coloring anthocyanins are located in the skin of the nearly spherical, blue berries; their flesh is light-colored.

Since the beginning of the 20th century, over 100 new cultivars have been developed. Cultivated blueberries are of global importance as market fruits. Before their cultivation as a fruit supplier, the cultivated blueberry had already been introduced in European landscape architecture as an ornamental plant due to its decorative autumn coloration.

== Botanical description ==
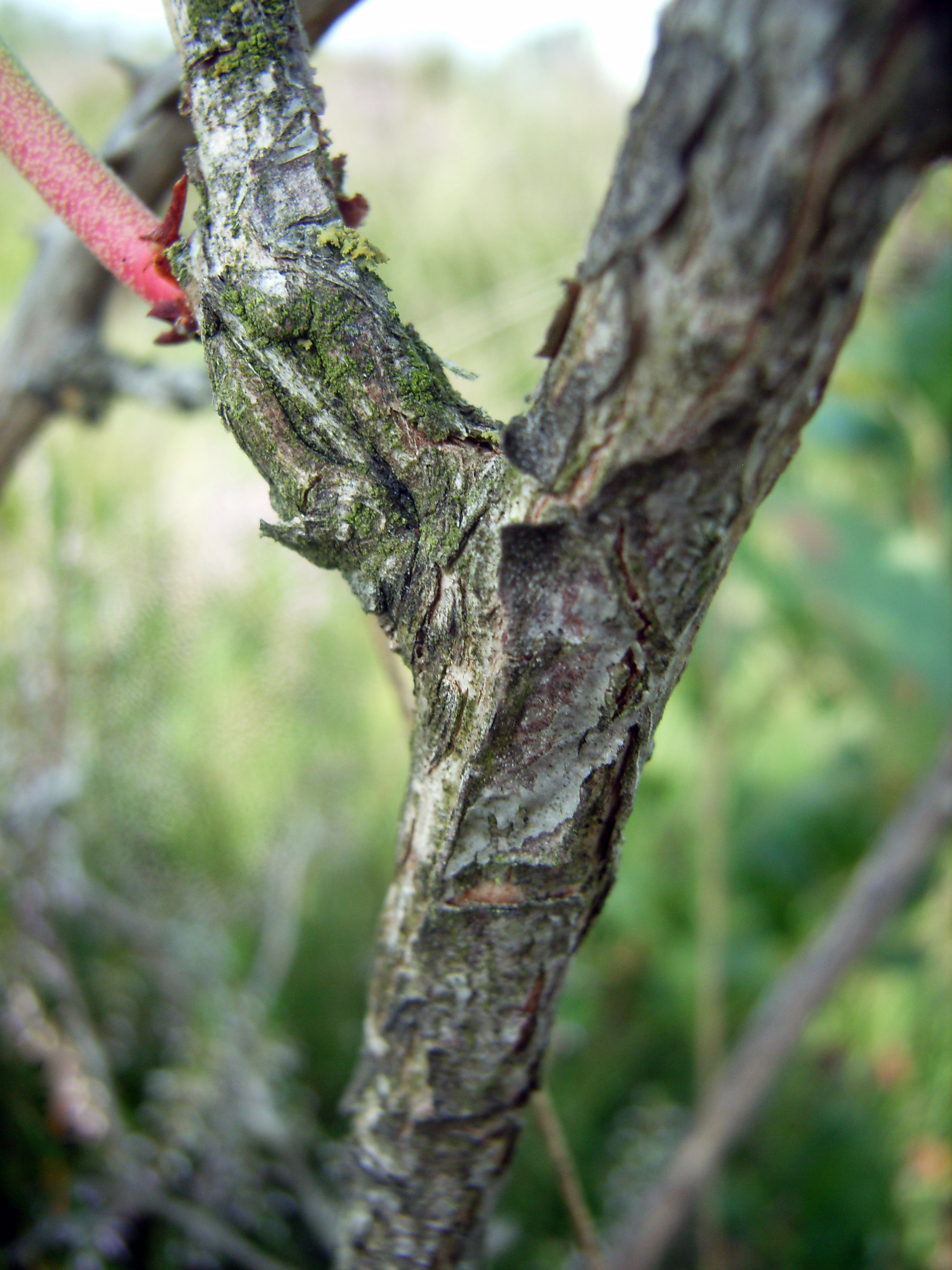
Bark of older shoots

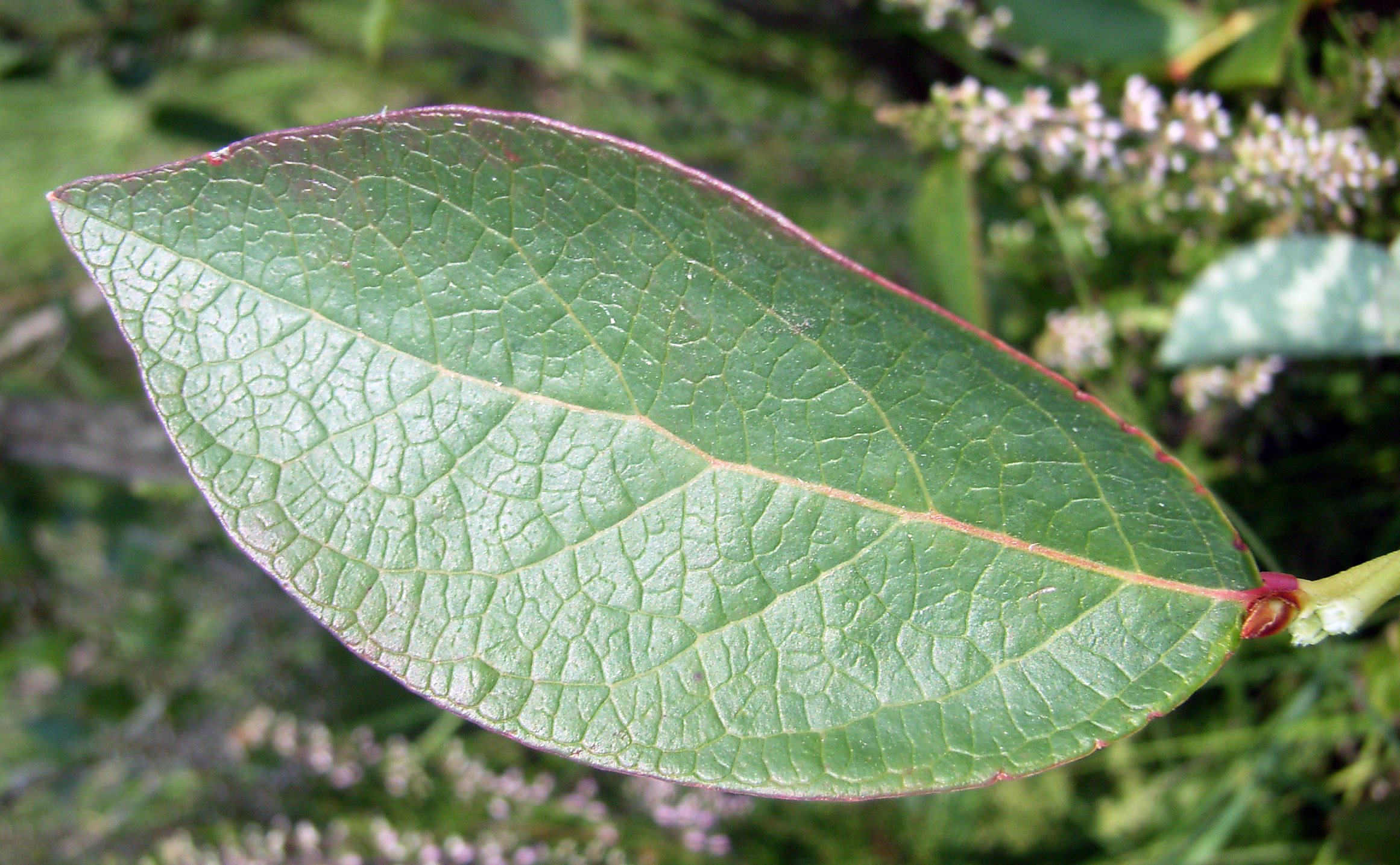
Upper side of leaf

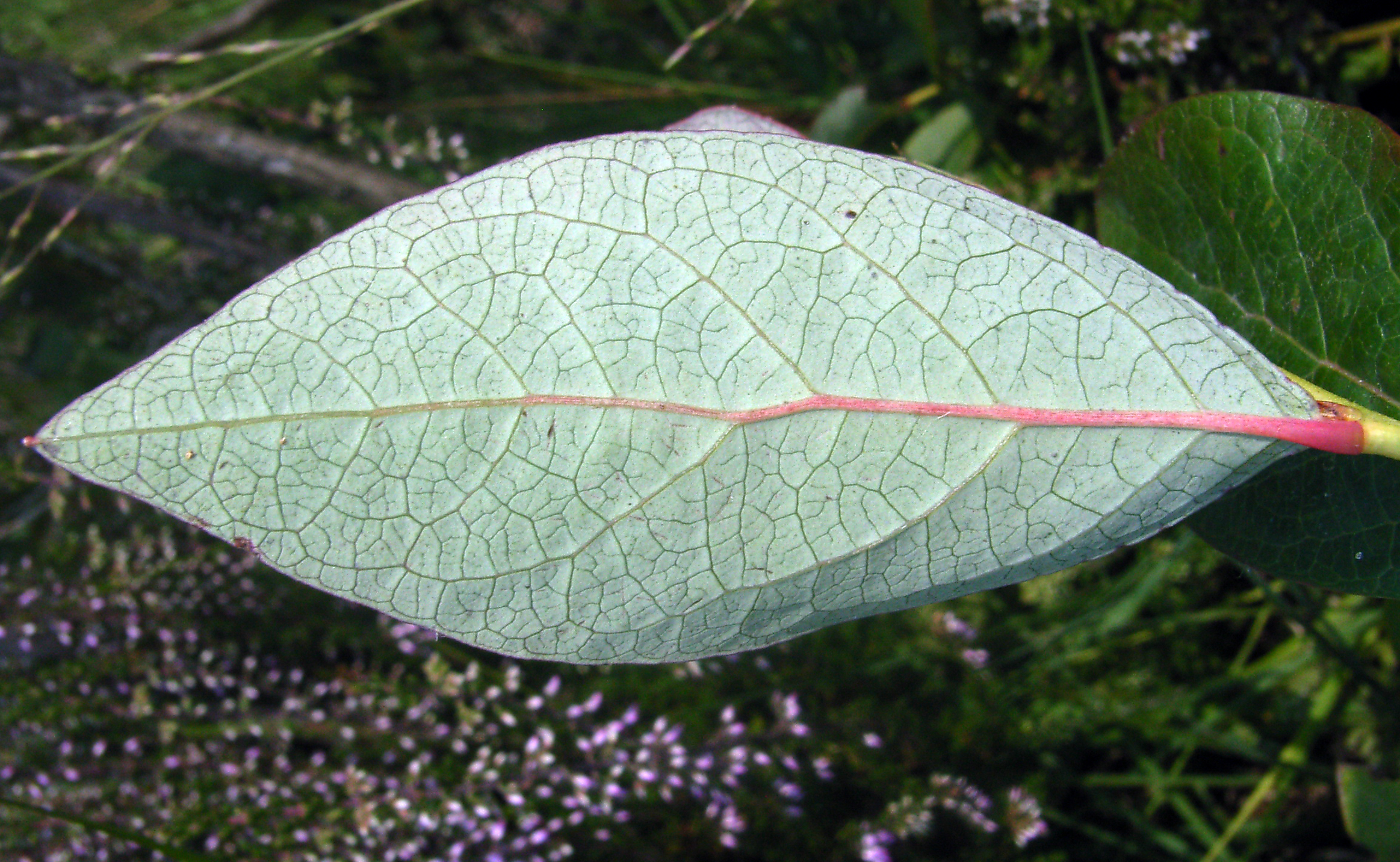
Under side of leaf

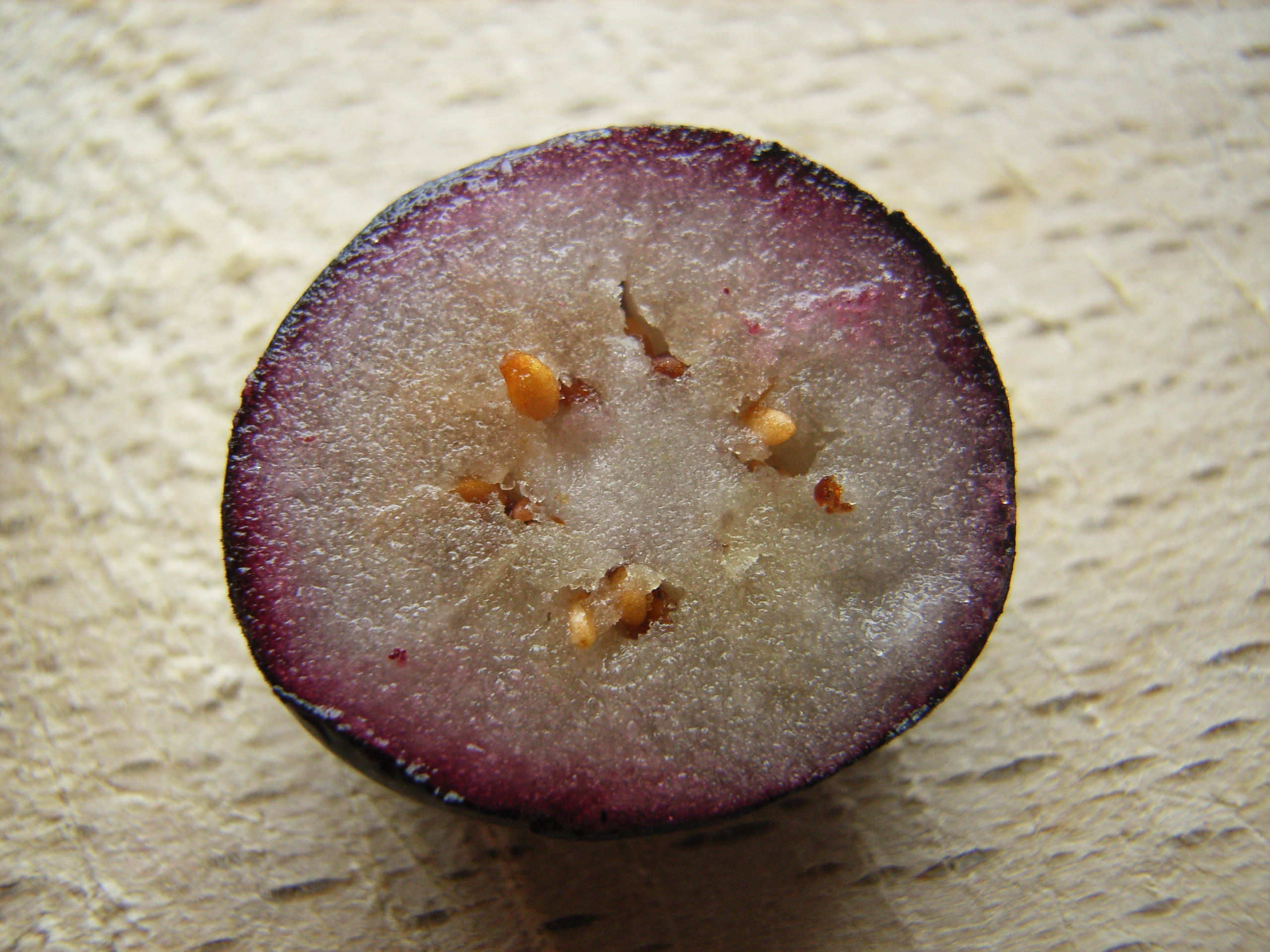
Cut-open berry with light brown seeds; the cells are destroyed by freezing. Therefore, the anthocyanins from the skin have run into the flesh upon thawing.

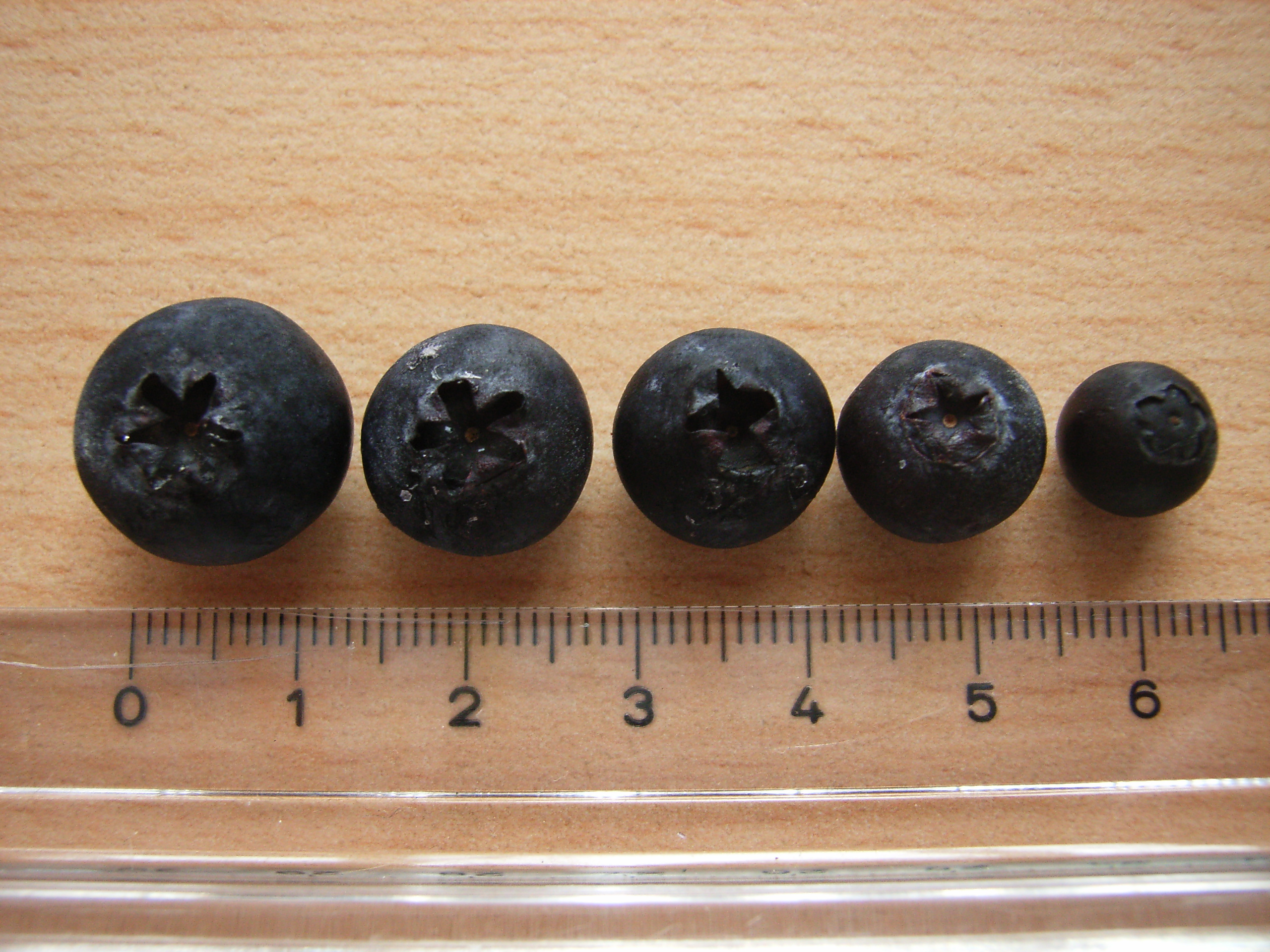
Various berry sizes of feral forms

Cultivated blueberries are perennial, upright-growing, highly branched, deciduous subshrubs (chamaephytes). They can reach heights of several meters or grow as ground covers with only a few centimeters in height. Characteristic are urn-shaped flowers and blue, bloomy berries.

=== Growth forms and root system ===
The habit of cultivated blueberries varies from cultivar to cultivar. While some selections grow strictly upright, others spread wider and form an expansive shape. The group of highbush forms (Northern and Southern Highbush Blueberries) form 2 to 5 meter tall, rounded, dense, and compact bushes. The upright cultivars of rabbiteye blueberries (Rabbiteye Blueberries) reach about 4 meters, half-high forms (Half-Highbush Blueberries) between 1 and 2 meters. The lowbush cultivars (Lowbush Blueberries) grow between 0.2 and 0.7 meters tall and form runners. They grow more loosely than the highbush and half-highbush forms. The main plant mass in these consists of rhizomes, from which the upright shoots grow.

The root system runs highly branched and shallowly spread out. It has a high proportion of partly matted fine roots. They are fibrous and very thin and, unlike other plants, not equipped with root hairs, which are important for the uptake of water and nutrients.

=== Leaves and shoots ===
The wood of the shoots is hard and brittle, the bark gray and cracked. Depending on the cultivar, they branch more or less strongly. Young shoots are usually hairless, green to yellowish green, and partly flushed red (two-year-old shoots) with a warty surface.

The leaves are arranged alternately on the shoot. They are fresh to dark green and hairless on the upper side. On the underside, they are lighter colored and, at least on the venation, usually slightly hairy. Around mid-June, the bushes have developed their largest leaf area in the annual cycle. Before leaf fall in autumn, the leaves turn yellow to bright red due to the formation of anthocyanins. This gives cultivated blueberries a high ornamental value. The leaves of high to half-high cultivars are ovate to elongated oval, pointed with smooth leaf margins. Leaf size varies greatly on the bush. The leaves of lateral shoots usually do not exceed 5 to 6 cm, while those of vigorous basal shoots reach 10 cm and more. The foliage leaves of lowbush selections are smaller than those mentioned and usually more or less toothed at the margin.

=== Flowers, fruits, and seeds ===
The yellowish white to delicate pink flowers are urn-shaped. These up to 20 mm long and somewhat inflated flower tubes consist of five fused petals. Each flower has eight to ten stamens at the base of the calyx, which in turn surround a distinctly longer stigma. At the base of the calyx are the nectar-producing nectaries. The flower bud produces a raceme of up to twelve individual flowers. The lower flowers are longer stalked than the upper ones. Some cultivars develop several racemes from one flower bud. The flower buds appear mostly at the shoot tips, less at the shoot base. They are distinctly rounder and stronger than the small and pointed leaf buds. Cultivated blueberries flower predominantly on first-order lateral shoots. The inferior ovary is surrounded by five green sepals, which are visible on the ripe fruit as fleshy humps.

All cultivated blueberry cultivars share light blue, bright blue to black-blue fruit skins of the berries. The flesh is whitish. The berries bear a white bloom on the surface; this coating is caused by microscopically small wax particles formed in the fruit skin, transported outward with the respiratory water, and deposited there. Berry size varies widely depending on the cultivar, averaging between 5 and 12 mm in width, sometimes up to 30 mm.

The fruits contain 30 to 80 very small, light brown seeds. About 4000 seeds weigh 1 gram. They are already germination-capable at fruit maturity and do not require a prolonged cold period (vernalization). The radicle appears after about 14 to 35 days, the cotyledons after about 3 to 8 weeks.

== Growth and development ==
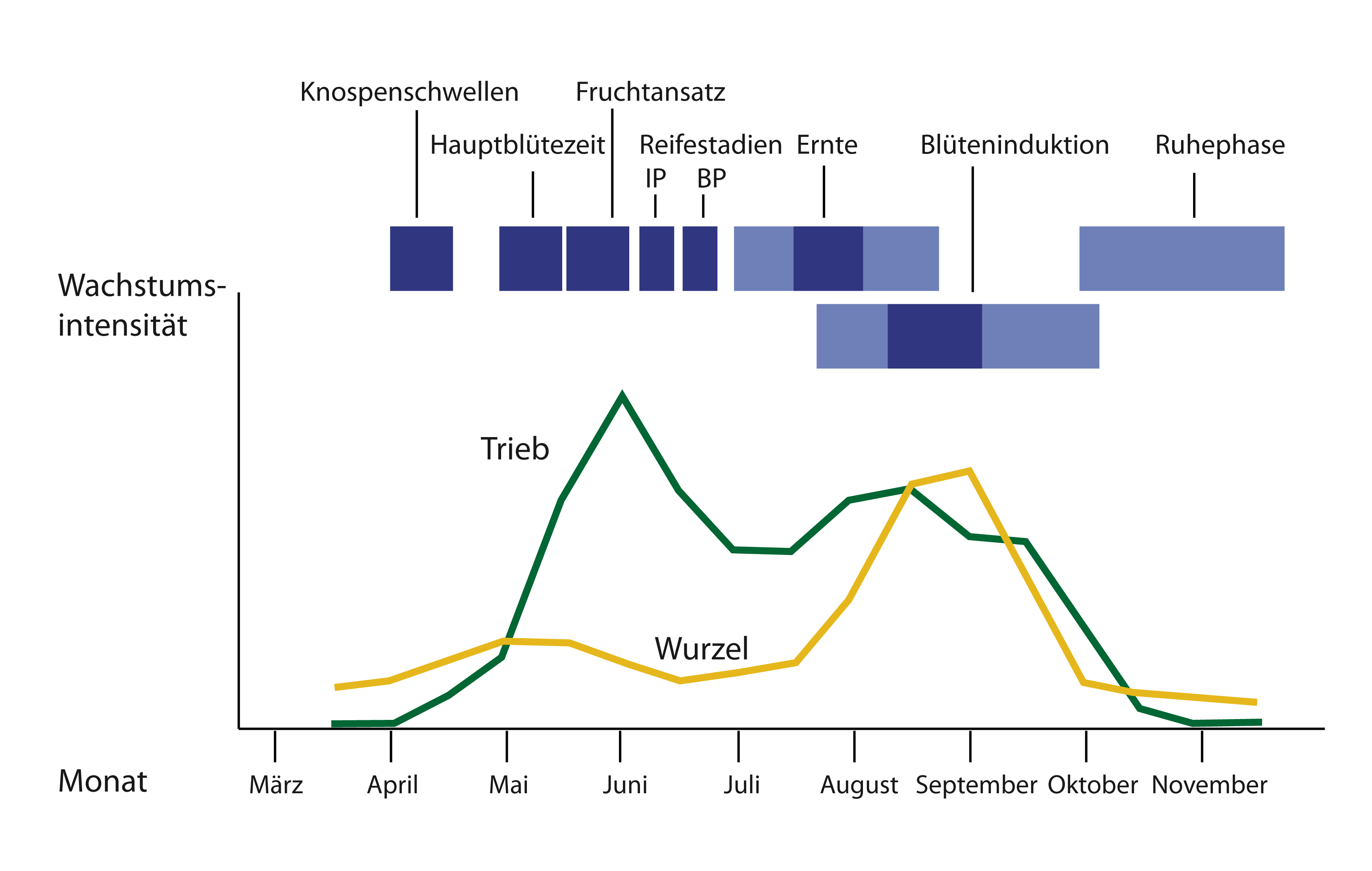
Temporal course of development of cultivated blueberry bushes in Central Europe

Vegetative growth, flowering, and fruit development extend in Central Europe over a period from about early April to mid-October. Harvesting occurs from early July to mid-August. Due to the large spatial extent of North American blueberry cultivation across various climate zones, harvesting there begins as early as April in Florida and ends late September in Newfoundland.

=== Vegetative growth ===
The main growth period of shoots is between mid-May and early October. The annual increment of the bushes and thus the yield performance decreases with increasing age, as flowers are mainly formed at the tips of one-year-old shoots. Flower and fruit set occur at the expense of shoot growth, so they become weaker and thinner with age; the bushes "senesce". The shoots have a cultivar-specific production period. In highbush forms, they form flowers and fruits for four years with good yield performance. Rabbiteye blueberry selections bear for seven years; in lowbush forms, the new shoots growing from the rootstock flower and fruit only in the second year. Although older shoots still produce fruits, these are usually smaller and the harvest remains low. Regular pruning is therefore one of the most important maintenance measures in blueberry cultivation. This promotes vegetative growth and stimulates new shoot formation from the bush base. Fruit size and quality are increased, and fruit ripening is accelerated. Removed are bearing wood, excess shoots, and inward-growing branches.

Root growth is strongest at soil temperatures between 14 and 18 °C, apparently significantly restricted below 8 °C. In cultivated blueberries, two phases of intense root growth occur. Under Central European climatic conditions, these are around mid-May to early June and from mid-August to mid-September. Since the root system is not particularly effective for water uptake, the bush stops growth when soil drying begins.

=== Flowering and fruit development ===
The flowers are initiated in Central Europe in the previous year after fruit ripening in a period between July and September (flower induction). In autumn, the flower buds grow and differentiate, so they are almost fully developed in winter. The main flowering of cultivated blueberries under Central European conditions is usually in the first two weeks of May and thus later than in North American growing areas. The flowering period extends over about four weeks, depending on weather. The flowers at the shoot tips open first, and within a flower cluster, always the upper ones first and then those closer to the ground.

Most blueberries are self-fertile. Through targeted cross-pollination, a larger fruit set with larger fruits and shorter ripening times can be achieved in cultivated forms. Southern highbush blueberries are only partially self-fertile and thus additionally dependent on cross-pollination. The rabbiteye blueberry group and lowbush cultivars are predominantly self-incompatible. Pollination in them occurs exclusively via insects. Bumblebees (Bombus) and wild bees play a decisive role. Pollination by honey bees (Apis mellifera) seems little effective, as they tend to open the flowers from the side and do not pick up pollen. Promoting certain native plants on the cultivation areas plays an important role in the settlement and establishment of flower-visiting insects.

Fruit growth and ripening extend, depending on cultivar and weather, over eight to 16 weeks. The fruits go through three development phases. After fertilization, the young fruits rapidly increase in size through cell divisions in the fruit tissue for about four weeks. This phase is replaced by an apparent rest phase in which the fruits do not grow further, but the seeds or embryos inside store reserve substances. Then the fruit increases noticeably in size again, although the number of cells no longer increases, but they strongly take up water and elongate. At the end of this phase, the fruit skin color changes from green through pale green and purple to the cultivar-typical blue, the fruit ripens and becomes soft. At the same time, the contents change: sugars are built up (or stored) and acids broken down. The characteristic aroma compounds and the typical bloom on the surface form only at the end of fruit ripening. The latter fulfills several functions for the fruit: It protects the berry from excessive heating by reflecting sunlight; it prevents the penetration of microbial pathogens, and finally rainwater beads off completely, so the berries dry quickly and harmful fungi have no good development conditions. The fruits of a bush do not all ripen simultaneously, even within a fruit cluster. The ripening stages are divided according to an American scheme into six phases, derived from the external color impression:

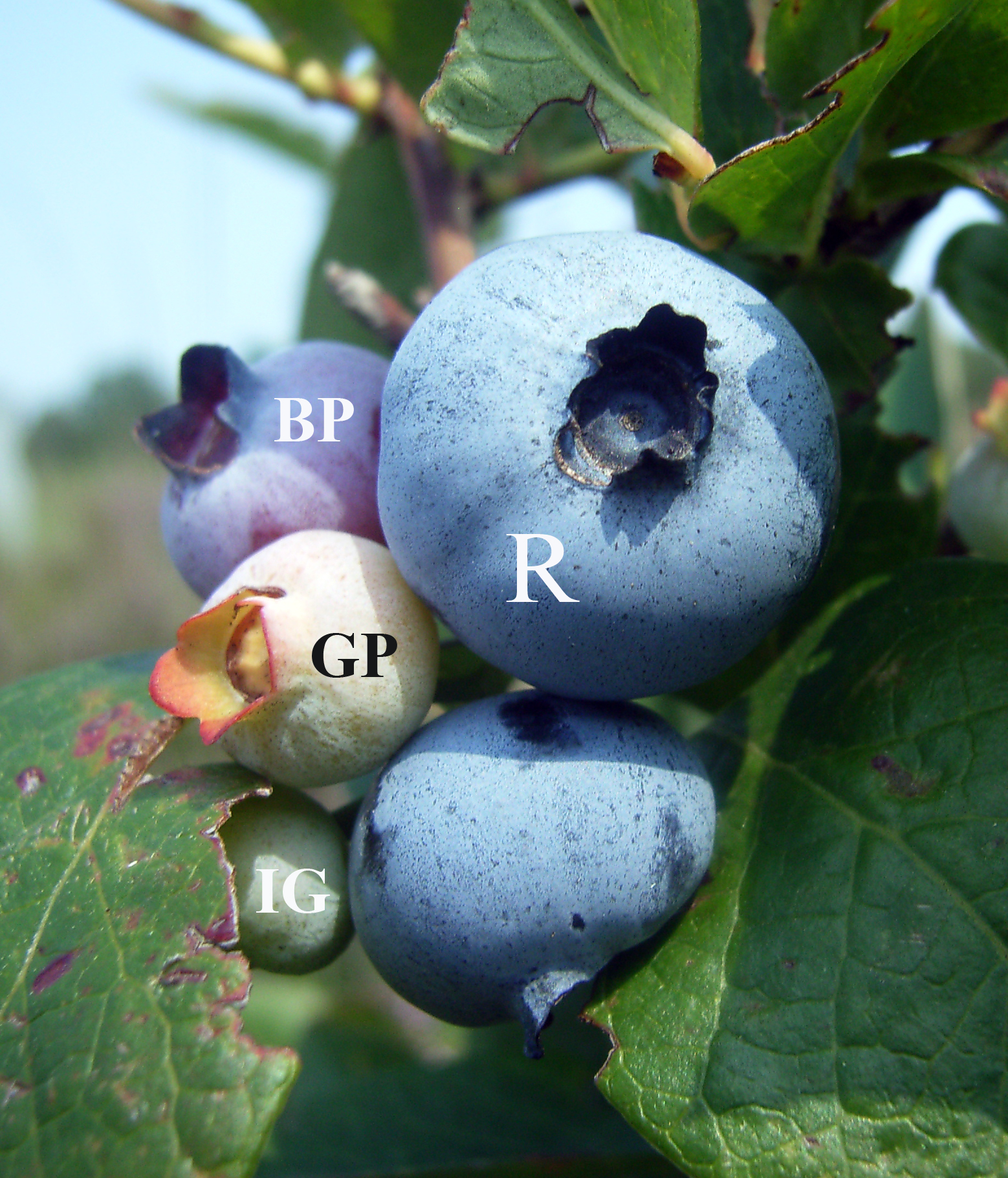
Ripening stages in a fruit cluster: R=Ripe, IG=Immature Green, GP=Green Pink, BP=Blue Pink

Ripening stage (English)	German	Fruit condition
IG = Immature Green	Unreif Grün	Completely green and hard
MG = Mature Green	Reif Grün	Light green to whitish, softer
GP = Green Pink	Grün Rosa	Pink coloration of the calyx region
BP = Blue Pink	Blau Rosa	Beginning blue coloration, stem region pink
B = Blue	Blau	Blue, except for pink ring in the stem region
R = Ripe	Reif	Completely blue and bloomy, soft

The seeds, already germination-capable at fruit ripening, germinate at 50 to 80%. About six to ten weeks pass until the unfolding of the first foliage leaf. Already after the appearance of the tenth to fifteenth leaf, the first lateral shoots form, which quickly overgrow the main shoot and ensure early branching.

=== Dormancy phase ===
The winter dormancy phase (dormancy) is initiated by decreasing day length and falling temperatures. In autumn, reserve substances (carbohydrates, starch, minerals) and the plant hormone abscisic acid are stored in the buds. The latter is intended to protect the plants from too early sprouting in the unfavorable season, which could lead to frost damage. During the winter months, this inhibitor is broken down, particularly effectively at temperatures between 0 and 7 °C. In spring, indole-3-acetic acid, a growth-promoting hormone, is formed increasingly. The chilling requirements of cultivated blueberry cultivars are expressed in hours and range between 250 and 1200 hours. For low-growing cultivars, the chilling need is over 1000 hours, for northern highbush cultivars 800 to 1100 hours, for rabbiteye blueberries between 350 and 800 hours. The shortest chilling requirement is for southern highbush blueberries widespread in warmer regions with 250 to 500 hours. Corresponding to the chilling requirement, the plants have a "heat requirement", a certain heat sum, which finally leads the woody plants to sprouting in spring.

The natural internal growth rhythm of the woody plants would be disturbed at climatically unfavorable sites. Thus, in the southern regions of the USA, only cultivars with the lowest possible chilling requirement are grown. Without sufficient dormancy, for example, sprouting of lowbush cultivars would be delayed and irregular. On the other hand, selections with low chilling requirements are not suitable for higher latitudes, as they would sprout too quickly and too early and thus be highly frost-prone.

== Origin and taxonomy ==
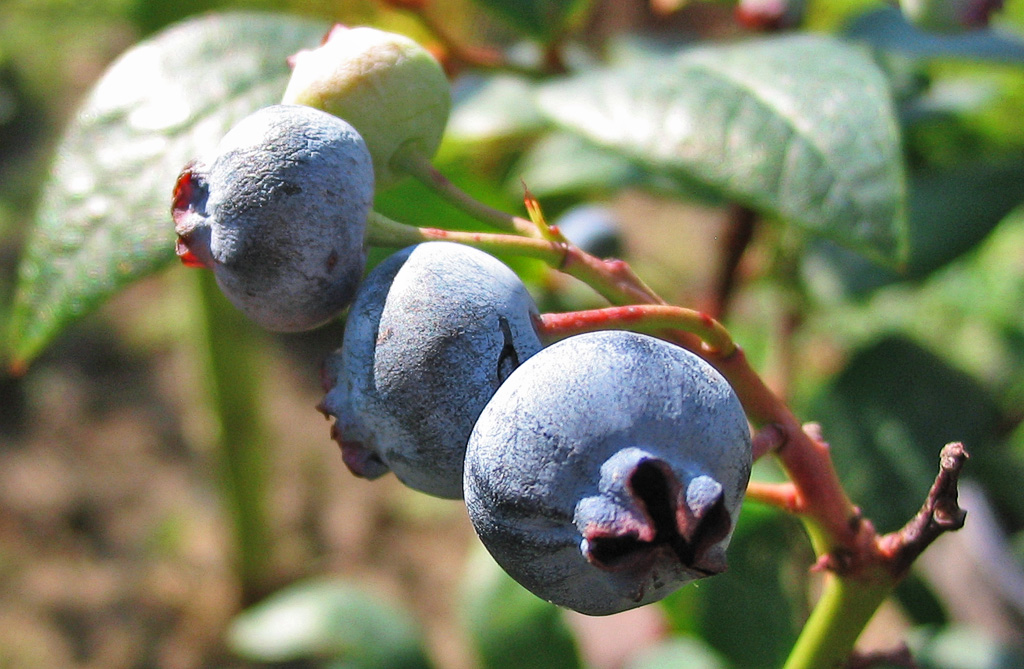
Vaccinium corymbosum, at the tip of the fruit the fleshy thickened remnants of the sepals

Cultivated blueberries have emerged through breeding from plant species native to the USA and Canada of the genus Vaccinium in the section or subgenus Cyanococcus or their hybrids. The exact number of species within the genus Vaccinium comprises, according to different literature sources and taxonomic treatments, about 100 to over 400 species.

Since the beginning of the 20th century, over 100 new cultivated blueberry cultivars have been developed, with new ones added annually. The older ones are selections from naturally occurring wild populations in North America (wild cultivars). The majority of current cultivars, however, are targeted crossbreeding products. In addition to selections from the cross of V. angustifolium and V. corymbosum, cultivated forms of the parent species themselves, further hybrids from the highbush blueberry (V. corymbosum) and other species of the genus Vaccinium are in cultivation. Thus, the species Vaccinium pallidum, V. angustifolium (syn. V. lamarkii), V. darrowi, V. elliottii, V. virgatum (syn. V. ashei), V. caesariense, V. fuscatum (syn. V. atrococcum), V. simultatum, and V. myrtilloides have contributed to the so-called northern hybrid complex.

The Vaccinium species cultivated as blueberries are compiled in the following table. Of particular interest for cultivation are polyploidy breedings, as they can grow several meters tall and thus significantly increase yield per area and plant. The subdivision of cultivated blueberries follows essentially according to the growth height of the bushes and their preferred cultivation regions. The species names follow the Germplasm Resources Information Network (GRIN). They partly deviate from those given in the main literature. Synonyms are in parentheses.

Group	English name	Systematic designation / involved wild forms	Ploidy	Origin / cultivation	Short description
Highbush blueberries	Northern Highbush Blueberries	Vaccinium corymbosum L.	Tetraploid	Northeastern states of the USA, southern Canada	Bush height up to 5 m; vigorous, upright individual bushes; leaves up to 8 cm long, entire-margined; fruits blue, bloomy, 0.7 to 1 cm large, flesh colorless; chilling requirement 800 to 1100 hours, frost hardiness −25 to −35 °C
Rabbiteye blueberries	Rabbiteye Blueberries	Vaccinium virgatum Ait. (syn. V. ashei Reade)	Hexaploid	Southeastern states of the USA	Bush height up to 4 m, vigorous, upright individual bushes; small, entire-margined leaves; heat- and drought-resistant; short winter rest; fruits black with large seeds; the calyx region of the fruit resembles a rabbit's eye, hence the name; chilling requirement 350 to 800 hours, frost hardiness −20 to −25 °C
Southern highbush blueberries	Southern Highbush Blueberries	V. corymbosum L. hybrid with V. darrowi Camp. or V. virgatum Ait. (syn. V. ashei Reade) and V. formosum Andrews (syn. V. australe Small) and other Vaccinium species	Tetraploid	Southeastern states of the USA along the Atlantic coast	Bush height 2 to 4 m; many root shoots; forming dense colonies; large leaves (2.5 to 8 cm); fruits blue, over 1 cm large; chilling requirement 250 to 500 hours, frost hardiness −15 to −20 °C
Half-high blueberries	Half-Highbush Blueberries	Vaccinium corymbosum × V. angustifolium (syn. V. lamarkii) = V. × atlanticum Bickn.	Diploid, Tetraploid	Northern states of the USA, Canada	Bush height 1 to 2 m; leaves 3 to 8 cm; fruits blue-black, bloomy, inside whitish; the specimens show great variability of parental traits; very cold-tolerant
Low-growing blueberries	Lowbush Blueberries	Vaccinium angustifolium Ait. (syn. V. lamarkii), V. myrtilloides Michx.	Diploid, Tetraploid	Northeastern states of the USA, Canada	Bush height 0.2 to 0.7 m; leaves 2 to 4 cm, small and toothed, in V. myrtilloides hairy; partly dense stands, runner-forming; fruits black-blue, blue, metallic blue bloomy, up to 0.7 cm; chilling requirement > 1000 hours, frost hardiness −25 to −40 °C

=== History of cultivation ===
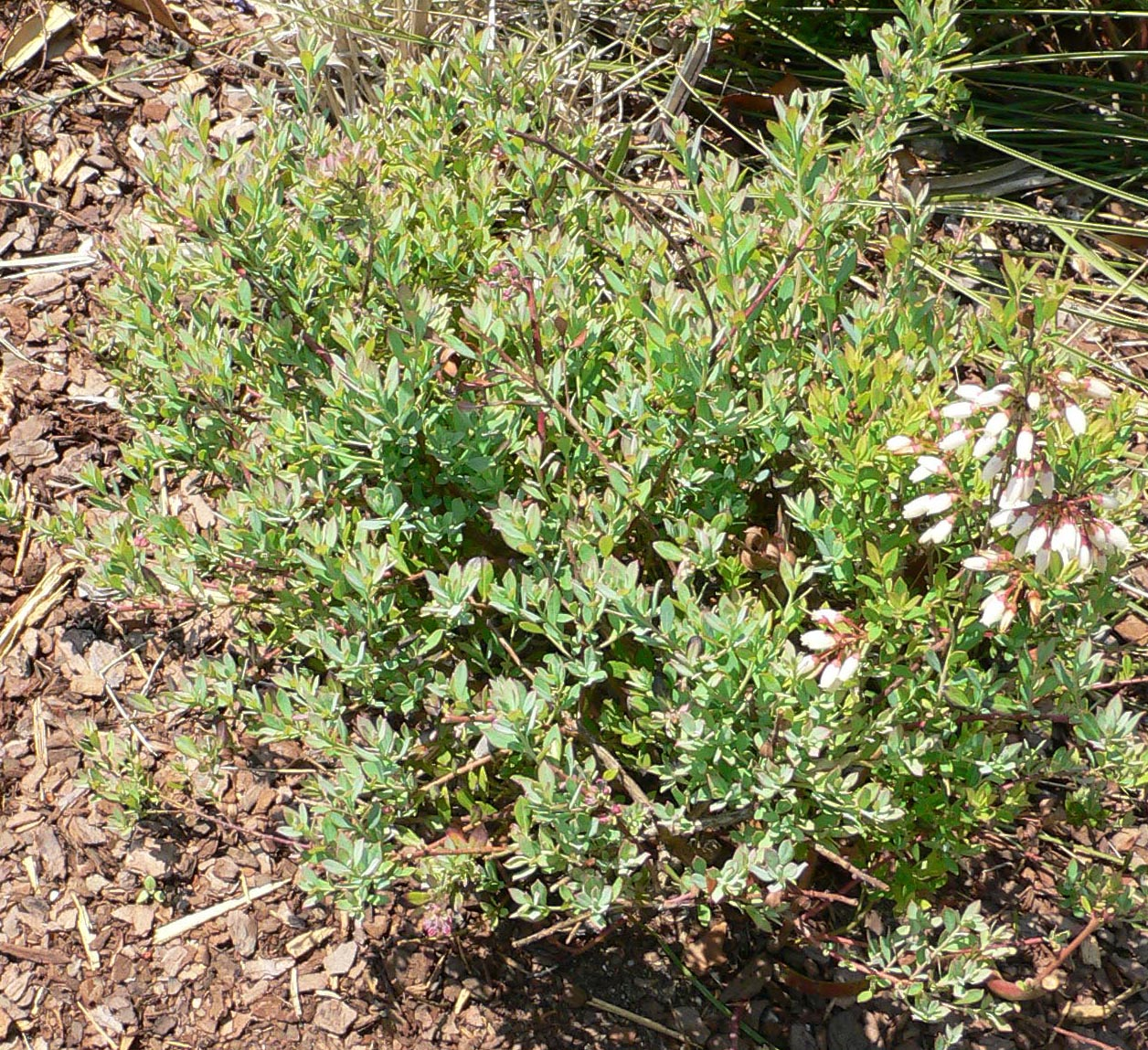
Vaccinium darrowii

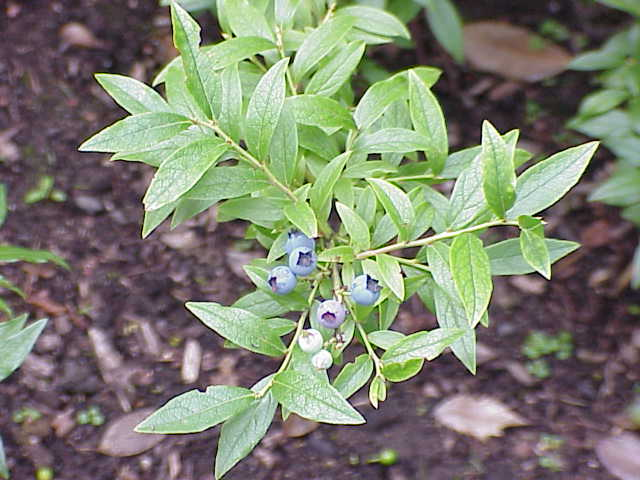
Vaccinium angustifolium

Already in the last decades of the 19th century, North American farmers grew the first wild forms of blueberries in their home gardens, mostly without great success, as the berries remained very variable in size, shape, and taste. They came to the view that "blueberries" could not be cultivated for the market. Only the plant breeder Elizabeth Coleman White (1871–1954) initiated a program around the turn of the century to select suitable blueberry bushes. In 1911, she contacted the botanist Frederick V. Coville (1867–1937), who had been conducting selection trials from wild populations since 1906, leading to a collaboration. While the White family had the financial means and a farm site in the Pine Barrens with the necessary infrastructure for an extensive selection program, Coville provided the scientific background knowledge. White's father, J. J. White, a successful farmer, engineer, and investor, already marketed cranberries in addition to blueberries from the surrounding moors and swamps, picked by seasonal workers. The pickers were commissioned as part of the selection program, for payment, to find the best bushes with the largest and sweetest fruits in the area; Elizabeth White named the bushes after their finders. The plants were divided and initially planted under glass on the Whites' farm. Already after five years, White and Coville had created a high-yielding and large-fruited cultivar in 1916, ready for marketing. The "first cultivated blueberry" was named 'Rubel' after Rube Leek, the finder of the bush. It was a bush of Vaccinium formosum, from which the wild cultivar was selected. It is still grown today and is part of numerous breedings and many subsequent selections.:

The blueberry cultivation area grew rapidly, especially in the eastern states of the USA. In the 1950s, the total cultivation area in the USA was around 8000 ha; in the 1990s, cultivated blueberries were already grown in 36 US states on an area of 20,000 ha.

Shares of blueberry types in North American cultivation including Canada in 2000:

Group	Area (ha)	Share (%)
Northern Highbush and Half-Highbush	20,830	24.6
Rabbiteye	5,220	6.3
Southern Highbush	1,840	2.3
Wild populations	56,600	66.8
Total	84,490	100

In Europe, the first plantings of cultivated blueberries for berry production were made in 1923 in the Netherlands. In Germany, blueberry breeding began in 1930 under the leadership of botanist Wilhelm Heermann. The first large cultivated blueberry fields were established in 1950. The main growing areas in Germany are in the Lüneburg Heath, Brandenburg, the Oldenburg region, as well as southern Germany and central Baden. Essentially, high to half-high forms are used. Lower forms are gaining importance due to their more aromatic fruits. Significant cultivation also occurs in Chile, Argentina, New Zealand, and Australia, in addition to the USA and Canada. In Europe, cultivated blueberries are grown in Germany, Poland, the Netherlands, France, and Spain. While the cultivation area here was still around 2300 ha in 2003, it nearly doubled to around 4500 ha by 2006.

=== Status of international breeding ===
The focus of breeding work on cultivated blueberries is in the USA. German breedings largely came to a halt after the efforts of pioneers in the 1950s and 1960s until today. Since about the late 1980s, cultivated blueberries have been increasingly worked on in New Zealand and Australia. Today, genetic engineering methods are used to shorten the lengthy breeding process and more targetedly introduce desired traits. Criteria for fruit quality include fruit size, fruit color, anthocyanin content, firmness, shatter resistance, high shelf life, and aroma. Furthermore, selections focus on expanding the ecological cultivation range, tolerance to higher soil pH values, high drought tolerance, resistance to diseases and pests, as well as late flowering and earlier harvest.

Improvement of cultivated blueberries is worked on particularly intensively at North Carolina State University (USA), Michigan State University (USA), the Nova Scotia Wild Blueberry Institute (Canada), the Horticultural and Food Research Institute of New Zealand, and the Australian Institute of Horticulture.

=== Cultivated blueberry cultivars ===
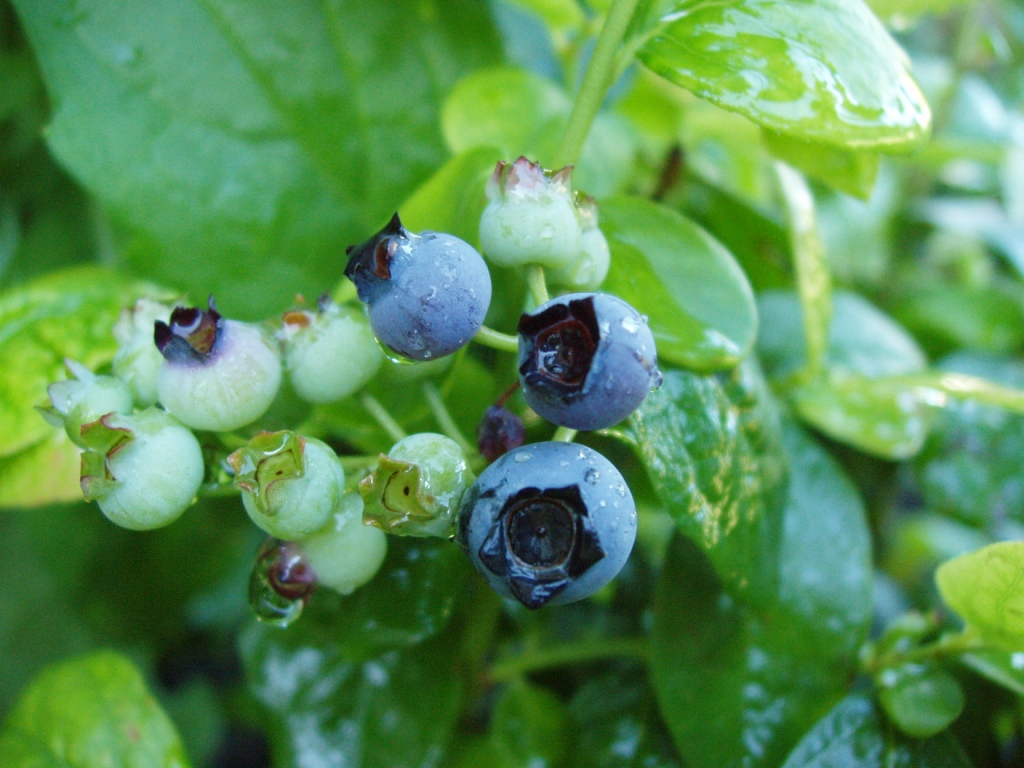
The cultivar 'Polaris'

The German breeder Wilhelm Heermann selected from the hybrid Vaccinium corumbosum × V. angustifolium the 'Blau-Weiß-Goldtraube' and 'Blau-Weiß-Zuckertraube', from which the cultivars 'Blau-Weiß-Goldtraube 71' and 'Rekord' were later selected. Furthermore, 'Herma I' and 'Herma II', 'Gila', and 'Greta' originate from Germany. The mentioned cultivars are still grown today. Most cultivars come from the USA, in addition there are crosses like 'Bluerose' as well as 'Maru' and 'Rahi' from Australia or New Zealand.

About 20 to 30 cultivated blueberry cultivars are grown on a larger scale worldwide. The world market leader is the cultivar 'Bluecrop', known for being cold-hardy, drought-tolerant, and resistant to diseases and pests.

A selection of cultivars (group Northern Highbush and Rabbiteye), their origin, year of introduction, and parentage is given in the following table:

Cultivar	Country, year of introduction	Parentage
'Berkeley'	USA, 1949	'Stanley' × ('Jersey' × 'Pionieer')
'Blau-Weiß-Goldtraube 23'	Germany, 1960	Cultivar group from V. corymbosum × V. angustifolium
'Blau-Weiß-Zuckertraube'	Germany, n.a.	Cultivar group from V. corymbosum × V. angustifolium
'Blau-Weiß-Rekord'	Germany, 1958	Selection from Blau-Weiß-Zuckertraube
'Bluecrop'	USA, 1952	('Jersey' × 'Pionieer') × ('Stanley' × 'June')
'Bluerose'	Australia, n.a.	n.a.
'Bluetta'	USA, 1968	('North Sedgewick Lowbush' × 'Coville') × 'Earliblue'
'Coville'	USA, 1949	('Jersey' × 'Pionieer') × 'Stanley'
'Denise Blue'	Australia, 1978	Open pollination of 'Late Blue'
'Duke'	USA, 1987	('Ivanhoe' × 'Earliblue') × 192-8 (E-30 × E-11)
'Earliblue'	USA, 1952	'Stanley' × 'Weymouth'
'Elizabeth'	USA, 1966	('Kathrine' × 'Jersey') × 'Scrammel'
'Gila'	Germany, n.a.	n.a.
'Greta'	Germany, n.a.	n.a.
'Maru'	New Zealand, 1991	Open pollination of 'Premier' (Rabbiteye)
'Nui'	New Zealand, 1988	('Ashworth' × 'Earliblue') × 'Bluecrop'
'Patriot'	USA, 1976	('Dixi' × 'Michigan LB1') × 'Earliblue'
'Polaris'	USA, 1996	n.a.
'Rahi'	New Zealand, 1991	Open pollination of 'Premier' (Rabbiteye)
'Reka'	New Zealand, 1988	('Ashworth' × 'Earliblue') × 'Bluecrop'

== Cultivated blueberry cultivation ==
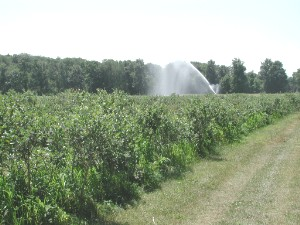
Blueberry plantation in Plainville, New York

The natural sites of Vaccinium species are acidic, nutrient-poor, humus-rich bog and sand soils. The various cultivars place different demands on the soils according to the requirements of their parent species, and not the same conditions apply to all. Furthermore, the genetic material of cultivated blueberries comes from species whose natural distribution area extends in North America over several climate zones. Accordingly, the climatic requirements of the different selections are also varied. Neither in North America nor in Europe can cultivated blueberries be grown in arbitrary regions. However, it is possible to create targeted cultivars for different climate zones, so that in Europe the cultivation of suitable breedings is feasible from Norway to Spain, in the latter case under foil cover and with considerable water expenditure.

=== Soils ===
Regarding the physico-chemical properties of the soils, a high proportion of air-conducting coarse pores is required for blueberry cultivation. Furthermore, moisture must be uniform throughout the year. The pH values should be low, i.e., in the acidic range (optimal between 4 and 4.5). The proportion of organic matter should be high (about 4 to 5% humus content). Studies have shown that vegetative growth of various breedings is strongest at pH values below 5 and decreases linearly with increasing pH. Furthermore, experience reports indicate that growth of blueberry plants on peat can apparently be significantly improved. Alternatively, sawdust and bark material are said to positively influence root development.

Blueberries depend on uniformly high soil moisture. They lack special adaptations to alternating wet conditions, so drought quickly leads to high water losses and leaf damage. The high density of stomata on the leaf undersides with 500 to 600/mm^{2} promotes evaporation losses. Finally, flower buds die off and no new flower formation occurs. In contrast, flooding is apparently tolerated to a certain extent. Flooding tolerance is attributed, among other things, to the formation of enlarged epidermal cells that are supposed to act like an aerenchyma (= air-filled tissue). The bark of the stems is also said to form enlarged cells during flooding. Under waterlogging, the leaves have larger air-filled intercellular spaces in the spongy mesophyll to facilitate oxygen supply. However, if the tolerance limit is exceeded, damage occurs. First symptoms are leaf yellowing and reddening, leaf drop, and dieback of shoot tips. Furthermore, under wet conditions, Phytophthora root rot occurs more frequently.

Due to the lack of root hairs, the water and nutrient uptake of the Ericaceae root system is limited. In adaptation to their natural, nutrient-poor and often wet sites, the representatives of the heath family therefore live in a mutually beneficial community (symbiosis) with soil-borne fungi, the mycorrhiza. The fungi supply the plant with mineral salts and water and in turn receive part of the assimilates produced by the photosynthesis of the plants. For example, a relevant fungus Pezizella ericae is almost always present in the soil of natural occurrences, but not in planting substrates and soils long used for agriculture. In cultivated blueberries in Europe, mycorrhiza was not detected in every tested plant. pH values above 5 seem to suppress successful colonization of blueberry roots. Furthermore, the degree of root colonization seems to decrease with increasing nitrogen applications. Despite numerous studies, no clear effect of soil fungi on growth and fruit quality of cultivated blueberries could ultimately be demonstrated.

Regarding fertilization of cultivated blueberries, experiences vary widely. Blueberries are considered extremely salt-sensitive, so excessive applications can have negative effects. To estimate the required fertilizer amounts, the nutrient contents of the leaves are generally used. Supplemented by soil analyses and nutrient removals by the fruits, the nutrient requirements of the plants can be inferred. Recommendations assume fertilizer applications of the main nutrients nitrogen, phosphorus, and potassium in the ratio 3:1:2. In addition, magnesium, copper, and zinc are important for the main nutrition of blueberry plants. The weighting of individual nutrients depends essentially on the specific conditions of the planting and the observational skills of the operators.

=== Climate ===
For blueberry cultivation, the distribution of precipitation over the year is more important than its amount. The shallow root system is particularly sensitive to drying out. The soil in the root zone must be uniformly moist. Therefore, for example, additional irrigation may be necessary during summer drought. Drought during flowering leads to weak or damaged fruit set, with only a few berries forming; parts of the fruit set remain empty. Cultivated blueberries need full sunlight for good growth and the formation of high fruit quality. In contrast to the wild blueberries native to Central Europe (Vaccinium myrtillus), they do not tolerate shading. Strong wind can damage young fruits in exposed locations by rubbing against each other and also lead to high water losses through evaporation. Through excessively high evaporation in winter, the bushes cool down, which can lead to frost damage. Wind protection through hedges or tree strips therefore belongs to improving the site factors in cultivated blueberry cultivation.

=== Plant protection ===
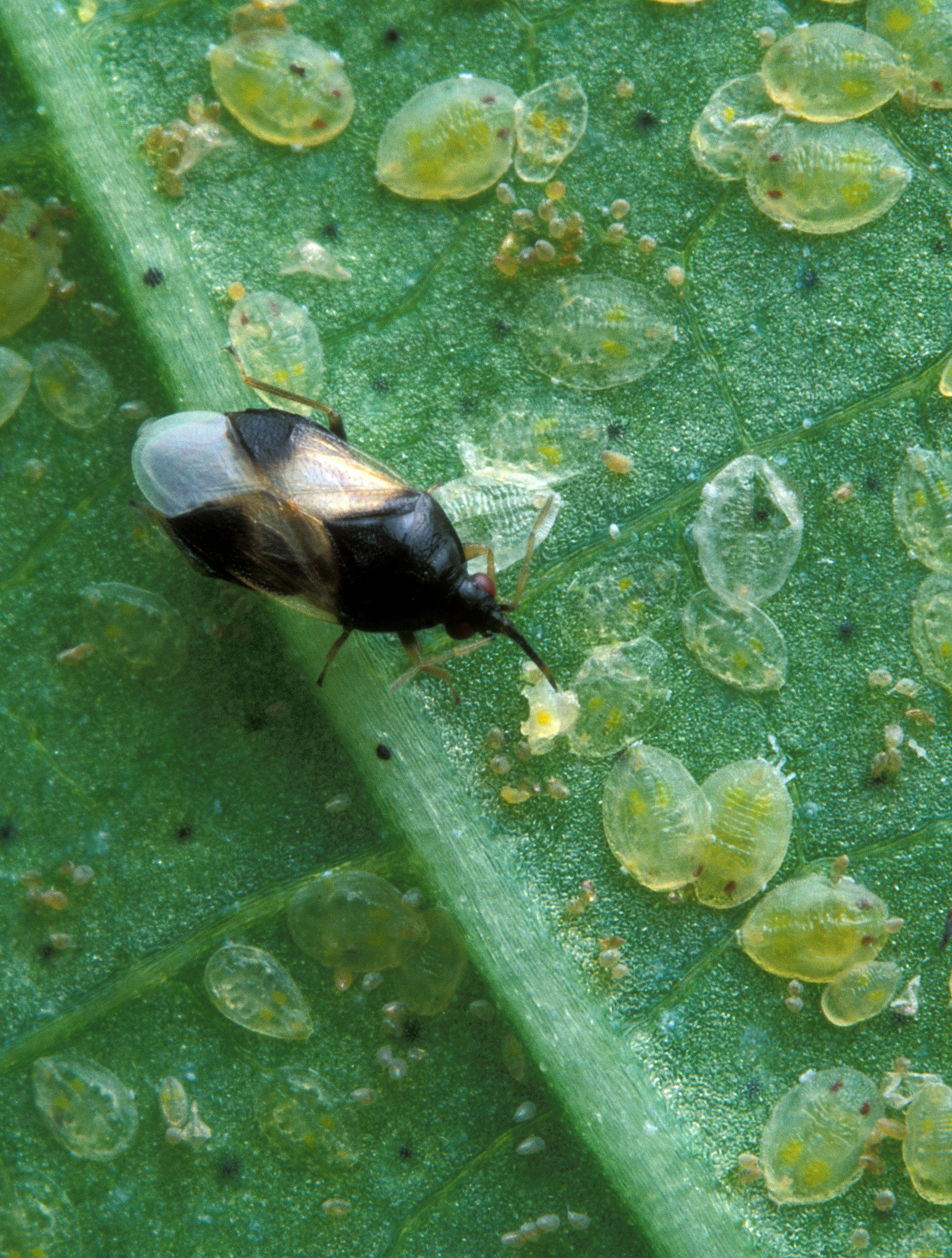
Minute pirate bug (Orius insidiosus) as a potential beneficial in blueberry cultures sucking on scale insects.

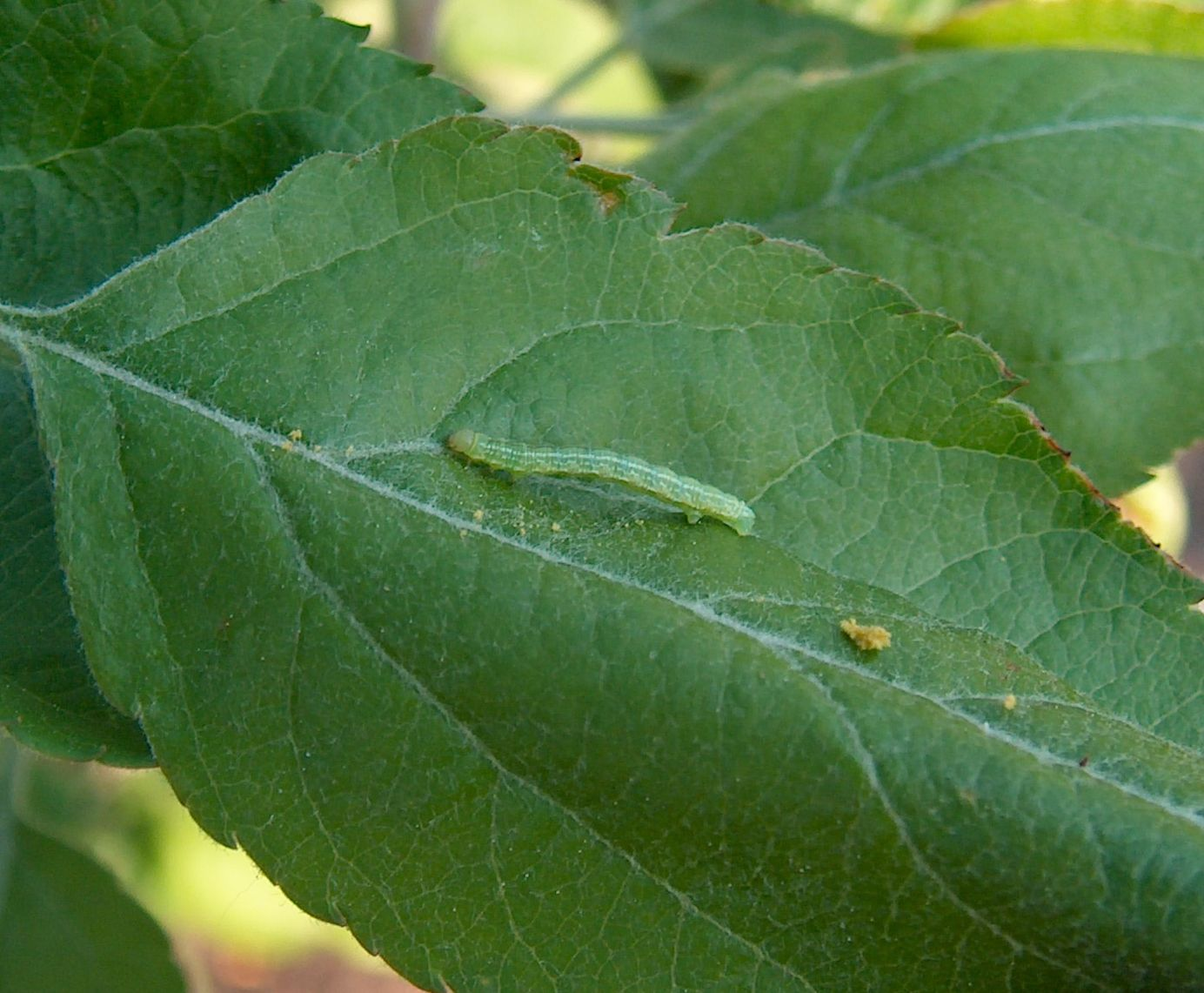
Caterpillar of the winter moth (Operophtera brumata) as a potential pest on blueberry bushes through feeding on buds, flowers, and leaves.

In Europe, cultivated blueberries have only been grown for a short time, so their natural enemies are hardly present. The cultivated blueberry is therefore still considered a so-called health fruit, where intensive plant protection measures are hardly necessary. In North America, however, a number of plant diseases and numerous pests are known. In Europe, initial signs of disease and pest pressure are observable through the introduction of pathogens from North America. In addition, cultivated blueberries are affected by native pests. Chemical agents such as insecticides and fungicides are used as measures against pathogens. Meanwhile, preventive control (biological control) is increasingly entering North American cultivated blueberry cultivation, which is already widespread in European agriculture in integrated cultivation. Here, the natural enemies of pest insects (beneficial insects) are targetedly promoted on the cultivation areas by settling their host plants (food, oviposition site) on the areas. These beneficials consist of predators and parasitoids. The predators, such as minute pirate bugs of the genus Orius (e.g. Orius insidiosus) or ladybirds (Coccinellidae), feed mainly on soft-skinned potential pest insects of all developmental stages on blueberries. Various arachnids also eat larger insects. Parasitoids, on the other hand, lay their eggs in adult pest insects or their larvae and thus cause their death. These include, among others, ichneumon wasps (Ichneumonidae) and braconid wasps (Braconidae).

In Europe, it is mainly insects and fungi that can cause harvest losses. These include the now introduced to North America winter moth (Operophtera brumata). Its caterpillars bore into the buds and hollow them out and also eat the flower organs. Other moths whose caterpillar feeding on leaves and fruits can cause damage to blueberry bushes are tortricids and noctuids. The larvae of the introduced from North America gall midge Prodiplosis vaccinii suck on the shoot tips. These curl up, discolor, and eventually die off. The consequence is new sprouting and associated undesirable premature branching. The San Jose scale (Quadraspidiotus perniciosus) belonging to the armored scales was introduced from East Asia via North America to Europe. It causes atrophy of the bushes. Due to strong honeydew production, sooty molds (Dematiaceae), for example of the genus Alternaria, occur on leaves and fruits. The Ericaphis fimbriata aphid also originates from the USA. It produces a lot of honeydew. This leads to contamination of the fruits.

In blueberry cultivars, resistances to diseases occur in part, which are increasingly considered in breeding. The following fungal-caused diseases (mycosises) can play a role under Central European conditions: Flower and fruit rot (gray mold; Botrytis cinerea) occurs in humid weather. The infection occurs in the flowers. These turn brown and later a gray fungal lawn appears. The inflorescences clump and entire shoots can die off. Twig and fruit monilia (Monilinia vaccinii-corymbosi) is also promoted by humid weather. Infected plant parts wilt and eventually die off, turning black-brown. The fungus was first detected in Europe (Austria) in 2002. Godronia shoot dieback (Godronia cassandrae) was introduced from North America and occurs increasingly frequently in European plantings. It causes dieback of branches and shoots. The fungus overwinters in cancer-like infection sites. The shoots first turn red-brown, then die off.

Further diseases on blueberries are caused by plant viruses and bacteria. For example, the virosis known in North America as "shoestring disease" is caused by the Blueberry shoestring virus (BSSV) from the genus Sobemovirus and transmitted from bush to bush by the sucking activity of the aphid Illinoia pepperii. The disease initially causes a shoestring-like deformation of the leaves. Subsequently, the plants are weakened and the blue coloration of the fruits is impaired. The bacterium Agrobacterium tumefaciens enters through injuries and causes crown galls. The plants show abnormal growth and eventually dwarf.

Mammals, such as voles, rabbits, and other wildlife, can cause feeding damage to the bushes. Wildlife fences serve against wild mammals. The berries are also food for numerous bird species. Especially through common starlings, significant harvest losses can occur, which can be limited by bird nets.

=== Propagation ===
Cultivated blueberries can be propagated both via seeds and by vegetative methods (plant propagation). Seedlings play a subordinate role in cultivation because the cultivar character is lost and seedlings only come to flower after years. Raising seedlings, however, is of great importance for breeding. Primarily, cultivated blueberries for commercial cultivation are propagated via cuttings. Both green cuttings and hardwood cuttings are obtained from selected mother plants and placed in a cultivation substrate. Rooting varies depending on the cultivar and can take eight to 15 weeks. Rooting can be accelerated by heating the cultivation substrate and using rooting hormone preparations. Cutting propagation takes place in greenhouses or foil tunnels at 25 to 30 °C. Water supply to the cuttings is ensured via high air humidity and additionally via mist systems.

=== Harvest ===
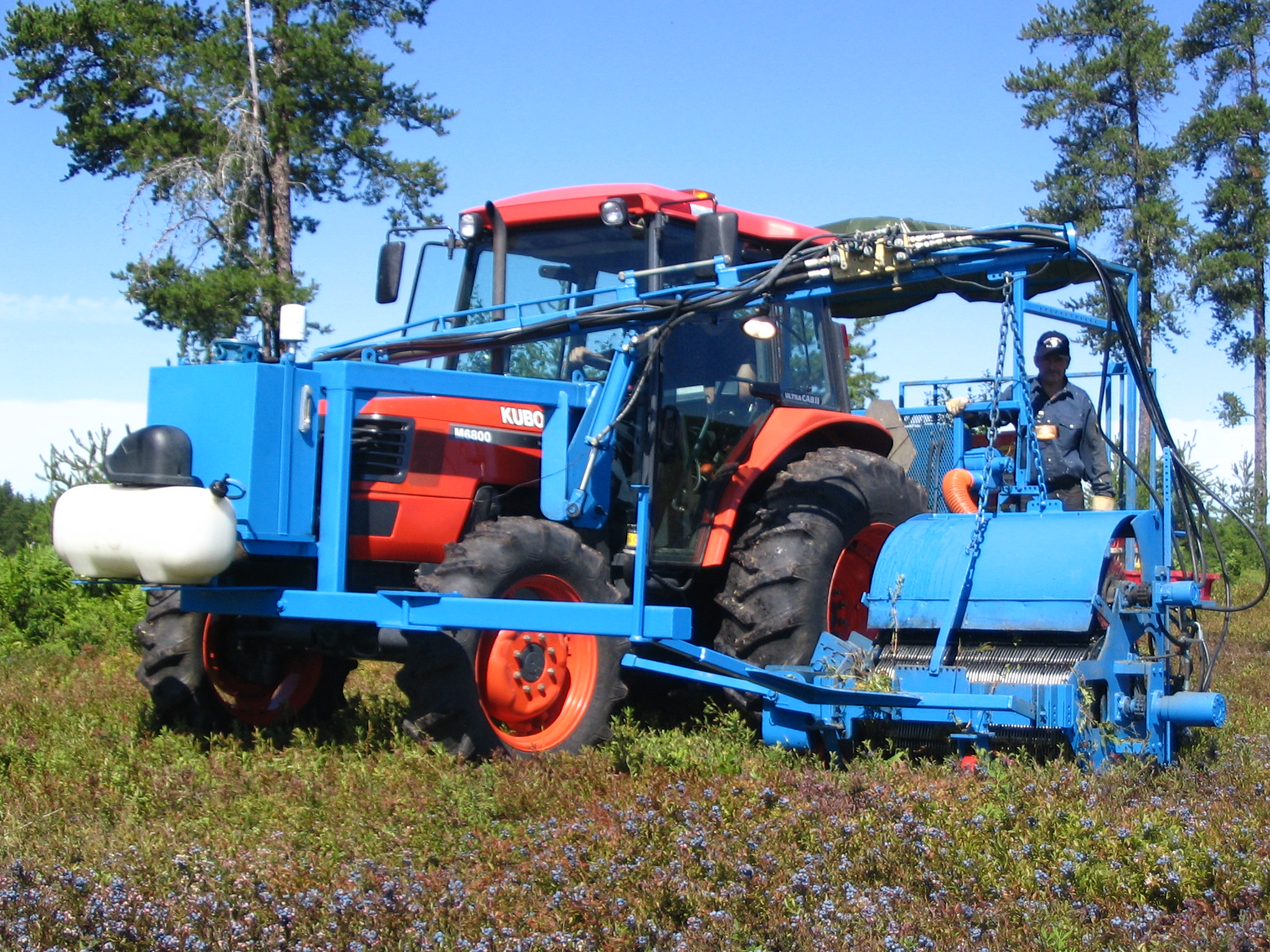
Mechanical blueberry harvest (wild form) in New Brunswick, Canada

The harvest of cultivated blueberries extends over a period of about twelve weeks. According to American studies, the bushes deliver yields of 1 to 1.5 kg fruits per bush in the first years. In full yield, they are supposed to produce about 3 to 5 kg. Individual bushes can deliver up to 20 kg berries. In Germany, depending on the year, yields of an average of 3 to 7 tons per hectare are achieved.

The best quality is provided by hand harvest. Ripe, uniform, and undamaged fruits for the fresh market can be picked directly into the sales container. For almost all cultivars, multiple passes through the plantings are necessary, as the berries ripen at different times. The berries are picked carefully without wiping off the white bloom. One picking worker manages about 4 to 8 kg blueberries per hour.

In the larger plantings in the USA and Canada, special harvest machines have been introduced, which work more cost-effectively. However, they deliver fruits primarily suitable for processing. They are pulled by a tractor or are self-propelled, moving over the bushes ("over-the row machines"). The berries are separated from the bushes by shaking, beating, or stripping. This results in mechanical damage and harvest of unripe fruits. Technical progress, however, enables increasingly gentle harvest, so the share for the fresh market increases.

== Marketing and production ==
The main domestic growing area is Lower Saxony with two-thirds of the harvest quantity, while a large part of the imports come from Spain. About half of the German cultivated blueberry harvest is sold via direct marketing from the farm, via farmers' markets, or in pick-your-own plantings. The rest is taken by wholesale markets or processors via contract farming or producer associations. In North America, 10% of the harvest is sold via pick-your-own. 90% are marketed equally as fresh produce or supplied for processing.

Marketing strategies include especially large blueberry festivals in the USA. They are usually organized by producer associations in the growing states. In addition to sales promotion, these festivals often serve tourist purposes. Blueberry festivals are also held in Germany to increase the awareness of the fruits and to promote sales. They are organized by the farms themselves, producer associations, or marketing companies. Here too, the tourist component is used; annually in Walsrode in the Heidekreis district, a blueberry queen is elected who assumes representative tasks regionally. She is to advertise the specialties of her homeland and the quality of local products.

How high the global production of Vaccinium fruits is overall is difficult to determine. Many different species are included in the statistics under the name "blueberry". Often no distinction is made between cultivated blueberries and cranberries. Moreover, the figures include harvests from wild populations. The FAO determined a world production of 841,886 t for 2020. The leaders in blueberry production are the USA with 34.9% of the world harvest; followed by Peru (21.4%), Canada with 17.4%, and Poland with 6.6% (including wild populations of V. angustifolium and V. macrocarpon and further species). More than half of US production falls to the states of Michigan and Maine. While in Maine almost exclusively wild populations are harvested, in Michigan predominantly cultivated blueberries are grown and harvested. Larger cultivated blueberry plantations are also found in the states of New Jersey, Oregon, Georgia, North Carolina, Washington, California, Florida, and Mississippi.

Areas and yields in US cultivated blueberry cultivation in 2006:

State	Yield (t)	Area (ha)
Michigan	40,822	7,325
New Jersey	23,586	3,075
Oregon	16,147	1,780
Georgia	14,288	2,832
North Carolina	11,566	1,902
Washington	8,618	1,376
California	4,536	930
Florida	3,175	1,052
Mississippi	2,086	930
Indiana	1,542	250
New York	907	283
Arkansas	726	214
Alabama	145	109
Total	128,145	22,058

Significant cultivation with clear area and harvest increases occurs, among others, in Chile and Argentina. Cultivation of cultivated blueberries on the southern hemisphere enables year-round supply with fresh produce, so-called "off-season fruits".

In Europe, cultivated blueberry cultivation is concentrated in Poland and Germany. Clear area increases are expected in Poland and Spain in the coming years.

	2004		2005		2006	
Country	ha	t	ha	t	ha	t
Germany	1,500	8,000	1,600	7,000	1,800	8,000
Poland	1,500	3,750	1,700	3,750	1,800	5,000 to 8,000
France	300	1,500	300	1,700	300	1,700
Netherlands	300	1,500	330	1,650	370	1,650
Spain	150	900	200	1,000	300	1,600
Italy	160	800	180	800	180	1,200
Belgium	45	162	48	170	48	250
Portugal	40	200	40	200	40	250
Total	3,995	16,812	4,398	16,270	4,838	18,650

In 2020, blueberries were grown on 108 hectares in Switzerland and, according to a preliminary estimate, 550 tons (plus 50 t organic) were harvested. The self-sufficiency rate of Switzerland was 9 percent.

== Ingredients and health value ==
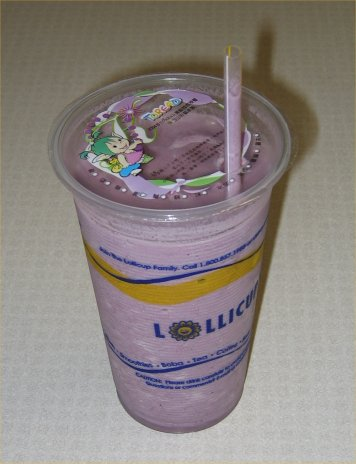
Smoothie from blueberries, a "trend drink" originating in the USA

In sugars, glucose (48%) and fructose (49%) predominate in cultivated blueberries. Sucrose occurs with only 3%. The fruit acid proportion is present as citric acid, malic acid, and quinic acid in a ratio of about 8:1:1. In wild blueberries, the ratio is about 3:1:3.

Ingredients of cultivated blueberry fruits (per 100 g fresh mass)

Ingredient	Content	Ingredient	Content
Calorific value	250 kJ (60 kcal)	Iron	0.17 mg
Water	83 g	Manganese	0.28 mg
Protein	0.6 g	Zinc	0.11 mg
Fat	0.5 g	Copper	0.06 mg
Carbohydrates	14 g	Selenium	0.6 μg
Citric acid	0.9 g	Polyphenols	0.25 mg
Cellulose	1 g	Vitamin A	100 IU
Potassium	90 mg	Vitamin B1 (Thiamin)	0.04 mg
Calcium	13 mg	Vitamin B2 complex	6.84 mg
Phosphorus	10 mg	Vitamin B6	0.036 mg
Magnesium	7 mg	Vitamin C	13 mg
Sodium	2 mg	Vitamin E	1.00 mg

The health value of fruits is seen, among other things, in being able to neutralize harmful oxygen radicals occurring in stress or illness in the human body (oxidative stress). In this context, phenols (0.5 to 2.5 mg/g fresh weight) and anthocyanins (1 to 3 mg/g fresh weight) are interesting. Anthocyanins are water-soluble, blue to red plant pigments located exclusively in the fruit skin in cultivated blueberries. The higher the phenol content and the more pigments in the fruit, the higher the antioxidant potential. The Oxygen Radical Absorbance Capacity (ORAC) is given in Trolox equivalents (μmol TE). The content of cultivated blueberries is estimated at about 25 μmol TE/g fresh weight. According to American studies, blueberries belong to the fruits with the highest stress-reducing effect. Thus, consuming blueberries is said to reduce cancer risk. The absorbing effect of blueberries is also said to stabilize the human immune system and prevent cardiovascular diseases and stroke.

== Use and storage ==
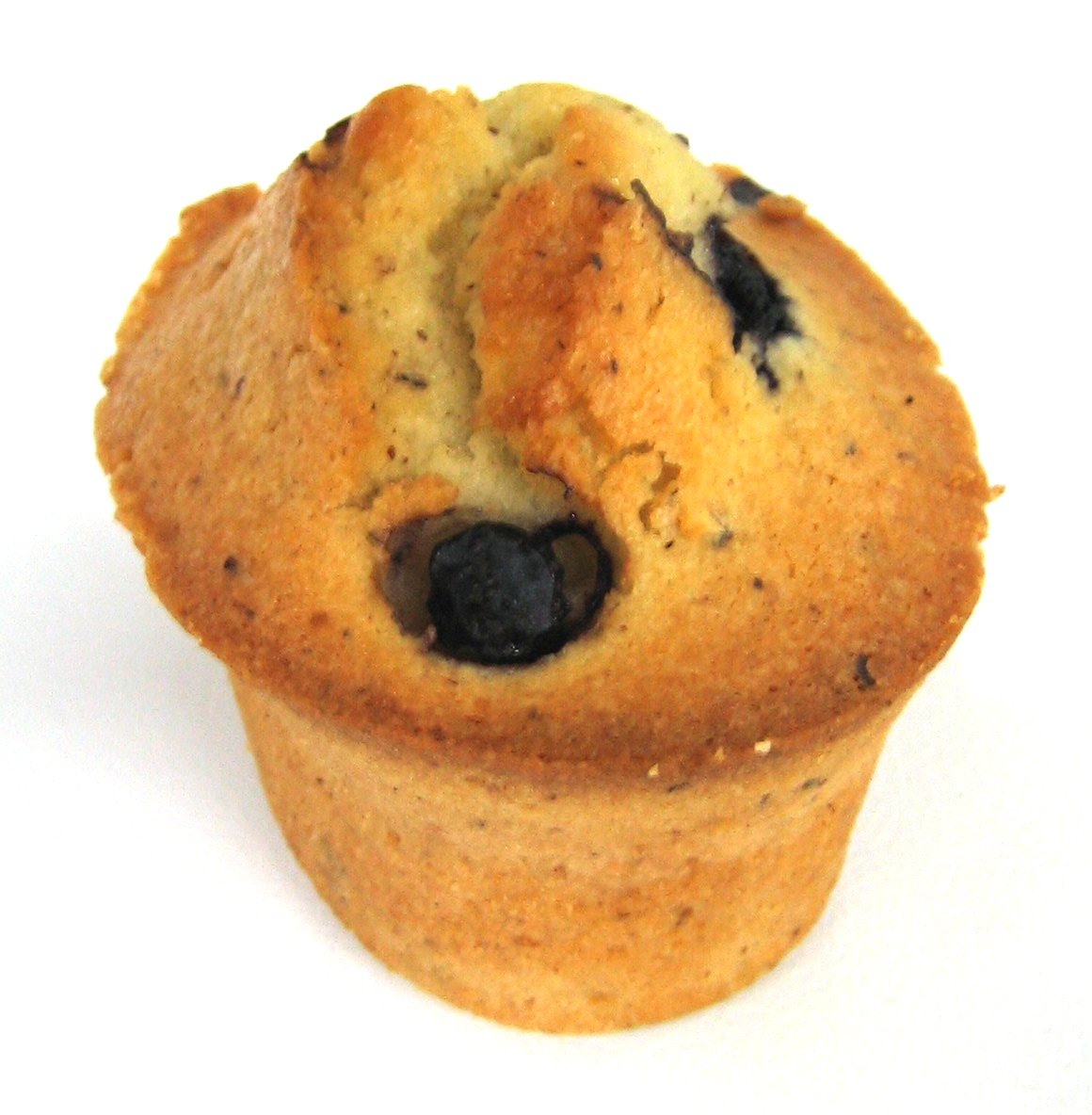
Blueberry muffin

Cultivated blueberry bushes play a subordinate role as pure ornamental woody plants due to their special site requirements. As berry suppliers, however, they are of great importance as food. The increasing cultivation areas worldwide and rising demand are signs of their growing popularity. Per capita consumption of fresh produce by Germans is about 100 g per year, per capita consumption in the USA is significantly higher at 370 to 570 g per year. Cultivated blueberries are used fresh in fruit salads, baked goods like muffins, pancakes, blueberry pie or cakes, in dairy dishes like quark or yogurt, compote or cold bowls, dried in muesli or fruit bars. Cultivated blueberries are ideal for jellies or jams, as they gel particularly well due to their pectin content. Furthermore, blueberries are a good base for juices and fruit nectars, alone or mixed with other fruits.

Fresh blueberries can be deep-frozen without problems, with the goods suffering hardly any quality losses. Deep-frozen fruits are very durable and can almost always be used in the kitchen instead of fresh produce. Storage of fresh berries, on the other hand, is limited. Blueberries do not form a distinct abscission layer, so depending on the cultivar, a more or less large wound occurs when detaching the fruit. This exposes vascular connections and parts of the epidermis. Through these scars, microorganisms can penetrate, eventually leading to rots. In Rhizopus soft rot (Rhizopus nigricans), the affected fruits quickly become soft and lose juice. The effective method to prevent fungal penetration is cooling to temperatures below 10 °C as soon as possible after harvest, then the fungi can no longer grow. Blueberries show increased fruit respiration at fruit maturity; they are climacteric fruits. The higher the fruit respiration, the lower their storability. Here too, cooling is essential. By lowering the storage temperature from 20 to almost 0 °C, the fruits of most cultivars can be stored up to eight times longer. While cultivated blueberries of the cultivar 'Bluecrop' are storable for about one week without cooling, this extends to about seven weeks at a storage temperature of about 0 °C. By additionally lowering the atmospheric oxygen content to about 2 to 3% and increasing the CO_{2} concentration to 8 to 12%, the storage duration can be significantly increased again.

== Invasiveness of the bush blueberry ==
Cultivated blueberries easily escape from their cultivation areas into the surroundings. The fruits are eaten by birds and mammals; the seeds are excreted again at other locations via the feces (endochory). At suitable sites, new plants can establish in this way, which can form dense stands via vegetative reproduction.

In Germany, the breeding-overformed hybrid Vaccinium angustifolium × Vaccinium corymbosum (syn. V. × atlanticum), referred to as bush blueberry or cultivated blueberry, is considered a so-called invasive species. Bush blueberries show great variability of traits. Many specimens are close in appearance to one of the parent species, transitions in all traits between both species are also very common. In Austria, it is classified as potentially invasive. Escapes have also been known from the Netherlands since 1949. Thus, the bush blueberry has a variety of direct and indirect ecological effects on other species, communities, or biotopes outside cultivation areas, especially in near-natural raised bog remnants in northwestern Europe. The spread of the bush blueberry has only been observed recently, its distribution is therefore still incompletely known. In Lower Saxony, it occurs in 20 districts. In the southern Lüneburg Heath, extensive escapes are known that exceed the total cultivation area by 14 times. Over about 50 years, distances between cultivation areas and spontaneous occurrences of the bush blueberry of about 2 kilometers were achieved. It escapes into pine forests and wetlands in the surroundings of cultivation areas.

The escapes can form dense stands. In pine forests, dense shrub layers arise from these, which displace the ground vegetation through shading. So far, no endangered species are affected here. The impenetrable shrub layers can hinder forestry work. The striking autumn coloration of the blueberry bushes, on the other hand, increases the attractiveness of the otherwise rather monotonous forest areas.

Raised bogs are sensitive, endangered, and legally protected biotopes. Here, the marginal areas as well as peat-cut and drained areas are affected, especially areas with near-natural vegetation. In the de- and regeneration stages of raised bogs, the bush blueberry displaces the bog-typical vegetation through light competition. Almost all raised bog species are endangered to critically endangered in Germany, albeit generally through urbanization, not through escape by the blueberry. In the "Moor in der Schotterheide", no bog-typical species could be found under a canopy of 90 to 95% bush blueberry, under 70% coverage the bog-typical species were displaced to minimal remnants. Furthermore, the degeneration of partially drained bogs can be accelerated by the bush blueberry, as the increased evaporation of the plant cover accelerates bog drying.

The release of alien plants is fundamentally not permitted without approval under the Federal Nature Conservation Act. Escapes have so far only occurred in the surroundings of plantations. To protect valuable bog vegetation from the penetration of the bush blueberry, it seems sensible to maintain a minimum distance of three kilometers between new plantations and bogs. Bogs nevertheless threatened by escapes should be protected from other threat factors such as drainage and peat cutting, as these would promote the immigration of the bush blueberry. No experience with controlling the bush blueberry exists yet. Due to its high regenerative capacity, cutting the plants alone is not sufficient. It would rather lead to an increase in shoot density. Complete digging out of the plants can be successful, whereby the strong disturbances of the sensitive biotopes and the side effects on the bog vegetation are to be avoided.

== Bibliography ==
- Georg Ebert: Anbau von Heidelbeeren und Cranberries. Praktiker-Reihe, Ulmer-Verlag, Stuttgart 2005, ISBN 978-3-8001-4420-4.
- Mark Rieger: Blueberries – Vaccinium spp., University of Georgia, URL, last update August 2006, accessed March 2008.
- Mark Longstroth: A Year in the Life of a Blueberry Bush (Memento from August 11, 2011 in the Internet Archive), Michigan State University 2000.
