= Alvernaviridae =

Virus classification
- (unranked): Virus
- Realm: Riboviria
- Kingdom: Orthornavirae
- Phylum: Pisuviricota
- Class: Pisoniviricetes
- Order: Sobelivirales
- Family: Alvernaviridae

Family of viruses

Alvernaviridae is a family of non-enveloped positive-strand RNA viruses. Dinoflagellates serve as natural hosts. There is one genus in this family, Dinornavirus, which contains one species: Heterocapsa circularisquama RNA virus 01 (Dinornavirus heterocapsae). Diseases associated with this family include host population control, possibly through lysis of the host cell.

== Structure ==
Viruses in Alvernaviridae are non-enveloped, with icosahedral and spherical geometries, and T=3 symmetry. The diameter is around 34 nm.

== Genome ==
Genomes are linear and non-segmented, around 4.4kb in length.

== Life cycle ==
Viral replication is cytoplasmic. Entry into the host cell is achieved by penetration into the host cell. Replication follows the positive-strand RNA virus replication model in the cytoplasm. Positive-strand RNA virus transcription is the method of transcription. The virus is assembled in the cytoplasm. Dinoflagellates serve as the natural host.
