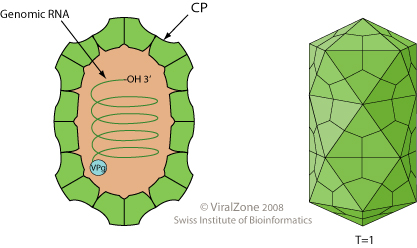
- Barnavirus virion
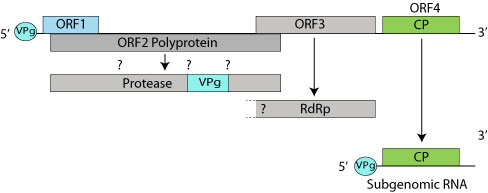
- Barnavirus genome

Virus classification
- (unranked): Virus
- Realm: Riboviria
- Kingdom: Orthornavirae
- Phylum: Pisuviricota
- Class: Pisoniviricetes
- Order: Sobelivirales
- Family: Barnaviridae

= Barnaviridae =

Family of viruses

Barnaviridae is a family of non-enveloped, positive-strand RNA viruses. Cultivated mushrooms serve as natural hosts. The family has one genus, Barnavirus, which contains one species: Mushroom bacilliform virus (Barnavirus agarici). Diseases associated with this family includes La France disease.

== Structure ==
Viruses in Barnaviridae are non-enveloped, with icosahedral and Bacilliform geometries, and T=1 symmetry. These viruses are about 50 nm long.

== Genome ==
Genomes are linear, around 4kb in length. The genome has 4 open reading frames. Genomic RNA serves as both the genome and viral messenger RNA. ORF2 is a polyprotein which is possibly auto-cleaved by the ORF2 viral protease. ORF3 encodes the RNA dependent RNA polymerase and may be translated by ribosomal frameshifting as an ORF2-ORF3 polyprotein. The single capsid protein (ORF4) is translated from a subgenomic RNA.

== Life cycle ==
Viral replication is cytoplasmic. Entry into the host cell is achieved by penetration into the host cell and passing it down. Replication follows the positive stranded RNA virus replication model. Positive stranded RNA virus transcription is the method of transcription. The virus is released horizontally via mycelium and basidiospores. Cultivated mushroom, Agaricus bisporus, serves as the natural host.
