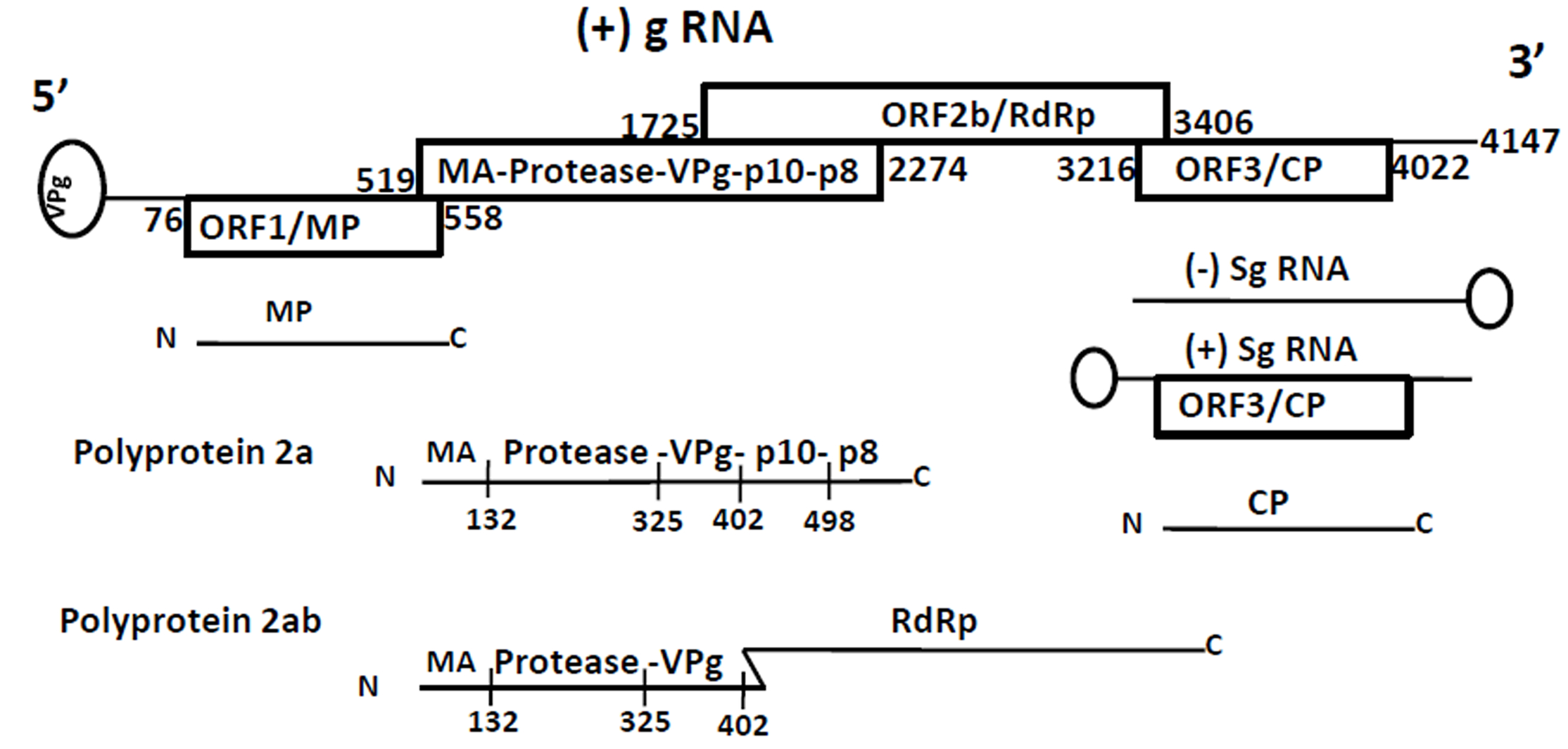
- Genome of Sesbania mosaic virus

Virus classification
- (unranked): Virus
- Realm: Riboviria
- Kingdom: Orthornavirae
- Phylum: Pisuviricota
- Class: Pisoniviricetes
- Order: Sobelivirales
- Family: Solemoviridae
- Genus: Sobemovirus

= Sobemovirus =

Genus of viruses

Sobemovirus is a genus of non-enveloped, positive-strand RNA viruses which infect plants. Plants serve as natural hosts. There are 27 species in this genus. Diseases associated with this genus include: mosaics and mottles.

== Structure ==
Viruses in Sobemovirus are non-enveloped, with icosahedral geometries, and T=3 symmetry. The diameter is around 30 nm.

Genus	Structure	Symmetry	Capsid	Genomic arrangement	Genomic segmentation
Sobemovirus	Icosahedral	T=3	Non-enveloped	Linear	Monopartite

== Genome ==
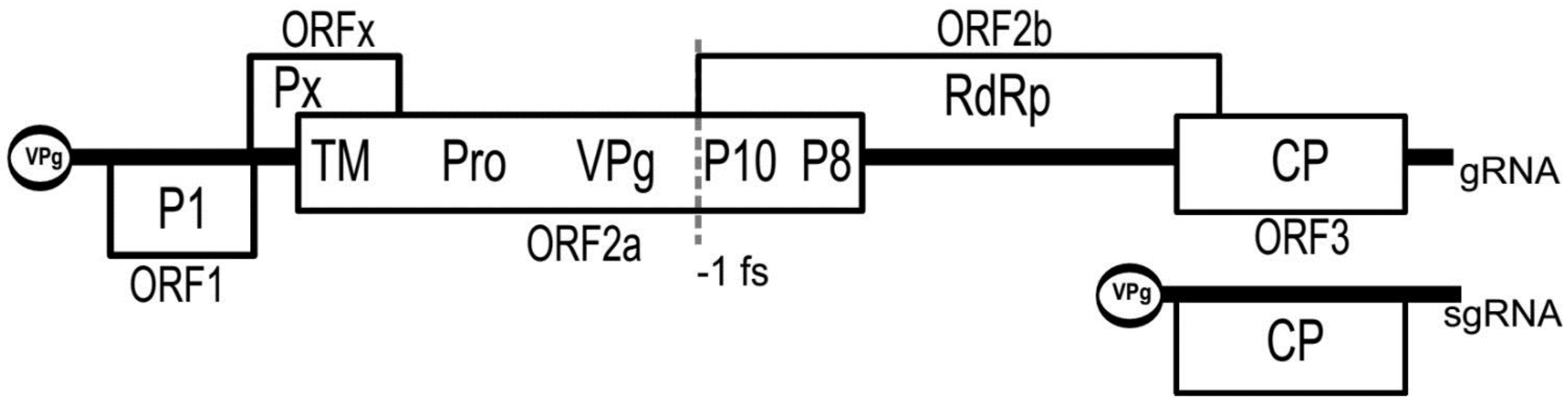
The genome of sobemoviruses exemplified by Sesbania mosaic virus

The genome is a single piece of linear, positive-sense, single-stranded RNA, 4,000–4,500 nucleotides in length. The genome encodes five open reading frames: ORF1, ORFs 2a and 2b, ORF3 and ORFx.

ORF1 encodes P1 which plays a role in suppression of silencing and virus movement.

ORFs 2a and 2b encode the replicational polyproteins P2a and P2ab. Translation of ORF2a from the genomic RNA is dependent on a leaky scanning mechanism.

ORF3 encodes the coat protein.

ORFx is conserved in all sobemoviruses. It overlaps the 5' end of ORF2a in the +2 reading frame and also extends some distance upstream of ORF2a. It lacks an AUG initiation codon and its expression is predicted to depend on low level initiation at near-cognate non-AUG codons, such as CUG, by a proportion of the ribosomes that are scanning the region between the ORF1 and ORF2a initiation codons. Its function is unknown but it appears to be essential for infection.

== Life cycle ==
Viral replication is cytoplasmic. Entry into the host cell is achieved by penetration into the host cell. Replication follows the positive stranded RNA virus replication model. Positive stranded RNA virus transcription is the method of transcription. Translation takes place by leaky scanning, and −1 ribosomal frameshifting. The virus exits the host cell by tubule-guided viral movement. Plants serve as the natural host. The virus is transmitted via a vector (CFMV: insects). Transmission routes are vector and seed borne.

Genus	Host details	Tissue tropism	Entry details	Release details	Replication site	Assembly site	Transmission
Sobemovirus	Plants	None	Penetration	Viral Movement	Cytoplasm	Cytoplasm	Vector, Seed borne

== Taxonomy ==
The genus includes the following species, listed by scientific name and followed by the exemplar virus of the species:

- Sobemovirus ARTVA, Artemisia virus A
- Sobemovirus BSSV, Blueberry shoestring virus
- Sobemovirus CFMV, Cocksfoot mottle virus
- Sobemovirus CNMOV, Cynosurus mottle virus
- Sobemovirus CYCMV, Cymbidium chlorotic mosaic virus
- Sobemovirus IYMV, Imperata yellow mottle virus
- Sobemovirus LTSV, Lucerne transient streak virus
- Sobemovirus MIMMV, Sobemovirus MIMMV
- Sobemovirus OLVS, Olive virus S
- Sobemovirus PHYRMV, Physalis rugose mosaic virus
- Sobemovirus PISSV, Pistacia sobemovirus
- Sobemovirus PLSV, Poaceae Liege sobemovirus
- Sobemovirus PLYV, Papaya lethal yellowing virus
- Sobemovirus RGMOV, Ryegrass mottle virus
- Sobemovirus ROMOV, Rottboellia yellow mottle virus
- Sobemovirus RYMV, Rice yellow mottle virus
- Sobemovirus SBMV, Southern bean mosaic virus
- Sobemovirus SCMOV, Subterranean clover mottle virus
- Sobemovirus SCPMV, Southern cowpea mosaic virus
- Sobemovirus SEMV, Sesbania mosaic virus
- Sobemovirus SMAMV, Snake melon asteroid mosaic virus
- Sobemovirus SNMOV, Solanum nodiflorum mottle virus
- Sobemovirus SOMV, Sowbane mosaic virus
- Sobemovirus SYCMV, Soybean yellow common mosaic virus
- Sobemovirus TROV, Turnip rosette virus
- Sobemovirus VTMOV, Velvet tobacco mottle virus
- Sobemovirus XYDV, Xufa yellow dwarf virus
