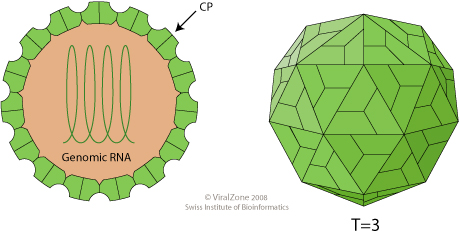
- Sobemovirus virion
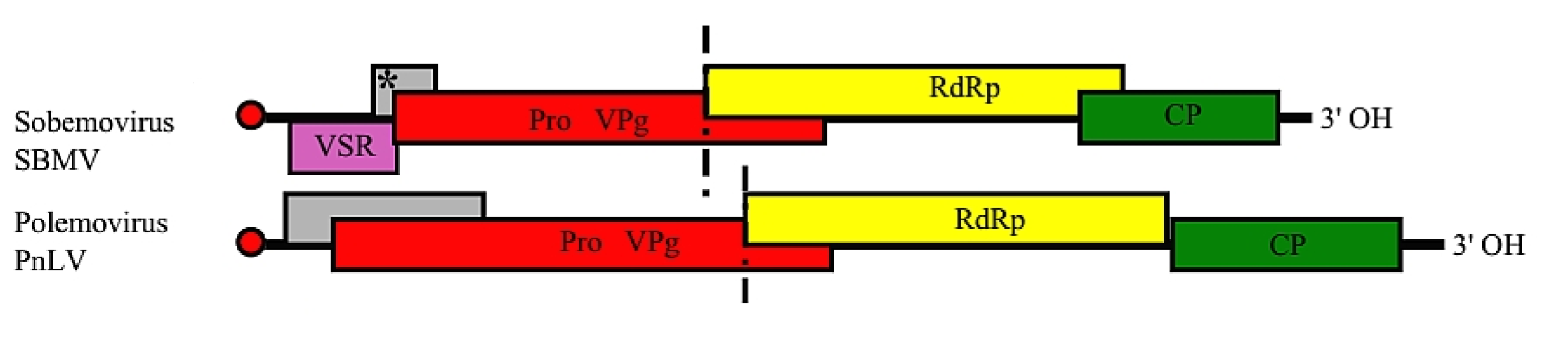
- Genome of Southern bean mosaic virus (SBMV) and Poinsettia latent virus (PnLV)

Virus classification
- (unranked): Virus
- Realm: Riboviria
- Kingdom: Orthornavirae
- Phylum: Pisuviricota
- Class: Pisoniviricetes
- Order: Sobelivirales
- Family: Solemoviridae

= Solemoviridae =

Family of viruses

Solemoviridae is a family of non-enveloped, positive-strand RNA viruses which infect plants. Solemoviridae is a member of the order Sobelivirales.

== Structure ==
Member viruses are non-enveloped and have a viral capsid with T=3 symmetry.

== Genome ==
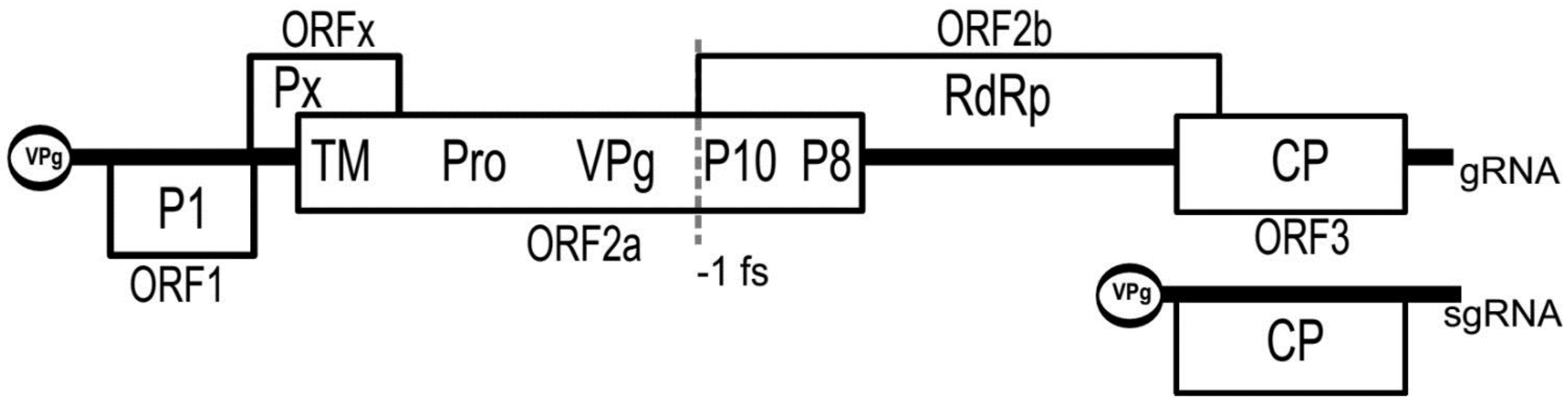
The genome of sobemoviruses exemplified by Sesbania mosaic virus.

Solemoviruses have a positive-sense, single-strand RNA genome. The length of the genome is 4652 bp. The 3' terminus does not have a polyA-tail. The 5' terminus has a genome-linked viral protein (VPg).

== Taxonomy ==
The family contains the following genera:

- Enamovirus
- Hubsclerovirus
- Polemovirus
- Polerovirus
- Sobemovirus

== See also ==
- Indonesian soybean dwarf virus
