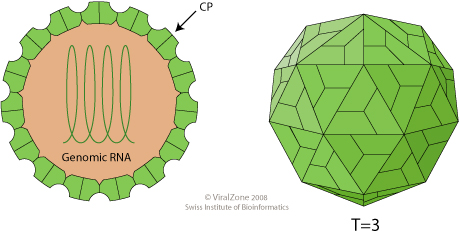
- Sobemovirus virion
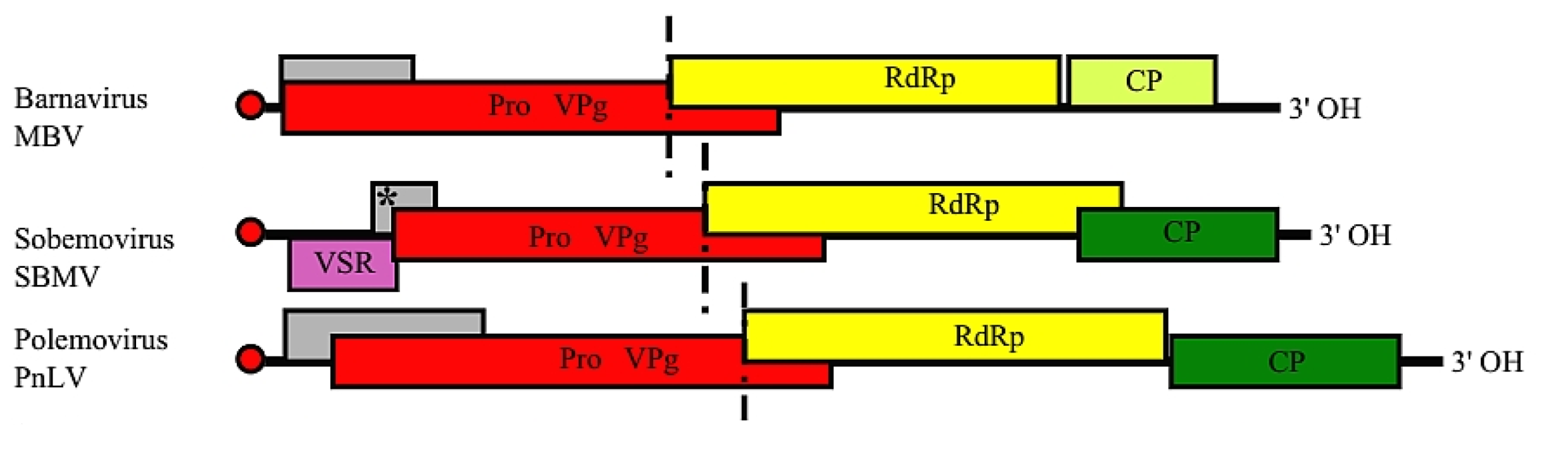
- Genomes of Mushroom bacilliform virus (Barnaviridae), Southern bean mosaic virus (Solemoviridae), and Poinsettia latent virus (Solemoviridae).

Virus classification
- (unranked): Virus
- Realm: Riboviria
- Kingdom: Orthornavirae
- Phylum: Pisuviricota
- Class: Pisoniviricetes
- Order: Sobelivirales

= Sobelivirales =

Order of viruses

Sobelivirales is an order of RNA viruses which infect eukaryotes. Member viruses have a positive-sense single-stranded RNA genome. The name of the group is a portmanteau of member orders "sobemovirus-like" and -virales which is the suffix for a virus order.

== Taxonomy ==
The following families are recognized:

- Alvernaviridae
- Barnaviridae
- Solemoviridae
