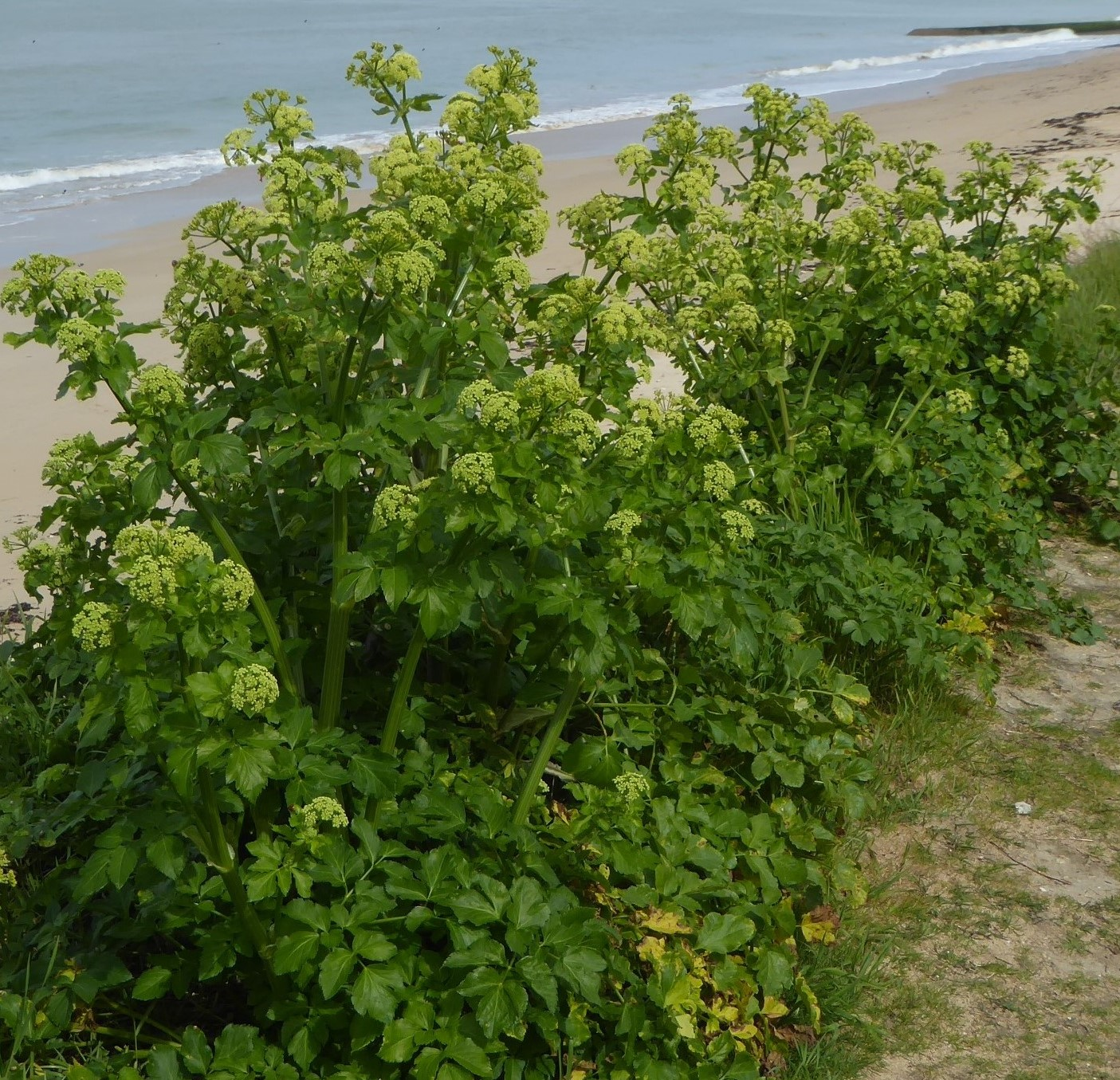

Conservation status
- Least Concern (IUCN 3.1)

Scientific classification
- Kingdom: Plantae
- Clade: Tracheophytes
- Clade: Angiosperms
- Clade: Eudicots
- Clade: Asterids
- Order: Apiales
- Family: Apiaceae
- Genus: Smyrnium
- Species: S. olusatrum

Binomial name
- Smyrnium olusatrum L.

= Smyrnium olusatrum =

Species of flowering plant

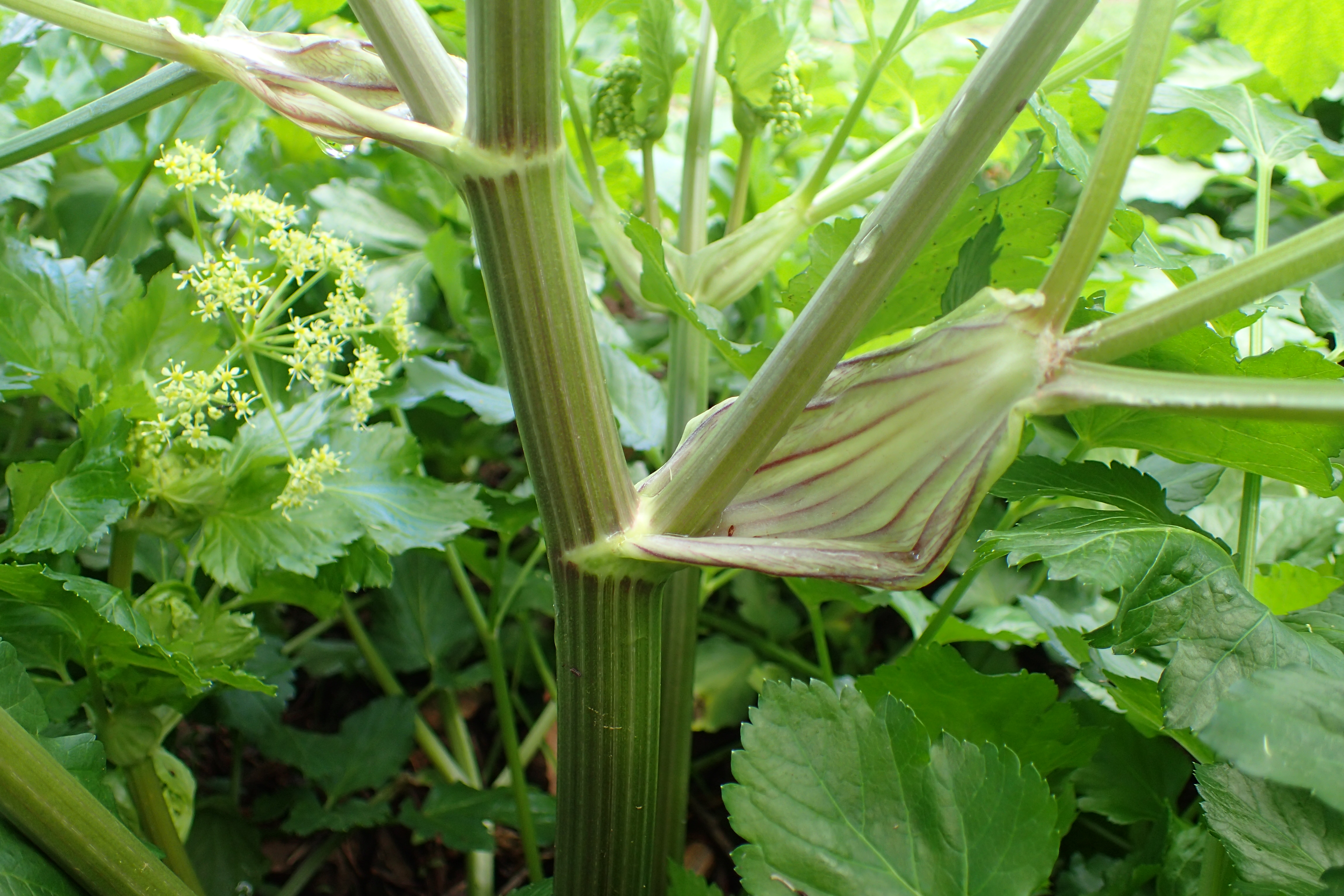
The base of the leaf stalks (petioles) is greatly expanded.

Smyrnium olusatrum, common name alexanders (or alisander), is an edible flowering plant of the family Apiaceae (Umbelliferae) which grows on waste ground and in hedges around the Mediterranean and Atlantic coastal regions of Europe. It was formerly widely grown as a pot herb, but is now appreciated mostly by foragers.

== Description ==
Smyrnium olusatrum is a stout, glabrous (hairless) biennial growing to 150 cm (60 in) tall (exceptionally 180 cm), with a solid stem up to 22 mm in diameter, which becomes hollow and grooved with age. It has a tuberous taproot which can be 60 cm long, as well as fibrous lateral roots.

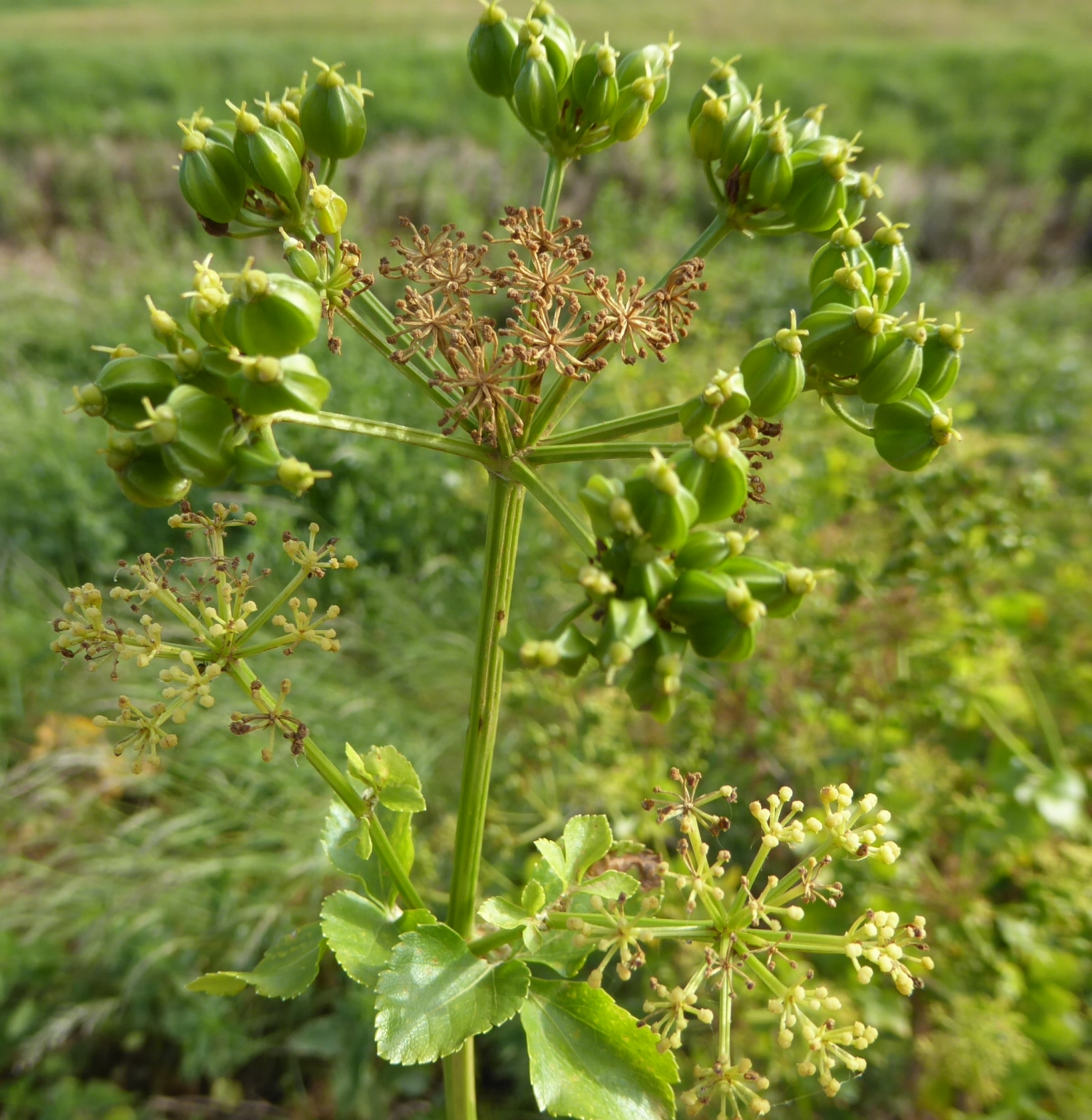
One lateral (top) and two tertiary umbels at fruiting, showing differing ratios of bisexual and male-only flowers.

The stem leaves are arranged in a spiral (although the upper cauline ones are often opposite and sometimes in whorls of 3), with an inflated, purple-striped, fleshy petiole that has papery margins towards the base. The compound leaves are broadly diamond-shaped, 2- or 3-times ternately (sometimes pinnately) divided. Sometimes they are slightly hairy towards the base. The individual leaflets are dark green above, pale green below, flat, lobed and serrated with obtuse teeth that have a tiny white hydathode at the tip.

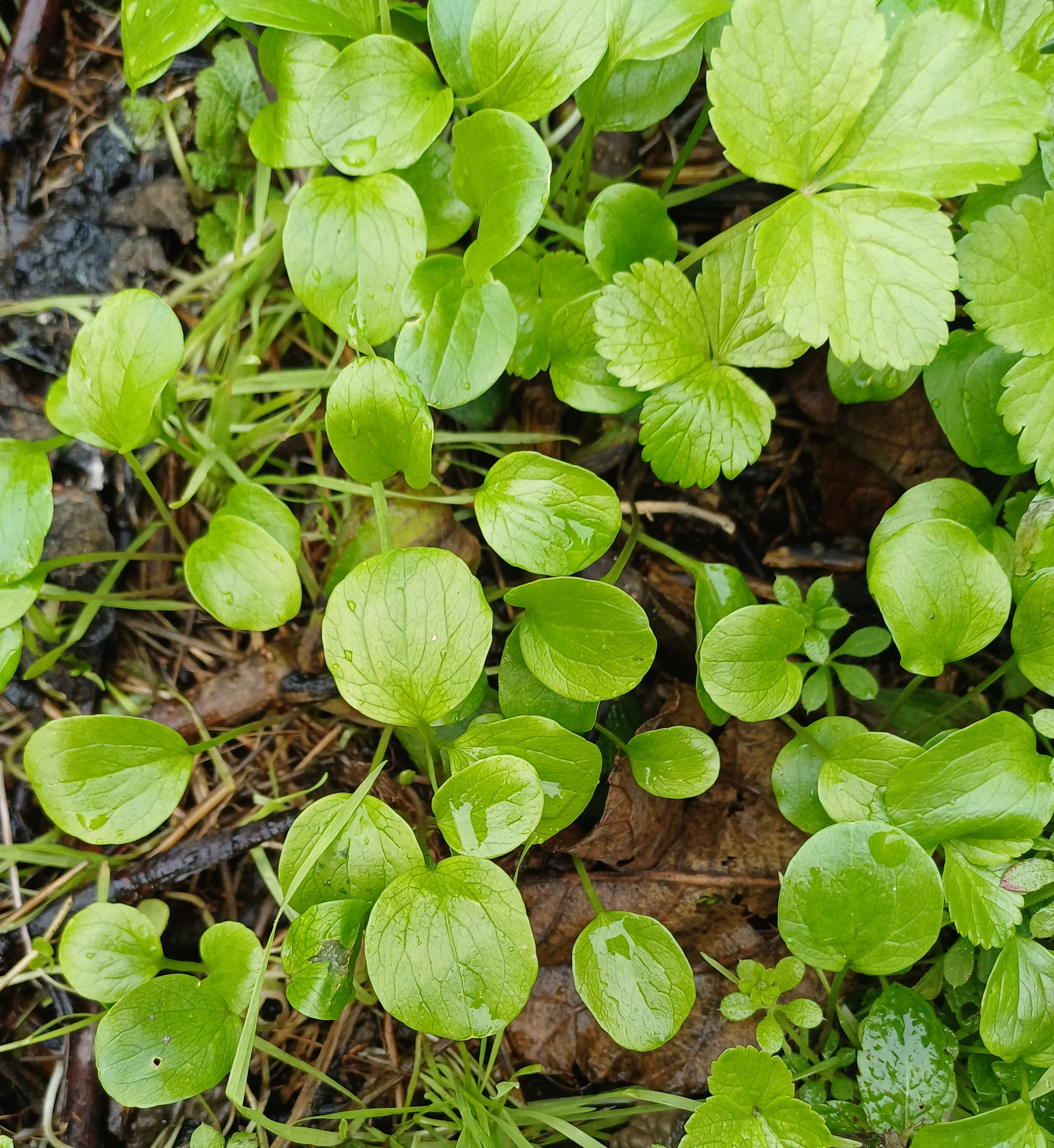
Seed leaves of alexanders in November

Inflorescences are terminal or in the leaf axils and consist of a compound umbel of individual umbels, the former 6–7 cm in diameter, with 5–25 penducle rays which are glabrous, ridged and 2–4 cm long. There are 3–4 bracts, which are small, pale and inconspicuous (or absent), and the peduncle is usually longer than its rays. The individual umbels are 1–2 cm across with 10–20 flowers and 1–5 tiny bracteoles. The actinomorphic flowers are small, with 5 yellowish petals and 5 tiny, green sepals, 5 stamens and (if present) 2 styles.

Sometimes there are 4 or 5 peduncles branching from the top of the stem, giving the impression of an umbel of umbels of umbels. Generally, it is only the terminal umbel that has 100% bisexual flowers; the lateral ones have both bisexual and male-only flowers (typically with the male umbellules in the centre), and the tertiary umbels often have only male flowers. This is best seen at maturity, when the male-only flowers wither without producing fruit.

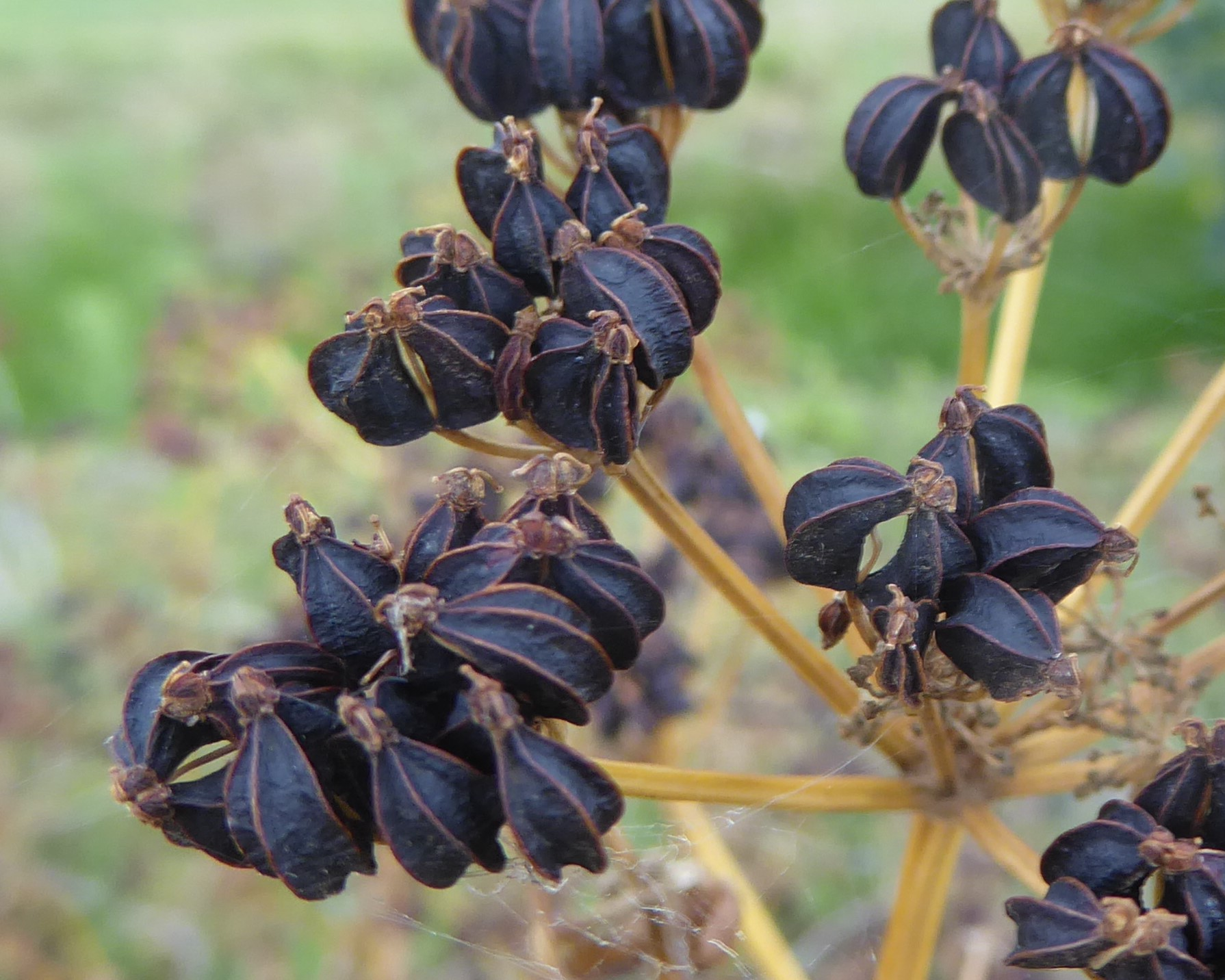
Mature fruits (schizocarps) splitting into two mericarps, revealing the carpophore between them.

The mature fruit is a black schizocarp 6.5–8 mm long, which splits into two single-seeded mericarps, revealing a stalk (the carpophore) that runs between them. Each mericarp has 3 ridges and numerous vittae (oil tubes), which exude a pungent oil which smells of capsicum or diesel. A single plant may produce between 3,000 and 9,000 seeds in a single year.

== Identification ==
There are few difficulties in recognising alexanders in northern Europe. Its compound ternate leaves are very distinctive, as are the yellow flowers. Amongst wild plants, it could possibly be confused with hemlock water-dropwort or wild celery but those species have white flowers. A commonly cultivated herb which does resemble it in its dark, shiny foliage is Lovage, which has more sharply toothed leaves, no latex in the petiole, and a more erect habit.

== Taxonomy ==
Smyrnium olusatrum is in one of the numerous genera that are assigned to the subfamily Apioideae within the carrot family. The Apioideae are characterised by highly divided leaves, a lack of stipules, the compound umbels, the presence of a stylopodium, and fruit with a membranous endocarp and vittae.

It was named by Carl Linnaeus in 1753 in Species Plantarum. Its name has remained unchanged since then, although the same plant has subsequently been given two other names (synonyms) which, as they came later, do not stand: Smyrnium maritimum Salisb. (in 1796) and Smyrnium vulgare Gray (1821). The plant was well known before Linnaeus's time but names pre-dating this are not used in botany; Linnaeus himself gave Hipposelinum theophrasti and Smyrnium dioscoridis as synonyms, citing Gaspard Bauhin's Pinax theatri botanici (1623). A type specimen has subsequently been designated (lectotype), which is at the Natural History Museum in London.

There are no named subspecies or varieties and it is not known to hybridise with any other species.

Its chromosome number is 2n = 22.

In older botanical works, the planet symbol for Mars (♂) sometimes appears by the name to show that the plant is a biennial.

The generic name Smyrnium is derived from μύρρα (múrrha) or σμύρνα (smúrna), the Greek words for myrrh. The epithet olusatrum was the Roman name of a plant, from the Latin words olus = 'herb' and ater = 'black'. The English name, alexanders, is a corruption of the Latin (olus ater ⇒ alisander) and does not have anything to do with Alexander the Great (nor does it warrant the use of an initial capital letter, although many sources do give it one). There are numerous other vernacular names for it, including allsander, alshinder, alick, skit, skeet, hellroot (a corruption of heal root), megweed, wild parsley, Macedonian parsley, wild celery, horse celery, stanmarch and black lovage.

In Italy it is commonly known as corinoli comune, or macerone, because it grows on rubble (macerie), and in Greece it is widely known as αγριοσέλινο (agriosélino), literally 'wild celery'.

== Distribution and status ==
Alexanders is widespread in Britain, where it is frequent in coastal areas in the south, becoming progressively rarer towards the north of Scotland, and absent from Orkney and Shetland. Inland, it is often found close to the sites of medieval monastery gardens and other historical places such as castles. In Ireland it is common around the south and east coasts, but rare inland and to the west.

Distribution of alexanders in Europe

More generally in Europe, it occurs throughout the Mediterranean, where it is recorded in all coastal areas, including the islands, and it extends as far as Crimea and the Black Sea. It is also found along the Atlantic coast of the continent from the Iberian Peninsula northwards through France, Belgium, the Netherlands, Denmark and (recently) into Norway; and westwards to the Azores. In north Africa it is restricted to the Mediterranean and Atlantic regions, including the Canary Islands.

The conservation status of alexanders in Britain and France is Least Concern, and it is not considered to be threatened in any region, although it is rare in some countries, such as Belgium.

It is recorded as an introduction in New Zealand, Australia and Bermuda.

It is a strictly lowland plant in northern Europe. In Britain, it is recorded no higher than 290 m, at Davidstow Airfield in Cornwall.

== Habitat and ecology ==
In Britain and the more northerly parts of Europe, the main habitat for alexanders is tall grassland, typically on road verges and woodland edges. It favours some soil disturbance initially, but once established it can be so dominant as to suppress most other plants. In the British National Vegetation Classification this habitat is described as a herb-rich type of MG1 false oat-grass community which, under other circumstances, would likely be dominated by cow parsley. A similar habitat occurs on the edges of scrub communities such as W21 hawthorn, W22 blackthorn or W24 bramble scrub. It is common on waste ground and field margins, especially near the sea, where it may also be found on cliff paths and near the shore.

Its Ellenberg values in Britain are L = 7, F = 5, R = 7, N = 7, and S = 0, which describe its requirements as fairly well-lit places on well-drained soils, neutral pH, medium fertility and no need for salinity. Although it is more common around the coast than inland, it has little tolerance for salt and its occurrence there may have more to do with milder temperatures found near the sea.

In France it is considered a characteristic species of seasonally dry river valleys with chaste tree scrub in the Mediterranean region. Elsewhere in the Mediterranean, its habitat is similarly associated with patches of bare ground, but it is also likely to be found in phrygana, olive groves and orchards.

The unspecialised flowers of alexanders are fragrant and are visited by a wide variety of insects. This is facilitated by the stylopodium, the bulbous base of umbellifer flowers, which secretes copious amounts of nectar that is easily available. In Britain, over 150 species have been recorded at the flowers, including many flies and bees, several beetles, butterflies and moths, and several other types of insect.

Plants are often infected with "alexanders rust", Puccinia smyrnii, which produces orange/yellow galls on both sides of the leaves and thickening of the stems, followed by dark brown telia on the undersides of the leaves only.

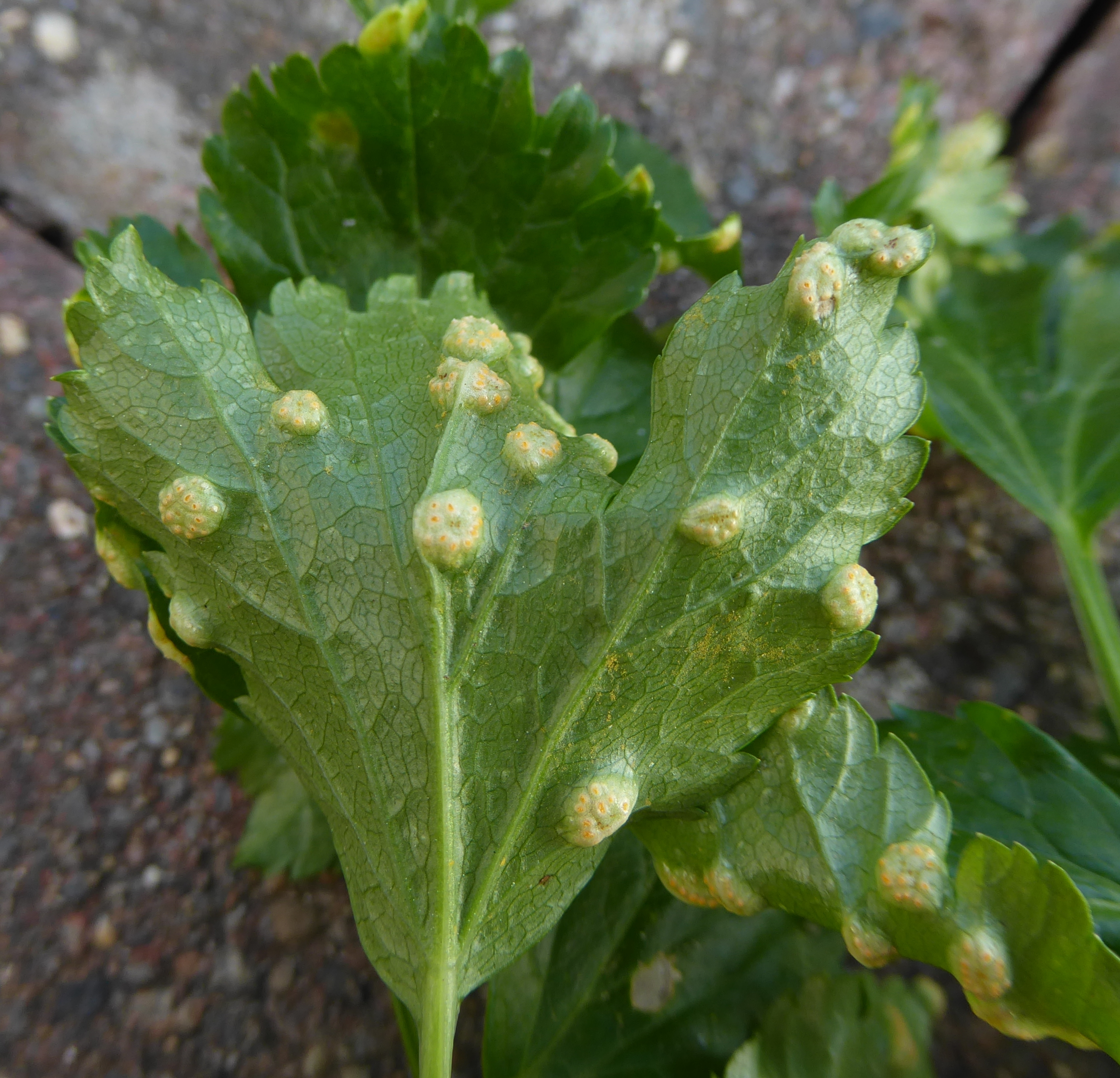
Blisters of alexanders rust, Puccinia smyrnii

There are at least nine species of insect which are found on alexanders in Britain and western Europe. Three produce leaf mines: the celery fly, Euleia heraclei, which creates dark patches on the leaf surface; a beetle, Orthochaetes insignis (Aube, 1863), whose larvae produce irregular tunnels; and another fly, Phytomyza smyrnii Spencer, 1954 (which has not been found in Britain but is known in Portugal), that creates linear mines.

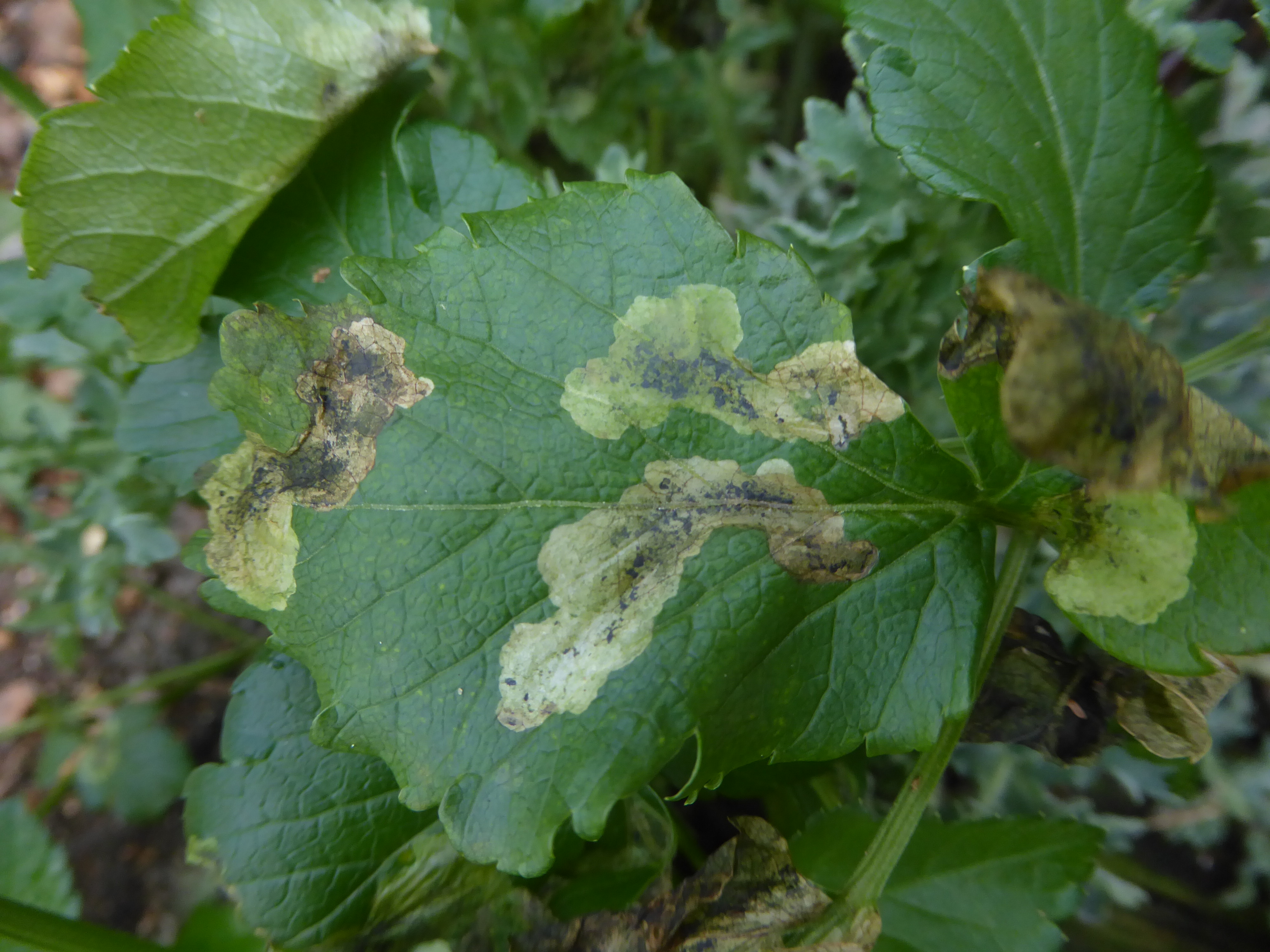
Leaf mines produced by Euleia heraclei larvae

Other phytophages include the obscure beetle Liophloeus tessulatus, which apparently eats the roots and leaves. Three are aphids, Dysaphis apiifolia (Theobald), D. crataegi (the hawthorn-carrot aphid) and D. lauberti (Borner, C.), which all suck the sap. The remaining two are micro-moths, Agonopterix heracliana, whose larvae spin the leaves, and Udea prunalis, whose caterpillars feed on the leaves.

== Uses ==
The plant is best collected before the flowers open and the stems can be cooked like asparagus. It was once highly valued in northern Europe as an early vegetable: one of the few fresh plants that can be eaten in February or March. In the west of Britain, it had a reputation amongst sailors of "clearing the blood" and curing scurvy, and in Dorset it was known as "helrut", which is possibly a corruption of "heal root". The seeds have also been used as a cure for scurvy.

One 17th-century text describes young shoots used in salads or a "vernal pottage" and an early 18th-century recipe recorded by Caleb Threlkeld for Irish Lenten Potage includes alexanders, watercress and nettles. In Turkey, where it is known as Baldiran or Göret, the young shoots and leaves are cooked and eaten with yoghurt, or eaten fresh as a salad, while the roots are also eaten, either cooked or fresh. These are considered to be the best part, and are dug up during the winter, when the tubers are most fleshy, although foragers in Britain often overlook them, as it is illegal to uproot wild plants. The young foliage is intermediate in flavor between celery and parsley and the seeds have an acrid, peppery taste. However, alexanders is botanically more closely related to carrot and chervil than to celery or parsley. It fell out of favour in the 18th century after celery started being mass produced to replace wild herbs and vegetables. It is not commonly used as a food product in the modern era, but has found some renewed use in exotic "foraged" food recipes and restaurants. It is also fed to livestock.

Rev. John Skinner reported that bundles of alexanders stalks from Steep Holm were used for fuel in the 19th century.

Although many authors claim that alexanders seeds smell of myrrh (presumably because of the name, Smyrnium) there are no documented reports of it being used as that. Studies have identified numerous aromatic compounds in various parts of the plant, but none is currently extracted for commercial purposes.

== In culture ==
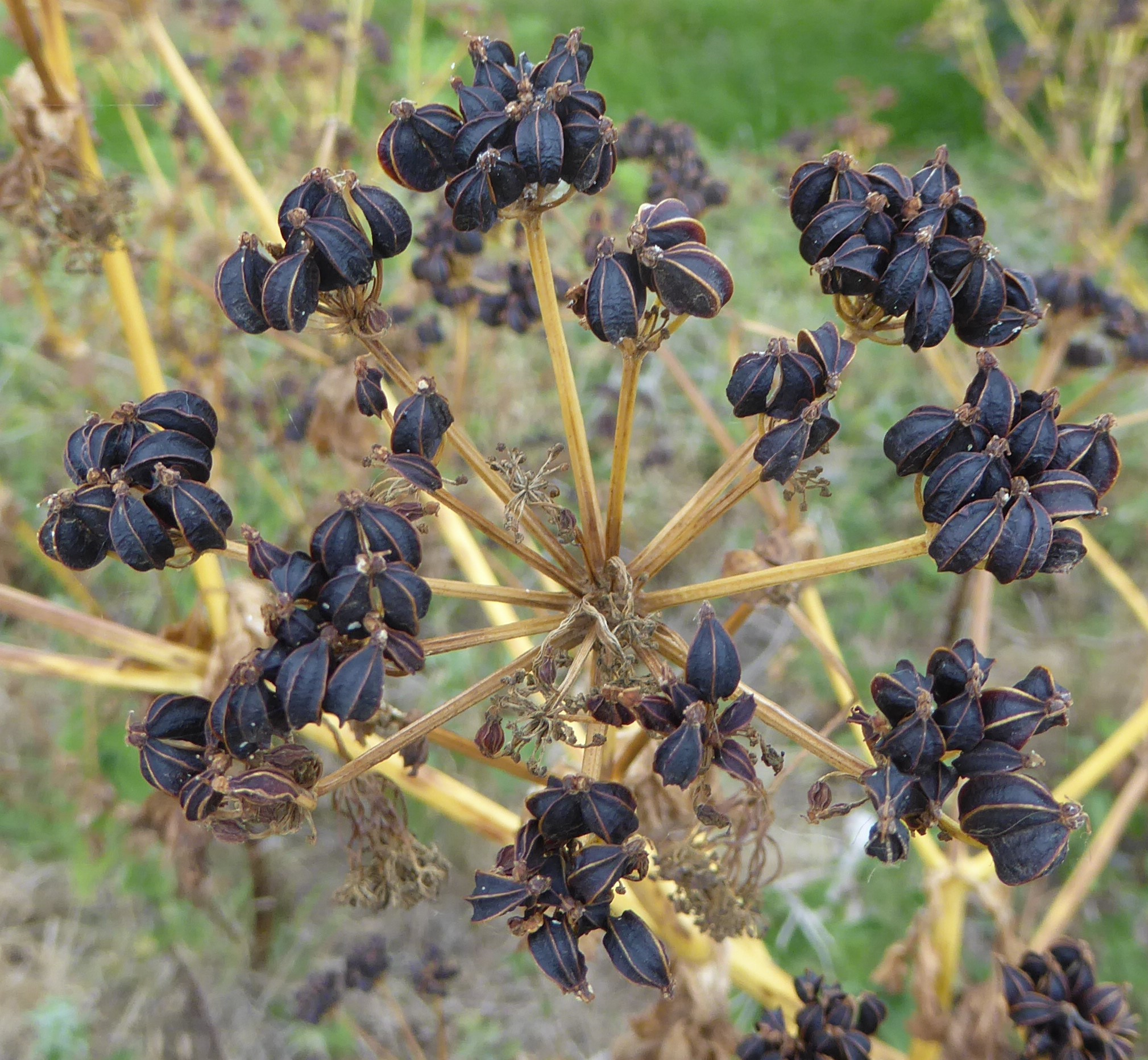
The mature fruits are black, which is possibly why it was believed to be the "black herb" of the Romans.

Alexanders is commonly supposed to be the herb described by Dioscorides as Hipposelinum, which the Romans called olusatrum. William Turner, writing in the late 16th century, explained how this was the accepted wisdom of his "masters", Antonius Musa, Fuchsius and Ruellius (referring to their herbals). However, after reading Dioscorides's De Materia Medica he realised that "our [i.e. English] Alexander is not Smyrniū in Dioscorides," because that species had paler leaves than parsley, a purplish colour, and a white root. Dioscorides himself had said as much, writing "Hipposelinum is different to that which is properly called smyrnium". It therefore appears as if the words "smyrnium'" and '"olusatrum" originally named different plants but were confused by European herbalists.

This confusion only deepened in the following years. In the mid-17th century Nicholas Culpeper explained that "alisander... is sold in apothecaries' shops as Macedonian parsley-seed." However, he acknowledged that it was grown in "all the gardens in Europe, and so well known, that it needs no farther description." John Ray explained in 1660 that alexanders was so called because in Italy and Germany it was known as herba alexandrina, having been supposed to have been brought from Alexandria.

Alexanders (i.e. modern Smyrnium olusatrum) is often described as being native to the Mediterranean and only introduced further north, but Randall points out that this is not based on any real evidence. The earliest find of alexanders in Britain is a seed found at a Roman site at Caerwent. This may be only because the pollen (which would normally provide palaeobotanical evidence) is difficult to identify. For this reason, and from the reading of Dioscorides, it is commonly said to have been introduced by the Romans. Some authors, however, treat it as native.

In Britain, the first record of alexanders as a living plant was by Turner in 1562. He wrote "Our Alexander groweth... in ilands compassed about the se between the far parte of Sommerset shere and Wales." The site mentioned may have been Steep Holm, where John Lightfoot also saw it in 1773.
