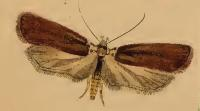

Scientific classification
- Kingdom: Animalia
- Phylum: Arthropoda
- Clade: Pancrustacea
- Class: Insecta
- Order: Lepidoptera
- Family: Depressariidae
- Genus: Agonopterix
- Species: A. cnicella

Binomial name
- Agonopterix cnicella (Treitschke, 1832)

Synonyms
- Haemylis cnicella Treitschke, 1832

= Agonopterix cnicella =

Species of moth

Agonopterix cnicella is a moth of the family Depressariidae. It is found in most of Europe, except Ireland, Fennoscandia, Portugal, the central part of the Balkan Peninsula, Latvia and Estonia. It has also been recorded from Morocco and Asia Minor.

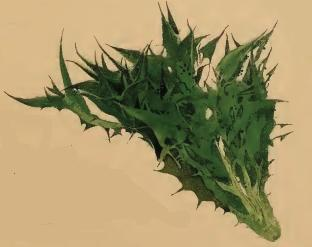
A shoot of Eryngium campestre attacked by larva

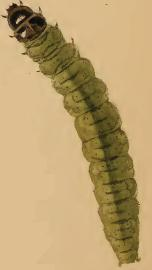
Larva

The wingspan is 18–22 mm. Adults are on wing from June to July.

The larvae feed on Eryngium species, including Eryngium maritimum and Eryngium campestre. Larvae can be found from May to the beginning of June.
