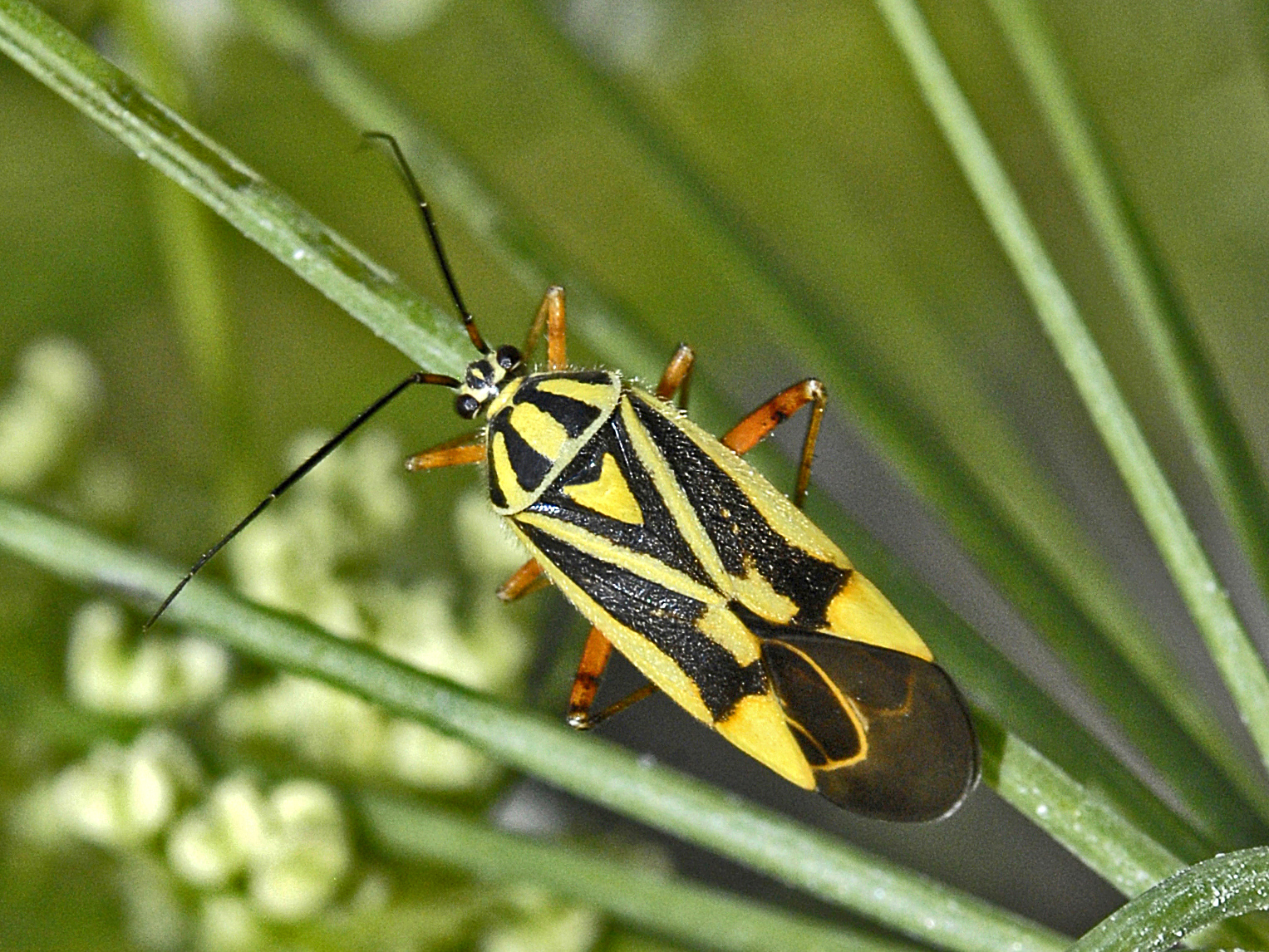
- Brachycoleus decolor

Scientific classification
- Kingdom: Animalia
- Phylum: Arthropoda
- Class: Insecta
- Order: Hemiptera
- Suborder: Heteroptera
- Family: Miridae
- Genus: Brachycoleus
- Species: B. decolor

Binomial name
- Brachycoleus decolor Reuter, 1887

Synonyms
- Brachycoleus bipunctatus Stichel, 1930; Brachycoleus decolor marginata Popov, 1965; Brachycoleus decolor ornata Stichel, 1957; Brachycoleus flavus Stichel, 1930; Brachycoleus marginatus Stichel, 1930; Brachycoleus ornatus Stichel, 1957; Brachycoleus scriptus (Fabricius, 1803); Brachycoleus scriptus bipunctata Stichel, 1930; Brachycoleus scriptus decolor Reuter, 1887; Brachycoleus scriptus flava Stichel, 1930; Brachycoleus scriptus marginata Stichel, 1930; Lygaeus scriptus Fabricius, 1803

= Brachycoleus decolor =

Species of true bug

Brachycoleus decolor is a species of plant-feeding insects of the family Miridae.

== Description ==
Brachycoleus decolor can reach a length of about 6.5–9 millimetres (0.26–0.35 in). These relatively large true bugs have a short and wide head. Body is covered with yellowish fine hairs. Legs are yellowish-orange. Pronotum and hemelytra show distinct longitudinal black markings on a pale yellow or green background.

== Distribution ==
This species is present in Russia, Austria, France, Germany, Italy, Macedonia, Poland, Siberia and Central Asia, Turkestan and Turkey.

== Habitat ==
Brachycoleus decolor lives in high-mountain deciduous forests, rocky grounds and pastures, at an elevation up to 1,300 metres (4,300 ft) above sea level.

== Biology ==
These true bugs mainly feed on Apiaceae, especially on parsnip (Pastinaca sativa), field eryngo (Eryngium campestre) and Peucedanum species. This species can be found, however, on spurge (Euphorbia spec.) and knapweeds (Centaurea spec.). Adults can be seen in June and July.
