= Z. laeta =

Z. laeta may refer to:

- Zuniga laeta, a jumping spider
- Zygaena laeta, a European moth
