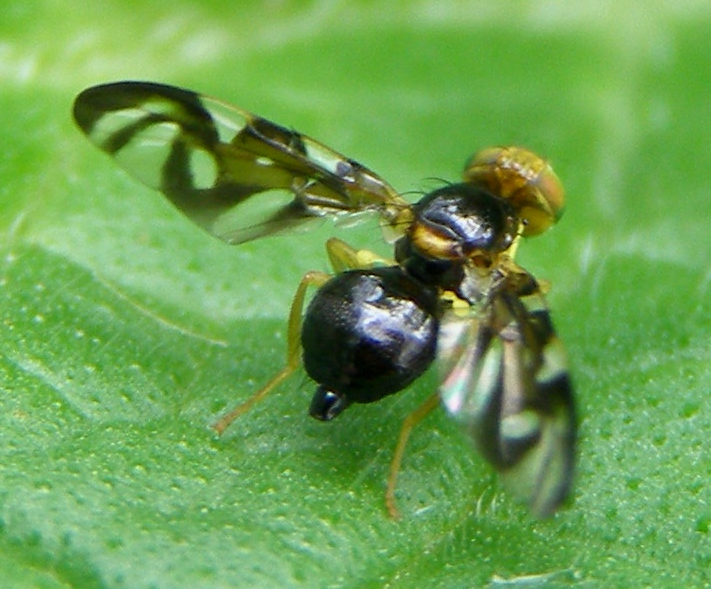
- Euleia heraclei

Scientific classification
- Kingdom: Animalia
- Phylum: Arthropoda
- Clade: Pancrustacea
- Class: Insecta
- Order: Diptera
- Family: Tephritidae
- Subfamily: Trypetinae
- Tribe: Trypetini
- Genus: Euleia; Walker, 1835

Synonyms
- Cryptaciura Hendel, 1927; Pterochile Richter & Kandybina, 1981; Odnosumyia Korneyev, 1991; Alcidia Woodworth, 1913

= Euleia =

Genus of flies

Euleia is a genus of tephritid or fruit flies in the family Tephritidae.

== Species ==
- Euleia acrotoxa
- Euleia basihyalina
- Euleia contemnens
- Euleia esakii
- Euleia fratria (Loew, 1862)
- Euleia fucosa
- Euleia heraclei (Linnaeus, 1758)
- Euleia incerta
- Euleia inconspicua
- Euleia kovalevi (Korneyev, 1991)
- Euleia latipennis
- Euleia lucens
- Euleia marmorea (Fabricius, 1805)
- Euleia nemorivaga
- Euleia nigriceps
- Euleia odnosumi (Korneyev, 1991)
- Euleia rotundiventris (Fallen, 1814)
- Euleia scorpioides (Richter & Kandybina, 1981)
- Euleia separata (Becker, 1908)
- Euleia setibasis Hering, 1953
- Euleia uncinata (Coquillett, 1899)
- Euleia unifasciata (Blanc & Foote, 1961)
