= Euleia odnosumi =

Scientific classification
- Kingdom: Animalia
- Phylum: Arthropoda
- Class: Insecta
- Order: Diptera
- Family: Tephritidae
- Genus: Euleia
- Species: E. odnosumi

Binomial name
- Euleia odnosumi (Korneyev, 1991)

Species of fly

Euleia odnosumi is a species of tephritid or fruit flies in the genus Euleia of the family Tephritidae.
