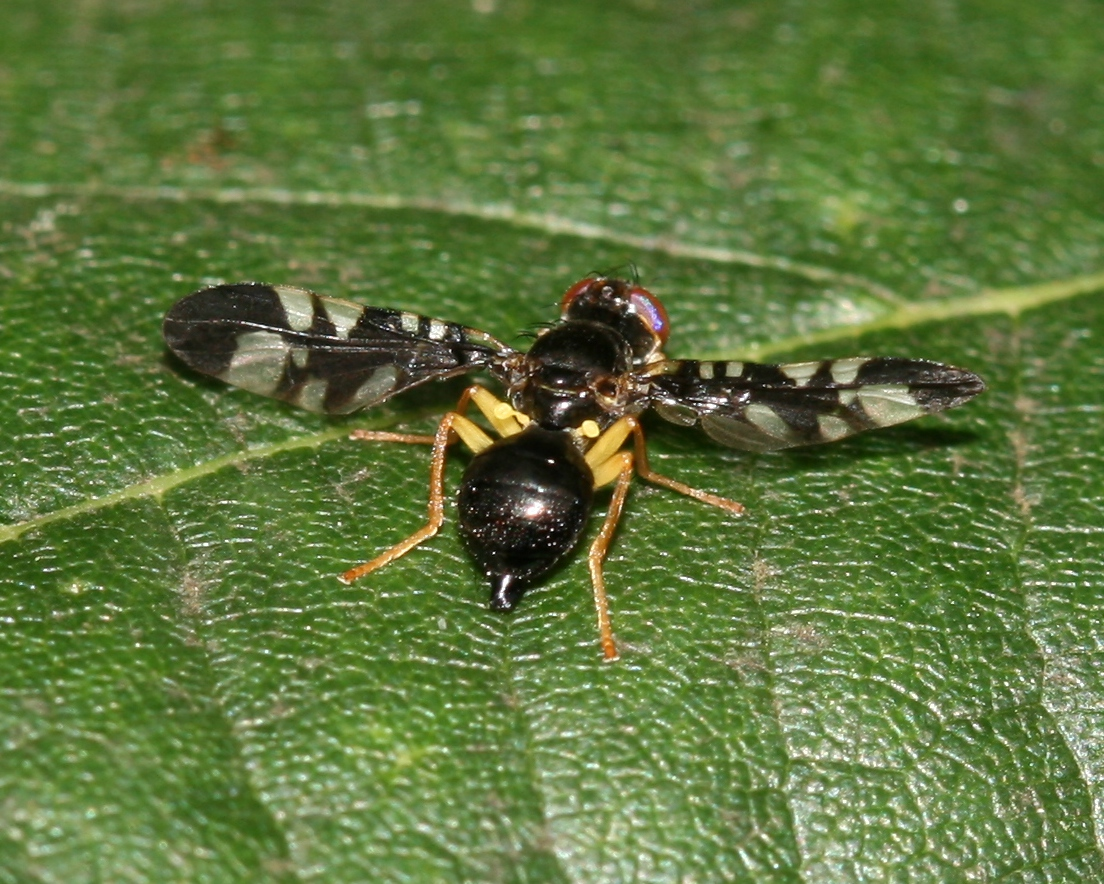

Scientific classification
- Kingdom: Animalia
- Phylum: Arthropoda
- Class: Insecta
- Order: Diptera
- Family: Tephritidae
- Genus: Euleia
- Species: E. rotundiventris

Binomial name
- Euleia rotundiventris (Fallen, 1814)

= Euleia rotundiventris =

Species of fly

Euleia rotundiventris is a species of tephritid or fruit flies in the genus Euleia of the family Tephritidae.
