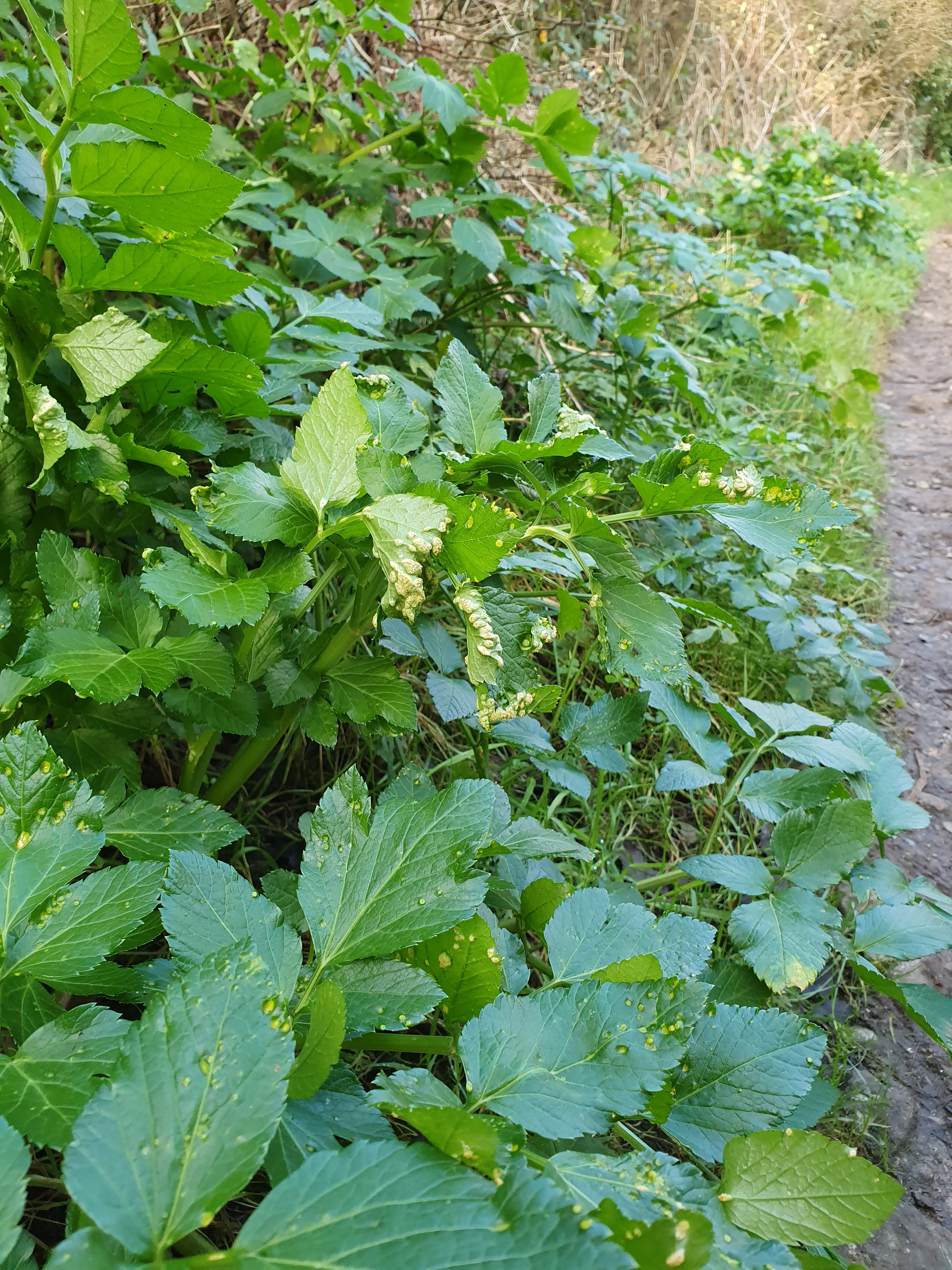
- Puccinia smyrnii (yellow dots) of leaves

Scientific classification
- Domain: Eukaryota
- Kingdom: Fungi
- Division: Basidiomycota
- Class: Pucciniomycetes
- Order: Pucciniales
- Family: Pucciniaceae
- Genus: Puccinia
- Species: P. smyrnii

Binomial name
- Puccinia smyrnii Bivona-Bernardi 1894

Synonyms
- List: Aecidium bunii var. smyrnii-olusatri DC., Fl. franç., Edn 3 (Paris) 5/6: 96 (1815); Aecidium smyrnii Bagnis, in Thümen, Mycoth. Univ., cent. 2: no. 153 (1875); Aecidium umbelliferarum G. Boyer & Jacz., Annls Ec. Agric. Montpellier: 22 (1894); Dicaeoma smyrnii (Biv.) Kuntze, Revis. gen. pl. (Leipzig) 3(3): 470 (1898); Puccinia smyrnii-olusatri (DC.) Lindr., Acta Soc. Fauna Flora fenn. 22(no. 4): 9 (1902); Uredo aecidiiformis Grev., Fl. Edin.: 441 (1824)

= Puccinia smyrnii =

Species of fungus

Puccinia smyrnii, or alexanders rust, is a fungus species and plant pathogen which causes rust on alexanders (Smyrnium olusatrum). It was originally found in Sicily. It is found in Europe and parts of north Africa.
