= Euleia kovalevi =

Scientific classification
- Kingdom: Animalia
- Phylum: Arthropoda
- Class: Insecta
- Order: Diptera
- Family: Tephritidae
- Genus: Euleia
- Species: E. kovalevi

Binomial name
- Euleia kovalevi (Korneyev, 1991)

Species of fly

Euleia kovalevi is a species of tephritid or fruit flies in the genus Euleia of the family Tephritidae.
