= Euleia latipennis =

Scientific classification
- Kingdom: Animalia
- Phylum: Arthropoda
- Class: Insecta
- Order: Diptera
- Family: Tephritidae
- Genus: Euleia
- Species: E. latipennis

Binomial name
- Euleia latipennis Chen, 1948

Species of fly

Euleia latipennis is a species of tephritid or fruit flies in the genus Euleia of the family Tephritidae.
