= Euleia separata =

Scientific classification
- Kingdom: Animalia
- Phylum: Arthropoda
- Class: Insecta
- Order: Diptera
- Family: Tephritidae
- Genus: Euleia
- Species: E. separata

Binomial name
- Euleia separata (Becker, 1908)

Species of fly

Euleia separata is a species of tephritid or fruit flies in the genus Euleia of the family Tephritidae.
