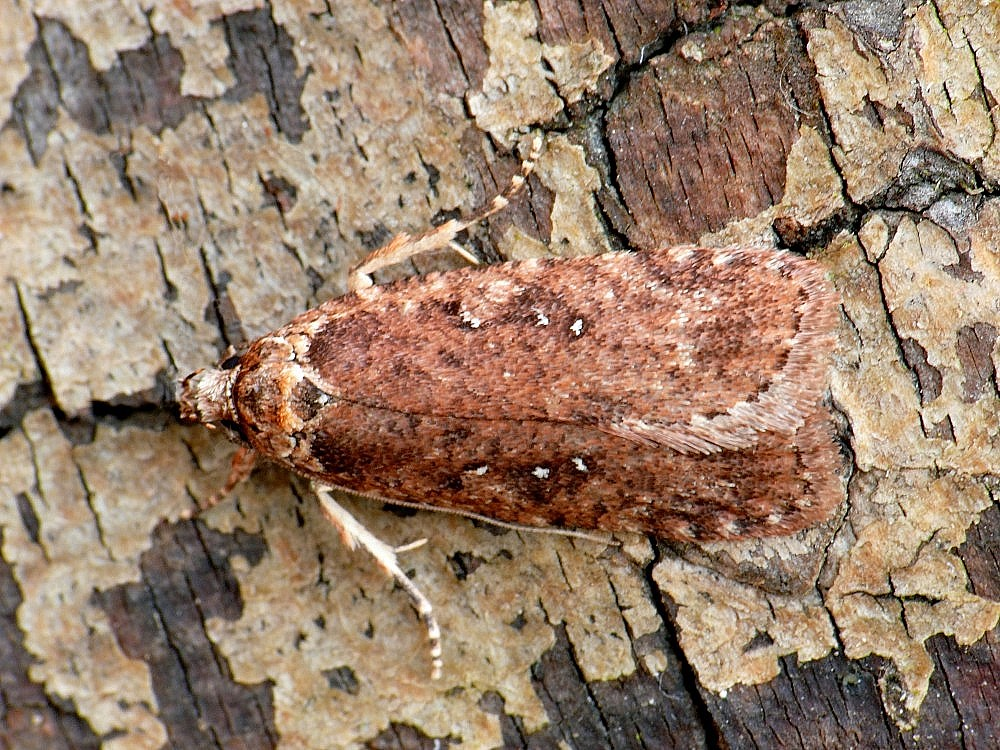

Scientific classification
- Kingdom: Animalia
- Phylum: Arthropoda
- Clade: Pancrustacea
- Class: Insecta
- Order: Lepidoptera
- Family: Depressariidae
- Genus: Agonopterix
- Species: A. heracliana

Binomial name
- Agonopterix heracliana (Linnaeus, 1758)

Synonyms
- List: Phalaena heracliana Linnaeus, 1758; Pyralis applana Fabricius, 1777; Tinea cicutella Hübner, 1796; Tinea heraclella Fabricius, 1798; Tinea applanella Fabricius, 1798; Depressaria heraclei Haworth, 1811; applanella Fischer von Röslerstamm, 1838; Depressaria uniformata Dufrane, 1949; Depressaria heracliella Doubleday, 1859; Phalaena vinalis Villers, 1789

= Agonopterix heracliana =

Species of moth

Agonopterix heracliana is a moth of the family Depressariidae. It is found in most of Europe, North Africa, the Near East, and the eastern part of the Palearctic realm. It was first described in 1758 by Carl Linnaeus in the 10th edition of Systema Naturae.

== Description ==
The wingspan is 17–25 mm. The terminal joint of palpi with two blackish bands. Forewings light greyish ochreous suffused with pale brownish; some dark fuscous dashes, most distinct before fascia; more conspicuous cloudy dashes in place of stigmata, second discal stigma sometimes including a whitish dot; a distinct pale acutely angulated fascia at 3/4; terminal blackish dots. Hindwings whitish fuscous. The larva is grey, on sides dull yellow; spots black; head and plate of 2 black

Adults are on wing from September to April.

The larvae spin the leaves of a variety of umbelliferous plants, including Heracleum sphondylium, Anthriscus sylvestris, Chaerophyllum temulum, and most other Umbelliferae including Angelica sylvestris, Aegopodium podagraria, Conopodium majus, Daucus, Meum, Myrrhis, Oenanthe, Pastinaca, Silaum, Sison, Smyrnium, Torilis and Ligusticum.

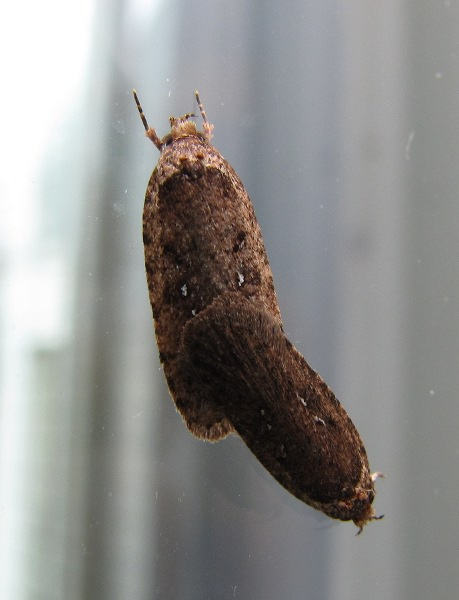
Mating

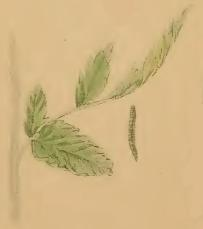
A leaf tip of Anthriscus sylvestris folded by larva

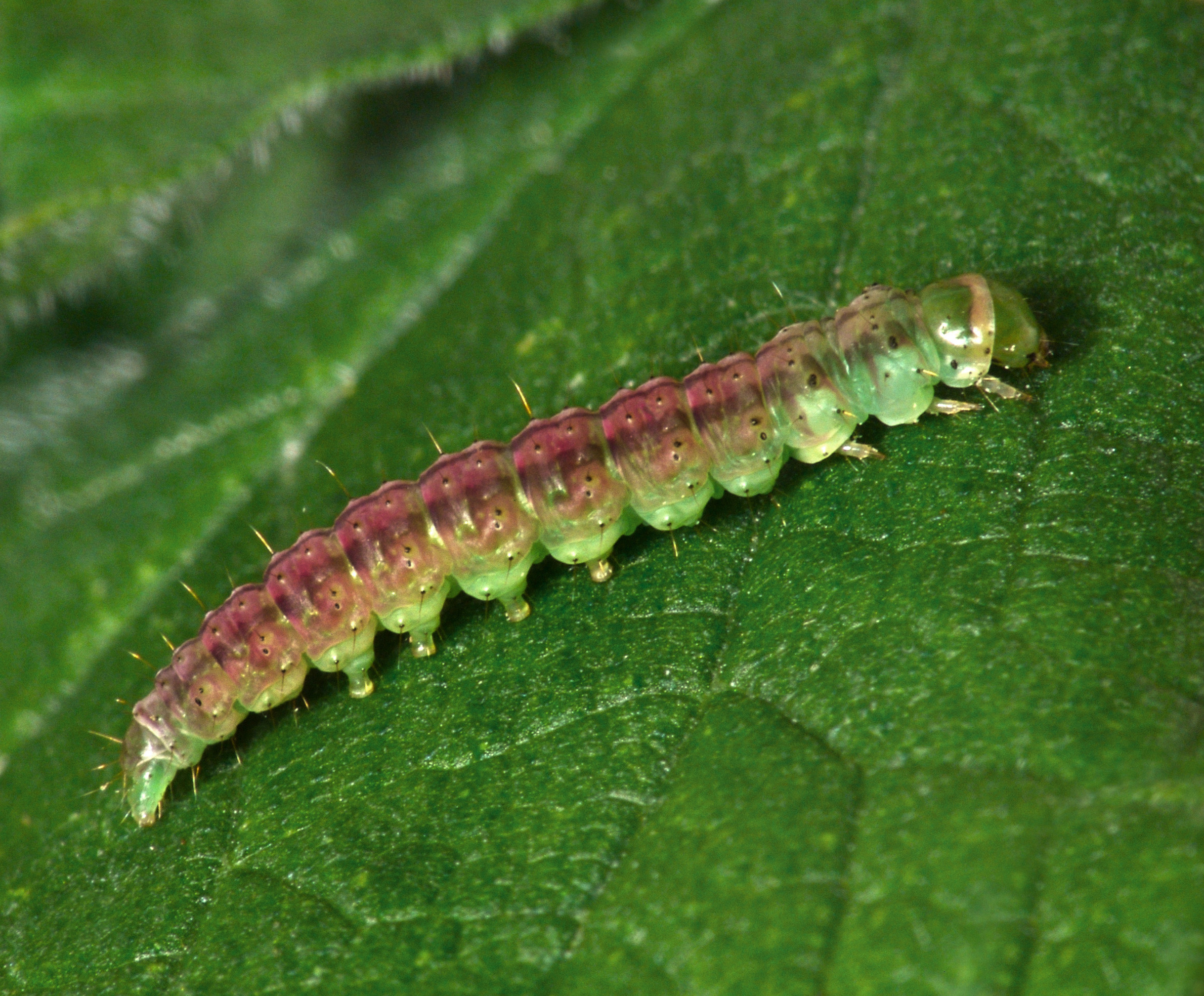
Pre-pupation larva

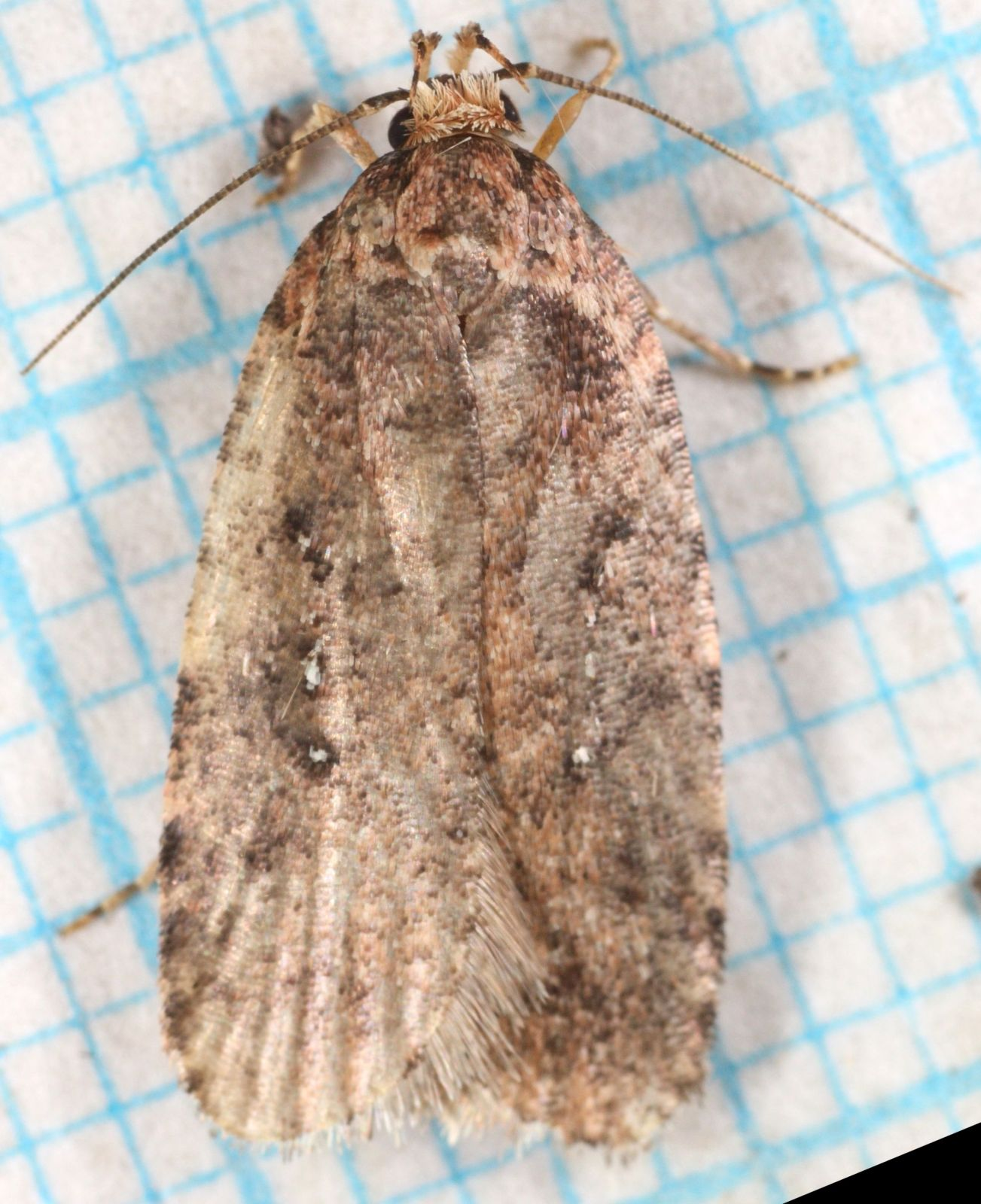
