= Euleia lucens =

Scientific classification
- Kingdom: Animalia
- Phylum: Arthropoda
- Class: Insecta
- Order: Diptera
- Family: Tephritidae
- Genus: Euleia
- Species: E. lucens

Binomial name
- Euleia lucens Munro, 1935

Species of fly

Euleia lucens is a species of fruit flies in the genus Euleia of the family Tephritidae.
