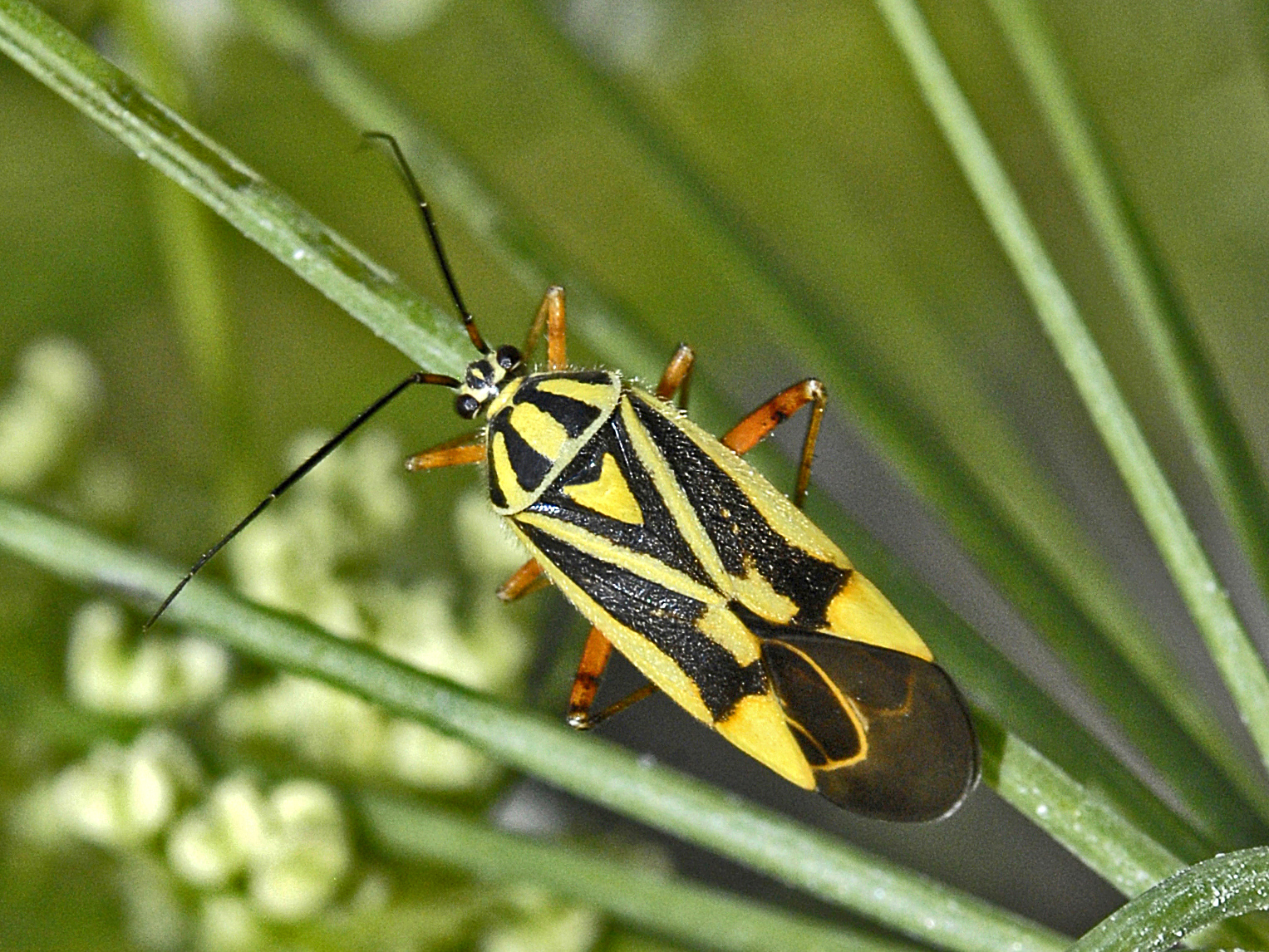
- Brachycoleus decolor

Scientific classification
- Kingdom: Animalia
- Phylum: Arthropoda
- Class: Insecta
- Order: Hemiptera
- Suborder: Heteroptera
- Family: Miridae
- Tribe: Mirini
- Genus: Brachycoleus

= Brachycoleus =

Genus of true bugs

Brachycoleus is a genus of plant-feeding insects of the family Miridae.

== Species ==
Species within this genus include:

- Brachycoleus bolivari Horvath, 1901
- Brachycoleus decolor Reuter, 1887
- Brachycoleus lineellus Jakovlev, 1884
- Brachycoleus pilicornis (Panzer, 1805)
- Brachycoleus sexvittatus Reuter, 1877
- Brachycoleus steini Reuter, 1877
- Brachycoleus triangularis (Goeze, 1778)

== Description ==
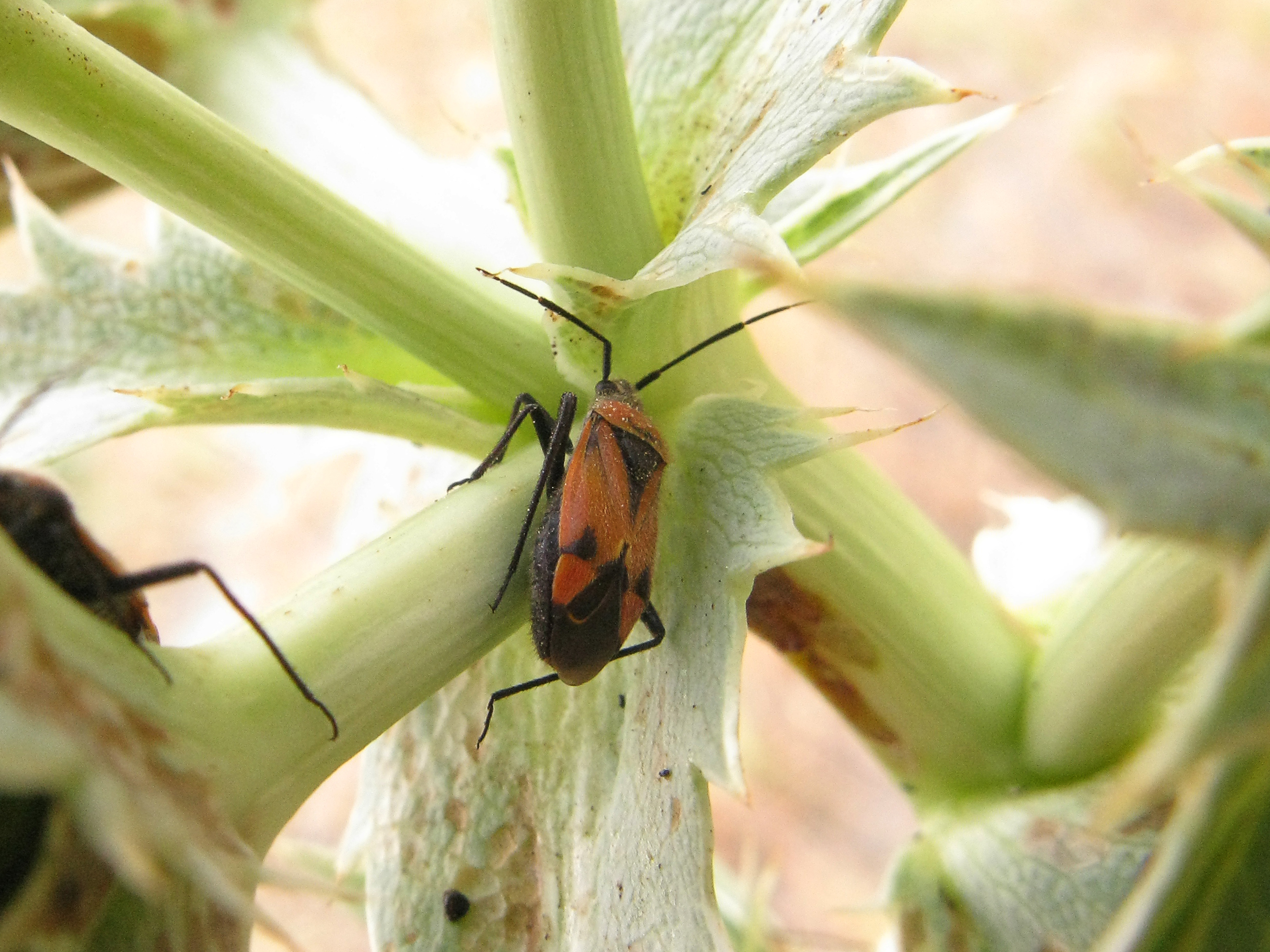
Brachycoleus triangularis

Species within this genus are quite large and broad. Males usually are more slender than females. The head is wide and short. Bodies are covered with erect and semierect yellowish fine hairs. The basic color may be mainly red, orange and yellow, with black markings.
