= Euleia fratria =

Scientific classification
- Domain: Eukaryota
- Kingdom: Animalia
- Phylum: Arthropoda
- Class: Insecta
- Order: Diptera
- Family: Tephritidae
- Genus: Euleia
- Species: E. fratria

Binomial name
- Euleia fratria (Loew, 1862)

Species of fly

Euleia fratria is a species of tephritid or fruit flies in the genus Euleia of the family Tephritidae. The species was first classified in 1862, and is native to North America. Adults have been reared from Angelica atropurpurea, Angelica hendersonii, Cicuta douglasii, and numerous other Apiaceae plants. Larvae are leaf miners, and may pupate within their host plant or in soil.
