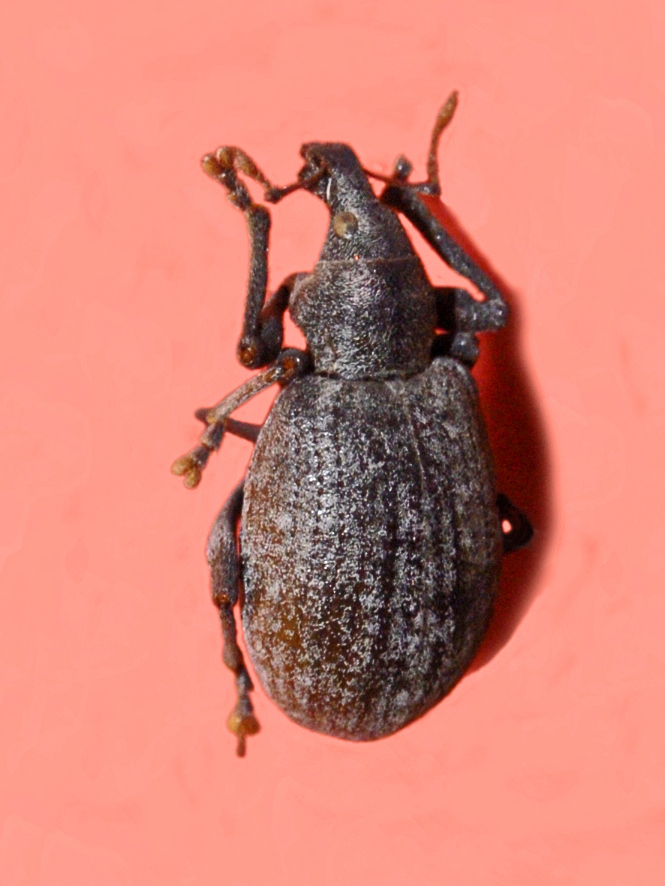
- Liophloeus tessulatus

Scientific classification
- Domain: Eukaryota
- Kingdom: Animalia
- Phylum: Arthropoda
- Class: Insecta
- Order: Coleoptera
- Suborder: Polyphaga
- Infraorder: Cucujiformia
- Family: Curculionidae
- Genus: Liophloeus; Germar, 1824

= Liophloeus =

Genus of beetles

Liophloeus is a genus of weevils in the subfamily Entiminae.

== Subgenera and species ==
- Liophloeodes Weise, 1894
  - Liophloeus chrysopterus Boheman, 1842
  - Liophloeus gibbus Boheman, 1842
  - Liophloeus herbstii Gyllenhal, 1834
  - Liophloeus kiesenwetteri Tournier, 1889
  - Liophloeus laevifron s Petri, 1912
  - Liophloeus lentus Germar, 1824
  - Liophloeus liptoviensis Weise, 1894
  - Liophloeus pupillatus Apfelbeck, 1928
- Liophloeus Germar, 1824
  - Liophloeus ophthalmicus Stierlin, 1889
  - Liophloeus paulinoi Desbrochers, 1875
  - Liophloeus tessulatus (O.F. Müller, 1776)
