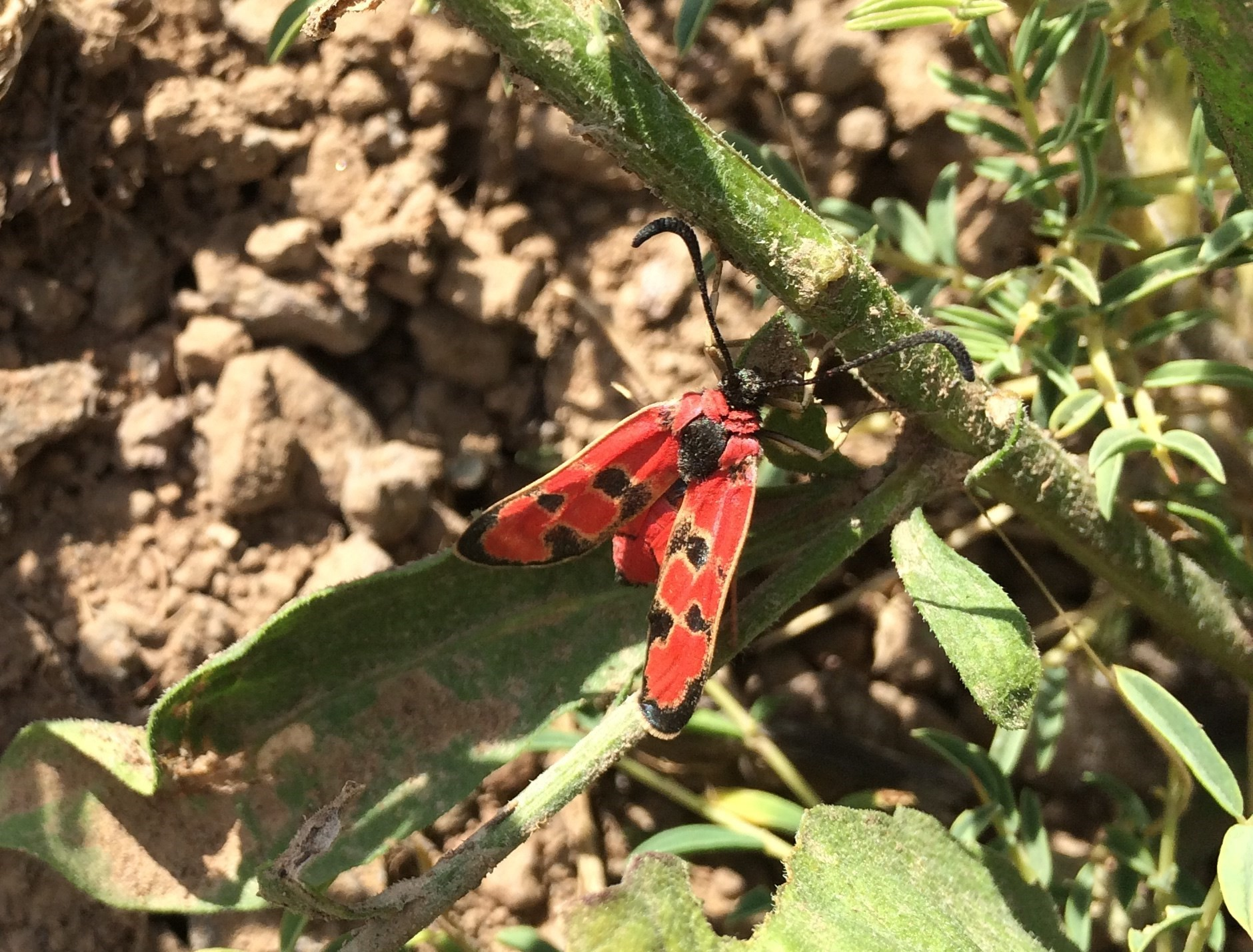

Scientific classification
- Kingdom: Animalia
- Phylum: Arthropoda
- Clade: Pancrustacea
- Class: Insecta
- Order: Lepidoptera
- Family: Zygaenidae
- Genus: Zygaena
- Species: Z. laeta

Binomial name
- Zygaena laeta (Hübner, 1790)

Synonyms
- Sphinx laeta Hübner, 1790

= Zygaena laeta =

Species of moth

Zygaena laeta, the bloodword burnet, is a moth of the family Zygaenidae.

== Distribution ==
It is found in Central and South-Eastern Europe.

== Description ==
In Z. laeta the collar and patagia as well as the apical half (or more) of the abdomen are red: also the wings are testaceous red except some black spots on the forewing. Larva of light bluish green, with while dorsal and lateral lines, along which there are blackdots. Pupa yellow, anteriorly dark brown, in a whitish cocoon. The wingspan is 26–34 mm.

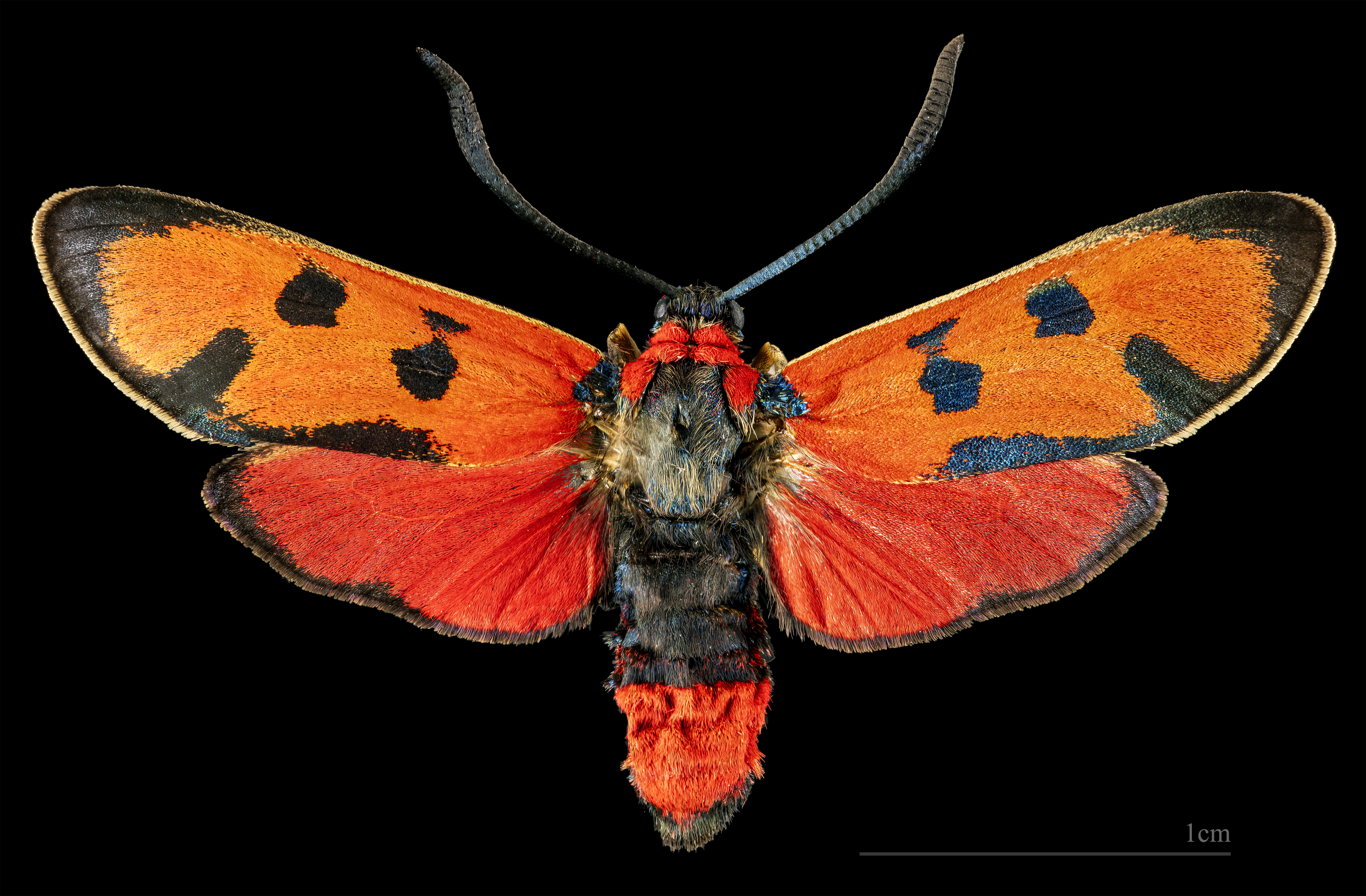
♂

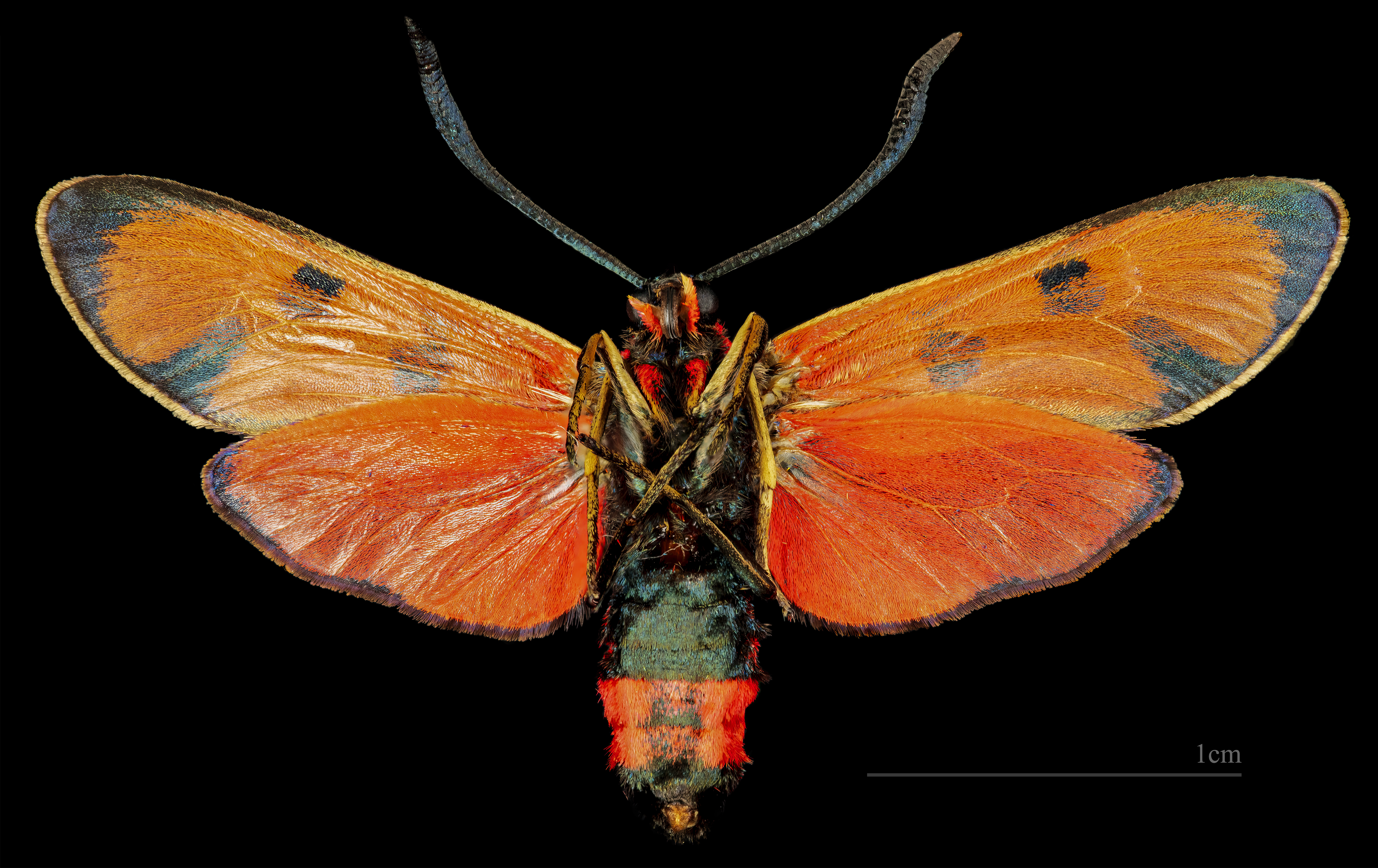
♂ △

== Biology ==
The moth flies from July to August, depending on the location, on dry hill-sides, During their slow flight the red abdomen is especially conspicuous, the flying insect bearing on that account a distant resemblance to certain southern Hemiptera.

The larva mainly feed on Eryngium campestre.

== Subspecies ==
- Zygaena laeta laeta
- Zygaena laeta orientis Burgeff, 1926
