= Euleia marmorea =

Scientific classification
- Domain: Eukaryota
- Kingdom: Animalia
- Phylum: Arthropoda
- Class: Insecta
- Order: Diptera
- Family: Tephritidae
- Genus: Euleia
- Species: E. marmorea

Binomial name
- Euleia marmorea (Fabricius, 1805)

Species of fly

Euleia marmorea is a species of tephritid or fruit flies in the genus Euleia of the family Tephritidae.
