= Euleia esakii =

Scientific classification
- Kingdom: Animalia
- Phylum: Arthropoda
- Class: Insecta
- Order: Diptera
- Family: Tephritidae
- Genus: Euleia
- Species: E. esakii

Binomial name
- Euleia esakii Ito, 1960

Species of fly

Euleia esakii is a species of tephritid or fruit flies in the genus Euleia of the family Tephritidae.
