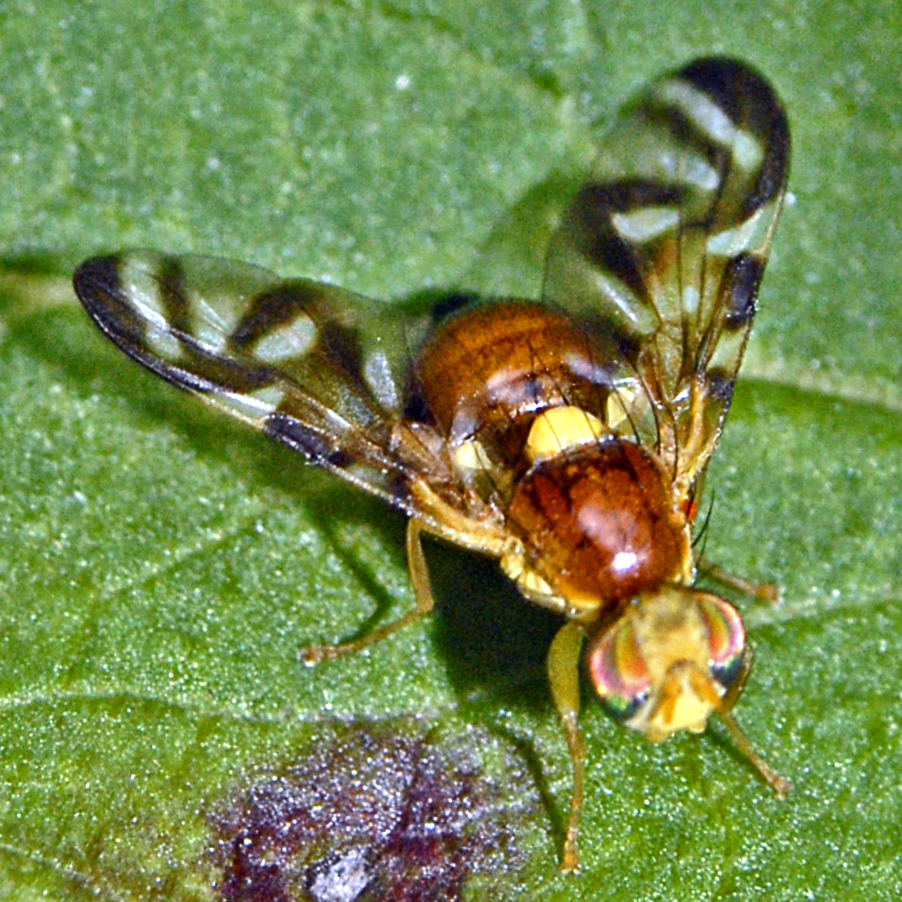
- Euleia heraclei. Dorsal view

Scientific classification
- Kingdom: Animalia
- Phylum: Arthropoda
- Class: Insecta
- Order: Diptera
- Family: Tephritidae
- Genus: Euleia
- Species: E. heraclei

Binomial name
- Euleia heraclei (Linnaeus, 1758)

Synonyms
- List: Acinia herachlei Lioy, 1864; Euleia centauriae Foote, 1984; Euleia heraclei f. spadicea Ito, 1984; Euleia heracleii Foote, 1984; Euleia hercclei Foote, 1984; Euleia spadicea Ito, 1984; Forellia dauci Robineau-Desvoidy, 1830; Musca centaureae Fabricius, 1794; Musca heraclii Linnaeus, 1758; Musca onopordinis Fabricius, 1775; Musca subcutanea Turton, 1801; Philophylla heraclei f. spadicea Ito, 1956; Philophylla spadicea Ito, 1956; Trupanea berberidis Schrank, 1803; Trupanea onopordi Schrank, 1803; Trypeta heraclei Loew, 1844

= Euleia heraclei =

Species of fly

Euleia heraclei, known as the celery fly or the hogweed picture-wing fly, is a species of tephritid or fruit flies in the family Tephritidae.

== Distribution ==
This species is widespread in most of Europe (Austria, Belgium. Bulgaria, Czech Republic, Denmark, Estonia, Finland, France, Germany, Great Britain, Greece, Hungary, Ireland, Italy, Latvia, Moldova, the Netherlands, Norway, Poland, Romania, central European Russia, Slovakia, Spain, Switzerland, Sweden, and Ukraine) and in the eastern Palearctic realm, in Central Asia (Afghanistan, Kazakhstan, Kyrgyzstan, Tajikistan, Turkmenistan, and Uzbekistan), and Japan. It is also present in North Africa (Algeria, Morocco) and in the Middle East (Turkey, Armenia, Azerbaijan, Georgia, Iran, Israel).

In Britain, the species is distributed widely across southern and central England; in Wales records are mainly near the coast.

== Habitat ==
These small flies mainly inhabit vegetable gardens and open countrysides where the host plants grow.

== Description ==
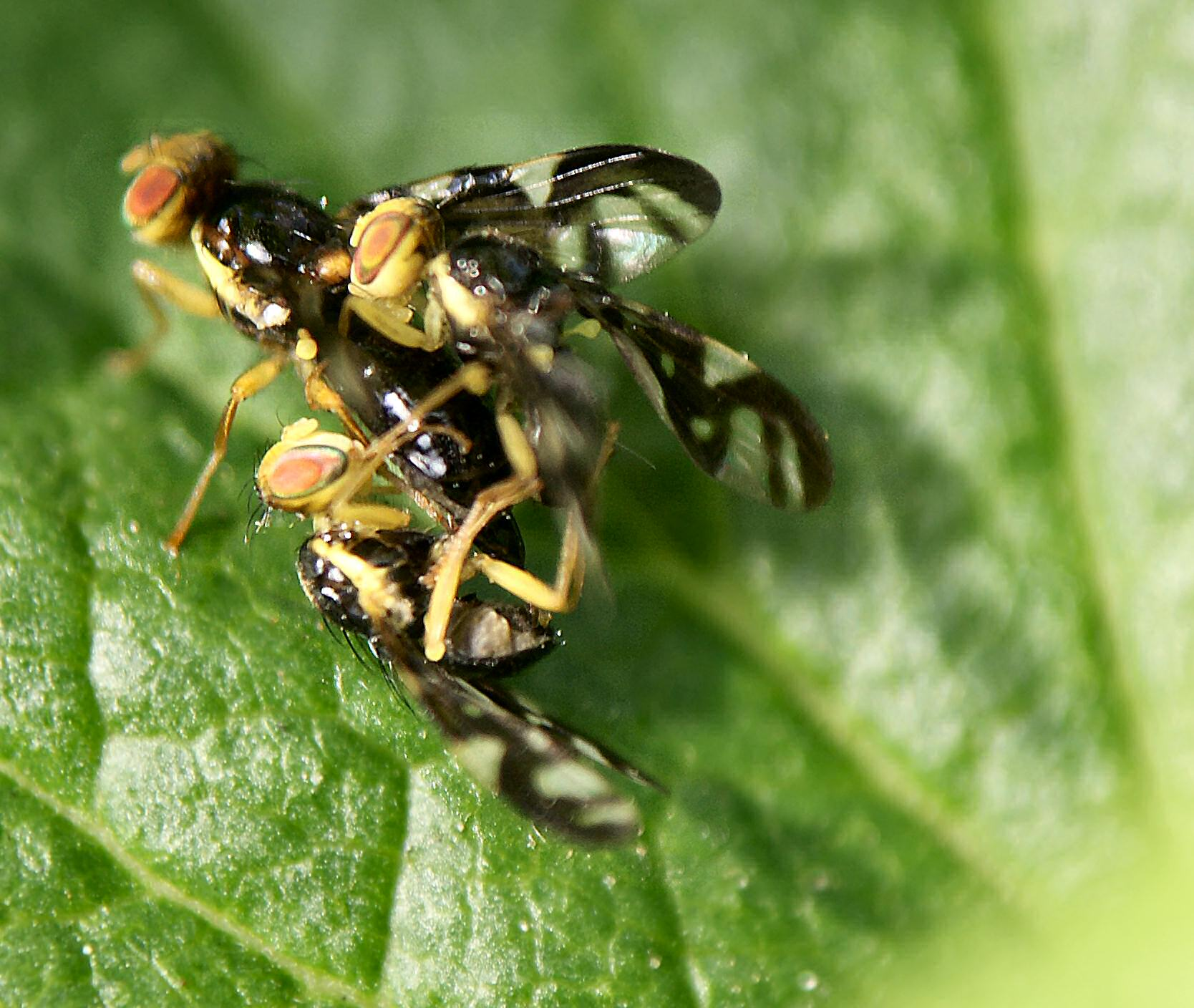
Group of Euleia heraclei mating

Euleia heraclei can reach a body length of 5–7 mm (0.20–0.28 in). The species is dimorphic, as the color of the body is variable depending on the season. In fact the thorax and the abdomen may be shiny orange-brown or blackish. They are almost black for the winter flies, while they are clear, orange-brown for the summer flies. The sides of the mesonotum have whitish longitudinal stripes. The postscutellum is black. The head has blue-green eyes. The face shows a raised longitudinal rib. These flies have rather wide wings heavily marked with brown bands. The legs are yellow-brown. Eggs are oval, white. Larvae are white, spindly shaped, up to 8 mm long.

Video clip

== Biology ==
Euleia heraclei is a bivoltine species, with two generations per year. Adults can be found from April to November feeding on hogweed (Heracleum species) (hence the specific name).

The males display on the upper surfaces of leaves on sunny days during April–May. Mating takes place when a female arrives. The females' winter fly lay the eggs in April and May into the leave of the host plants, a few eggs in one leaf. After 6–8 days, the eggs hatch and the larvae mine the leaves, initially in a short corridor and later, a yellow or brown blotch. After four weeks, adult larvae enter into the soil at a depth of 4–5 cm. The second generation develops in September–October and overwinters in the upper layers of soil, at a depth of about 10 cm.

Larvae feed on the leaves of a wide variety of plants, especially of Apiaceae species (Heracleum sphondylium, Angelica sylvestris, Apium graveolens, Apium nodiflorum, Conium maculatum, Heracleum sphondylium, Pastinaca sativa, Smyrnium olusatrum, Ammi species, Anthriscus cerefolium, Berula erecta, Bupleurum species, Cicuta virosa, Coriandrum sativum, Daucus carota, Eryngium campestre, Falcaria vulgaris, Heracleum mantegazzianum, Levisticum officinale, Ligusticum scoticum, etc.).

They are considered a pest of celery (Apium graveolens) and parsnips (Pastinaca sativa), where they damage the plant by mining the leaves.
