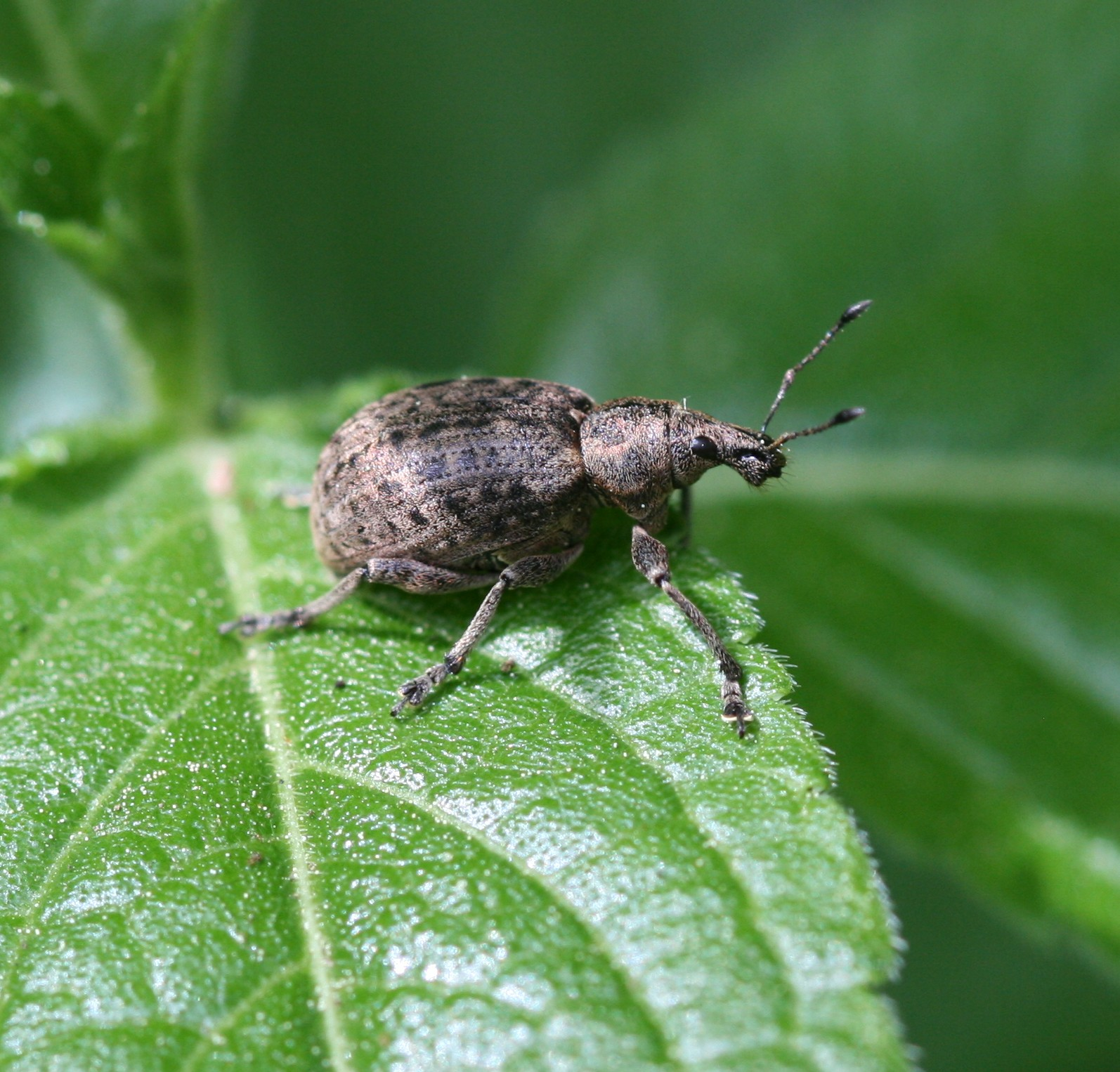

Scientific classification
- Kingdom: Animalia
- Phylum: Arthropoda
- Clade: Pancrustacea
- Class: Insecta
- Order: Coleoptera
- Suborder: Polyphaga
- Infraorder: Cucujiformia
- Family: Curculionidae
- Genus: Liophloeus
- Species: L. tessulatus

Binomial name
- Liophloeus tessulatus (Müller, 1776)

= Liophloeus tessulatus =

Species of beetle

Liophloeus tessulatus is a species of beetle belonging to the family Curculionidae. It reaches up to around 10 mm in length. The species was scientifically described in 1776 by Otto Friedrich Müller as Curculio tessulatus. It was also described as Liophloeus schmidti (Boheman, 1824).

The species feed on a variety of wild plants including Creeping Thistle, Cow Parsley, Hogweed, Ivy and Colt's-foot. The larva develop on the roots of these plants where they take two years to grow into adults.

It reproduces parthenogenically at lower altitudes.

== Occurrence ==
The species is widespread in Europe. Its range stretches north to southern Norway, central Sweden and southern Finland. Adults are mostly found from spring until late summer.

== Gallery ==
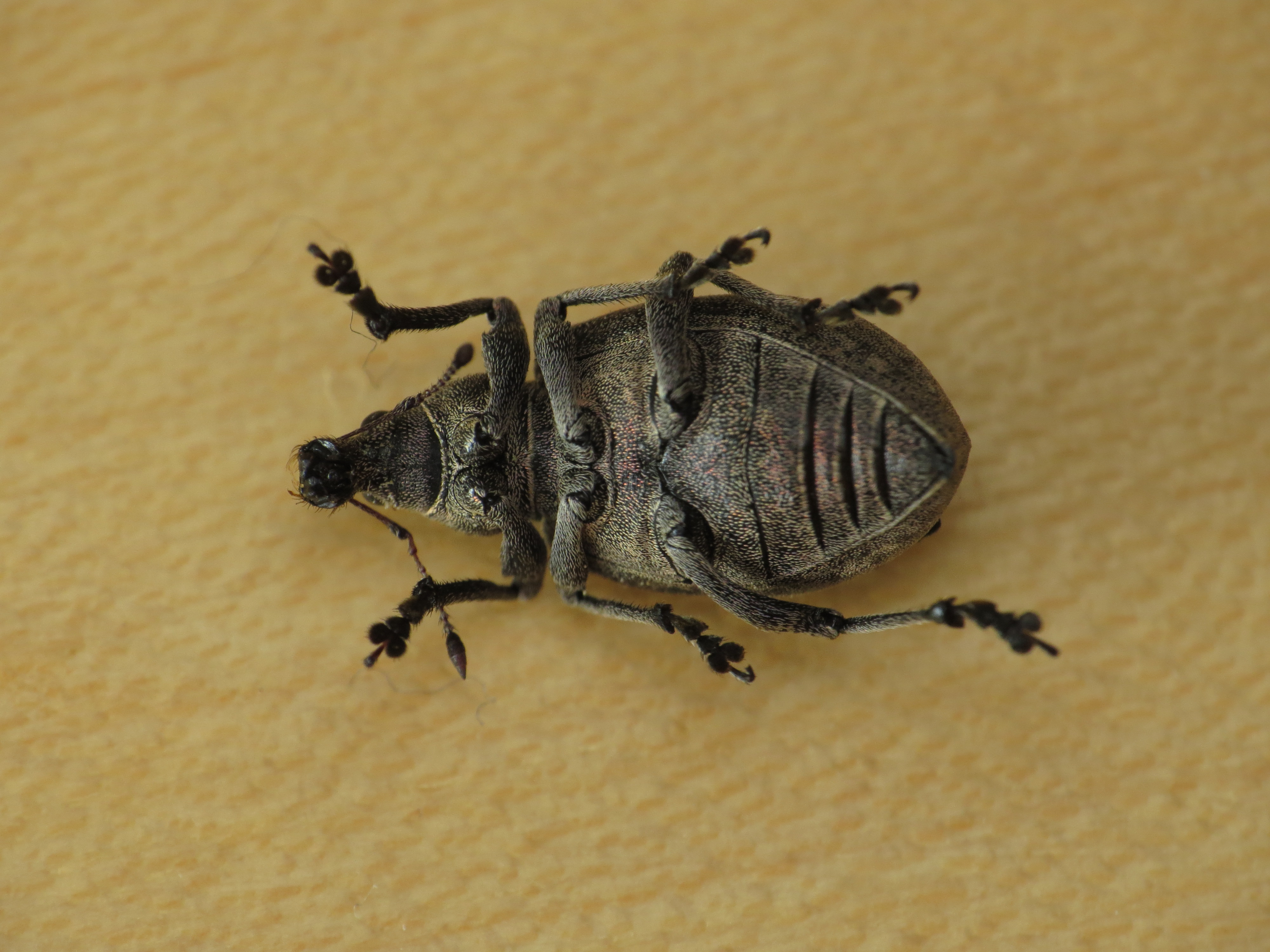
Ventral view

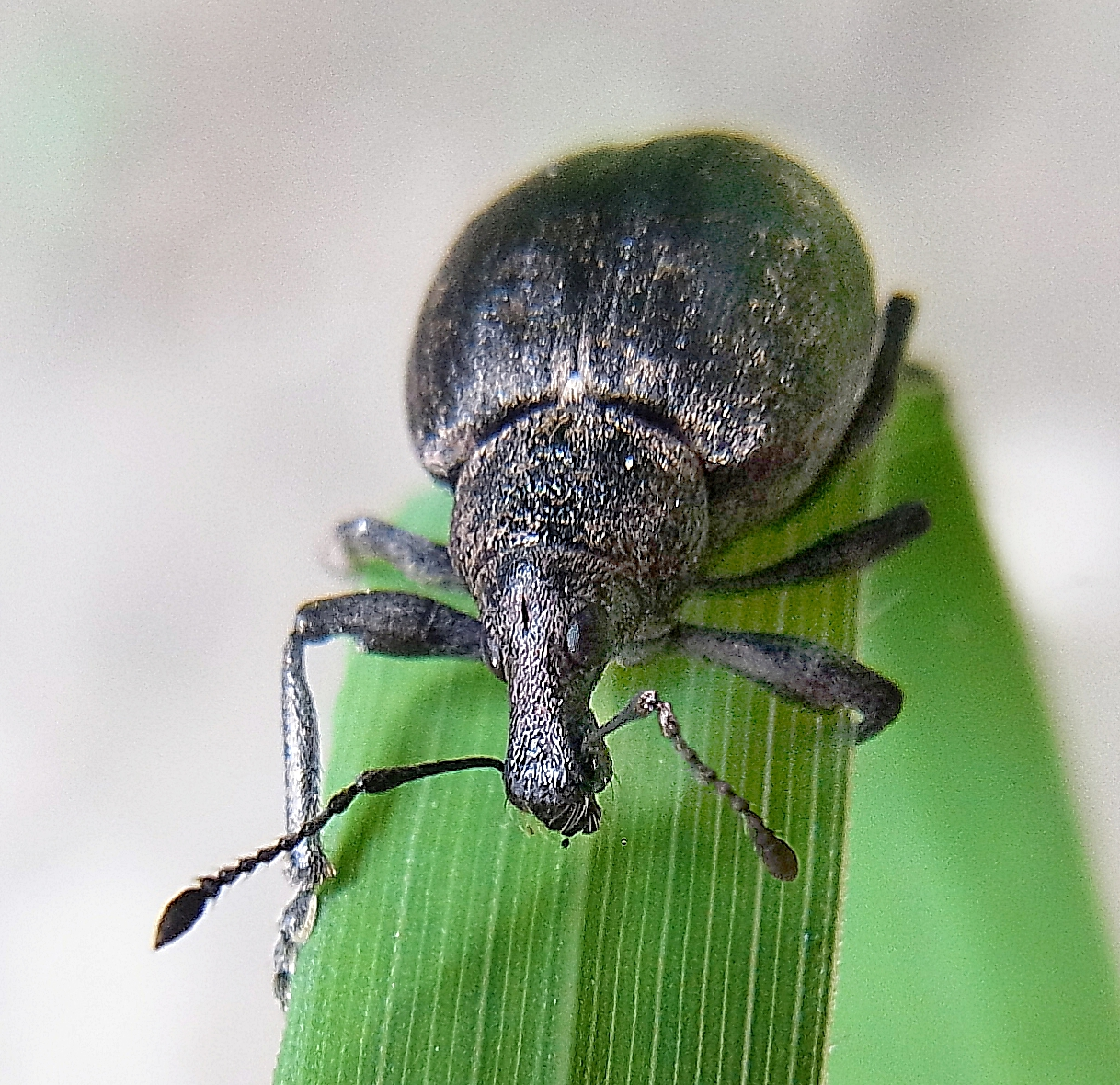
