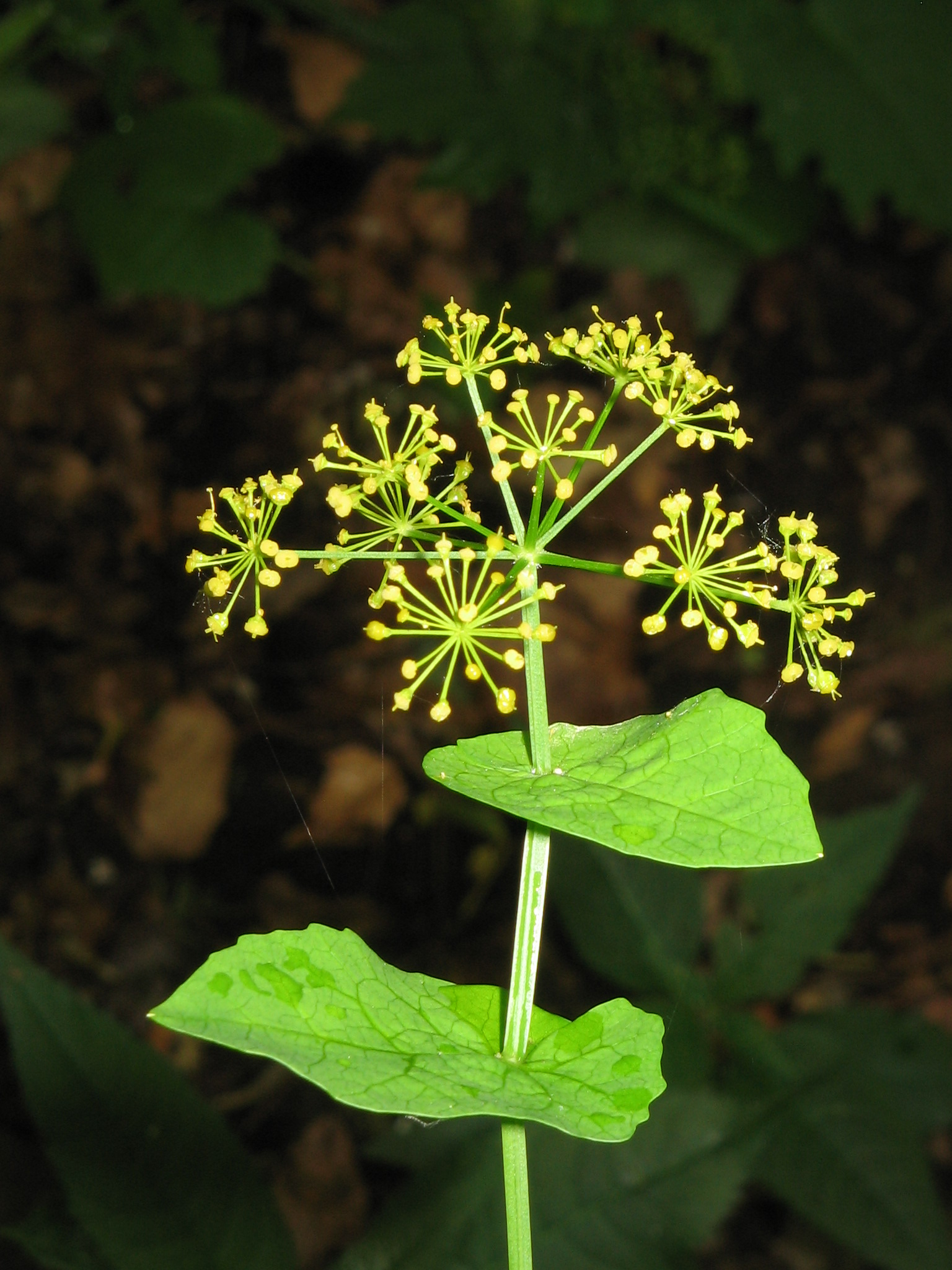
- Smyrnium perfoliatum

Scientific classification
- Kingdom: Plantae
- Clade: Tracheophytes
- Clade: Angiosperms
- Clade: Eudicots
- Clade: Asterids
- Order: Apiales
- Family: Apiaceae
- Subfamily: Apioideae
- Tribe: Smyrnieae
- Genus: Smyrnium; L.

Species
- See text

= Smyrnium =

Genus of flowering plants

Smyrnium is a genus of flowering plants in the family Apiaceae that naturally grows in a range stretching from Southern Europe to South Asia.

Species include:

- Smyrnium cordifolium
- Smyrnium dodonaei Spreng.
- Smyrnium creticum
- Smyrnium olusatrum - alexanders, black-lovage, horse-parsley
- Smyrnium perfoliatum - perfoliate alexanders
