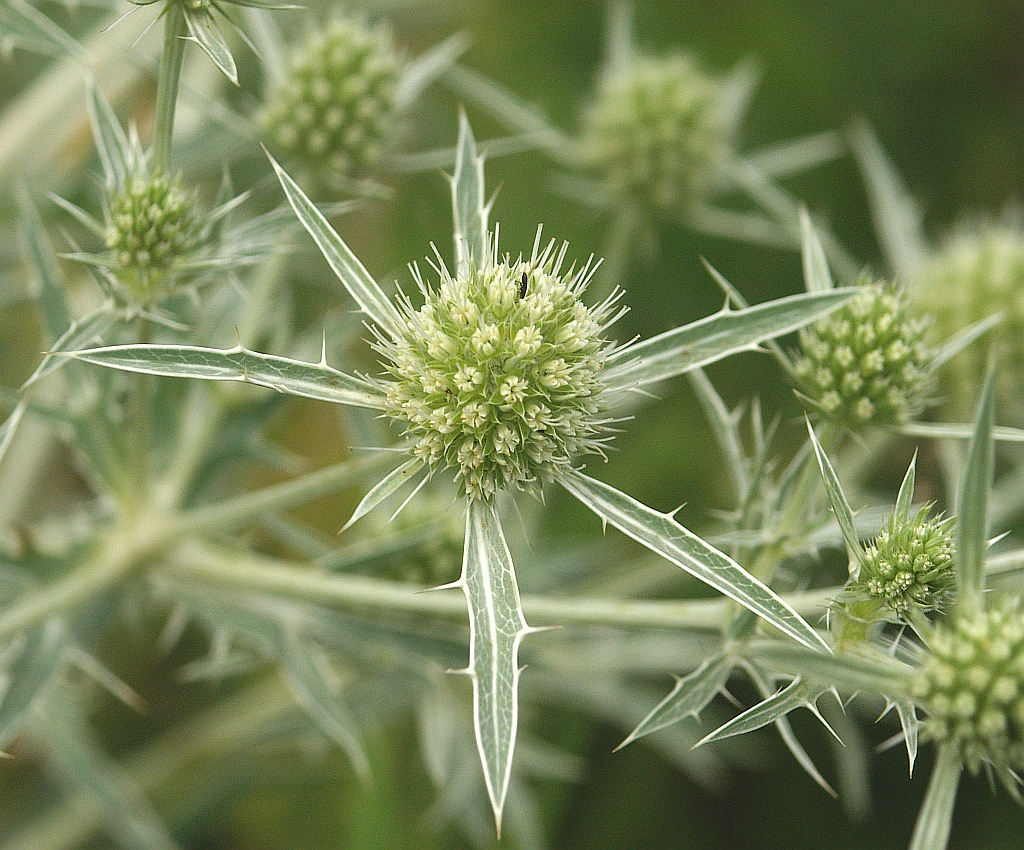
- E. campestre var. campestre

Scientific classification
- Kingdom: Plantae
- Clade: Tracheophytes
- Clade: Angiosperms
- Clade: Eudicots
- Clade: Asterids
- Order: Apiales
- Family: Apiaceae
- Genus: Eryngium
- Species: E. campestre

Binomial name
- Eryngium campestre L.

= Eryngium campestre =

Species of flowering plant in the celery family

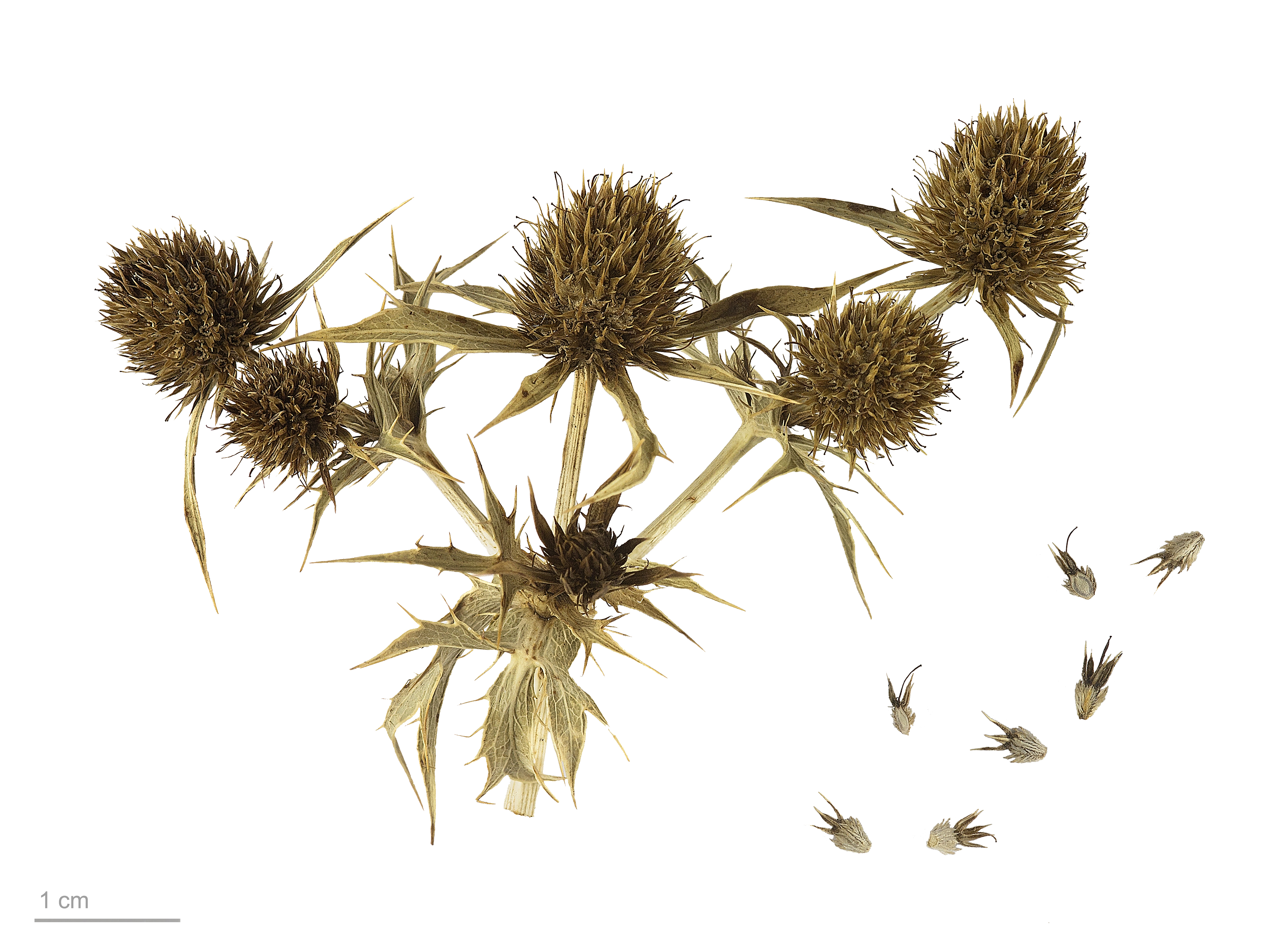
Eryngium campestre - MHNT

Eryngium campestre, known as field eryngo, or Watling Street thistle, is a species of Eryngium, which is also used medicinally. A member of the carrot family Apiaceae, it is a hairless, greenish perennial plant with tough spiny leaves.

== Description ==
Eryngium campestre is a stiff, greyish or greenish, hairless perennial, with complexly-divided prickly leaves, and a wide display of small greenish heads, each based with a whorl of 5-6 large spine-like bracts, and within a head each small flower is attended by a small simple spine. The basal leaves are long-stalked and pinnate.

It has two natural varieties -

var. campestre is blueish-greyish green with the bracts (whorled under the heads) being widest near their middle, and geographically is more northern, stretching north of the Mediterranean from Portugal to Germany on the west side through to Turkey into Central European Russia on the east, with presence on the south in North Africa just in Algeria and Morocco.

var. virens (Link) Weins is yellowier-greeny with the bracts (whorled under the heads) being widest near their base, more dry-tolerant (xerophytic), and geographically is more southern and eastern, stretching along the south of the Mediterranean from Morocco to Iran, with patchy distribution directly on the north side.

In Britain it resembles the better known sea holly (Eryngium maritimum), but is taller and looser, greener, and the whorls under the flower heads are not leaf-like, the heads being smaller, or some of the garden Eryngos, but green. This plant flowers between July and September.

== Distribution and habitat ==
It is common in many places of its range but in Germany it is restricted to dry habitats near the Rivers Rhine and Elbe. In the British Isles it is very uncommon in dry grassland on neutral or calcareous soils in the southeast, having first been recorded in 1662 by the naturalist John Ray in Devon. It has statutory protection in Somerset and Devon and is persisting in several sites there, but elsewhere it is mostly a short-lived casual of waste ground, road verges and rough pastures.

== Biology ==
The leaves of this plant are mined by the gall fly, Euleia heraclei.

== Uses ==
It is used in herbalism as an infusion to treat coughs, whooping cough and urinary infections. Roots were formerly candied as sweets or boiled and roasted as a vegetable. The plant's active constituents are essential oils, saponins, tannins.

In Iran's Mazandaran Province, it has been used in various local dishes for centuries.
