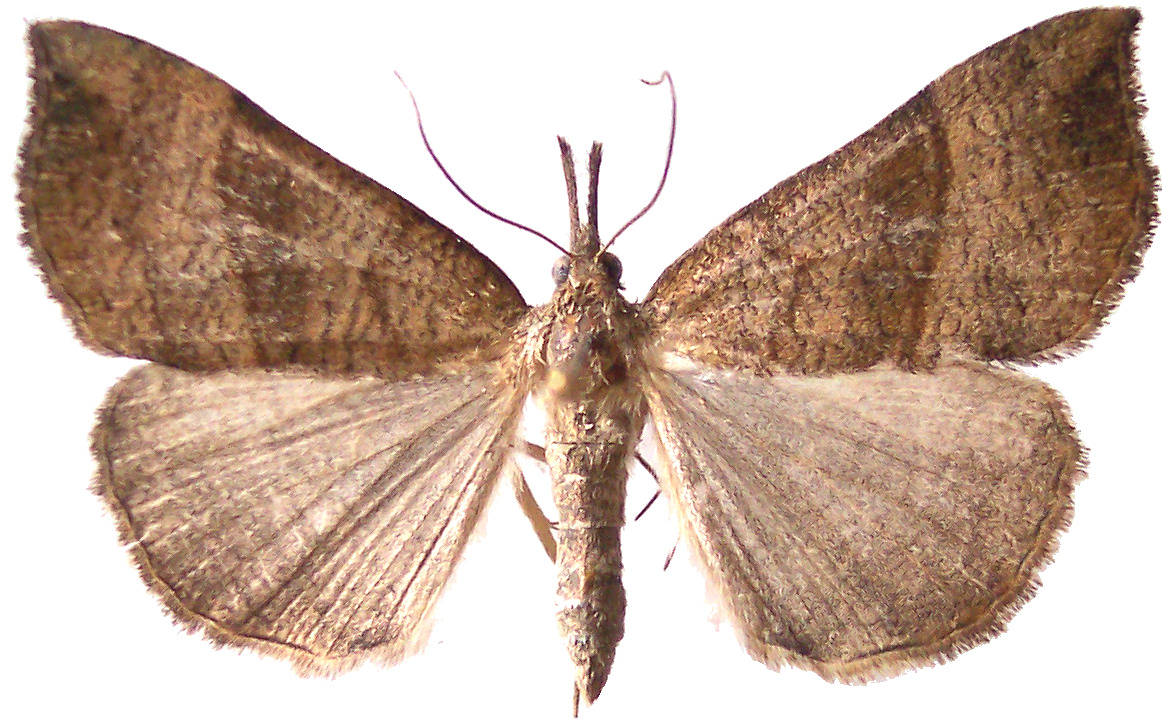
- H. proboscidalis from Eure-et-Loir, France
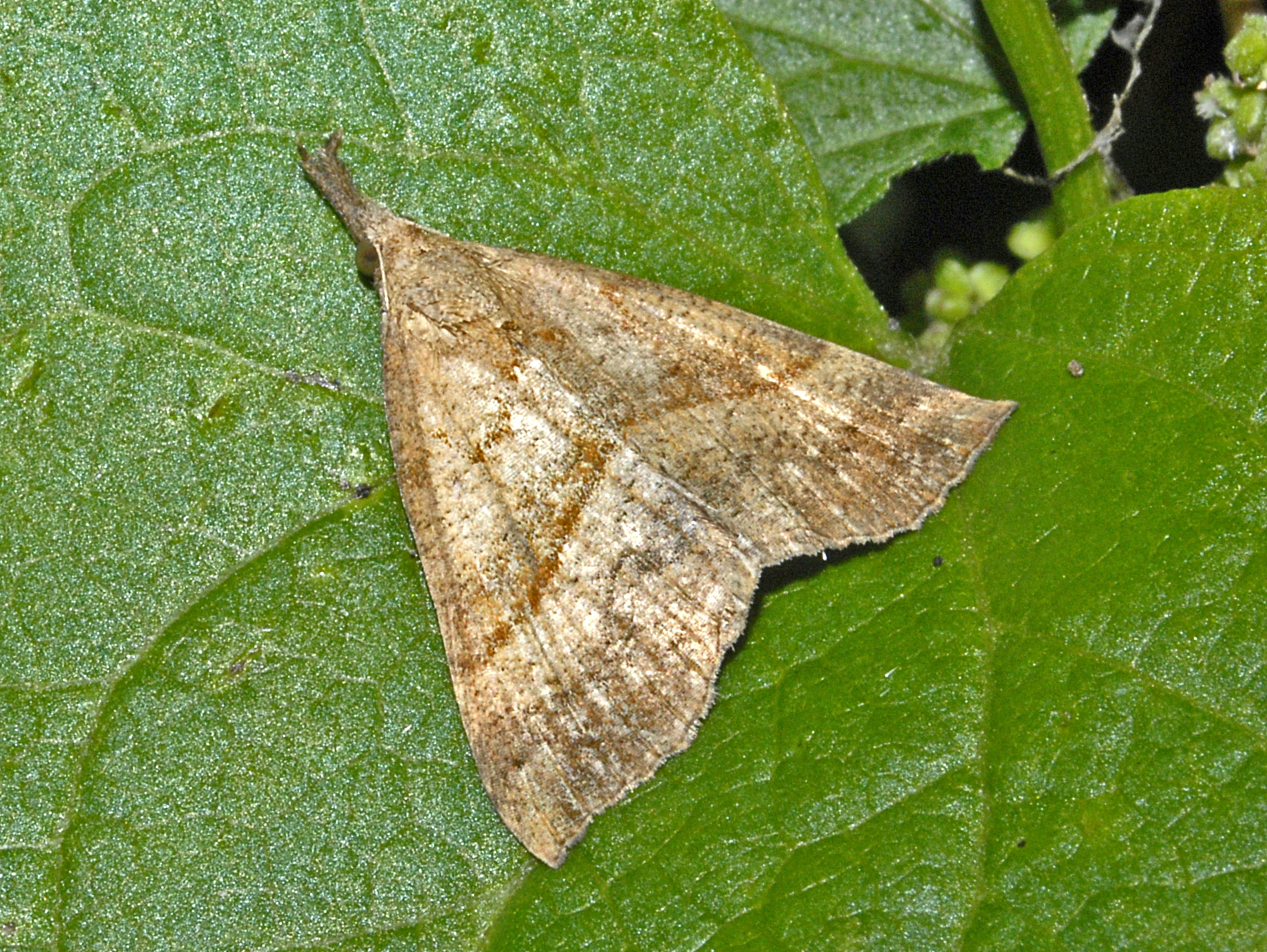

Scientific classification
- Kingdom: Animalia
- Phylum: Arthropoda
- Class: Insecta
- Order: Lepidoptera
- Superfamily: Noctuoidea
- Family: Erebidae
- Genus: Hypena
- Species: H. proboscidalis

Binomial name
- Hypena proboscidalis (Linnaeus, 1758)

Synonyms
- List: Crambus proboscidatus Haworth, 1809; Hypena aestiva Hannemann, 1916; Hypena bilineata Lempke, 1949; Hypena brunnea Tutt, 1892; Hypena brunneabilineata Lempke, 1949; Hypena cervinalis Moore, 1867; Hypena deleta Staudinger, 1892; Hypena ensalis Fabricius, 1794; Hypena flexilinea Warren, 1913; Hypena indicalis Guenée, 1854; Hypena infuscata Spuler, 1908; Hypena obsoleta Lempke, 1949; Hypena ochreipennis Moore, 1882; Hypena parva Hannemann, 1916; Hypena proboscidalis subsp. deleta Staudinger, 1892; Hypena proboscidalis subsp. flexilinea Warren, 1913; Hypena proboscidatus Haworth, 1809; Hypena proboscidens Fabricius, 1798; Hypena purpurascens Lempke, 1949; Hypena signata Spuler, 1908; Hypena tatorhina Butler, 1879; Phalaena ensalis Fabricius, 1794; Phalaena proboscidalis Linnaeus, 1758

= Hypena proboscidalis =

Species of moth

Hypena proboscidalis, the snout, is a moth of the family Erebidae. The species was first described by Carl Linnaeus in his 1758 10th edition of Systema Naturae.

== Distribution and habitat ==
This species is found in Europe in the north to the Arctic Circle. To the east it ranges across the Palearctic including North Africa, Siberia, Iran, the Altai Mountains, Kamchatka, Kashmir, India, China, Korea, Japan and Taiwan. In the Alps and India, it rises to elevations of over 1600 metres.

== Technical description and variation ==
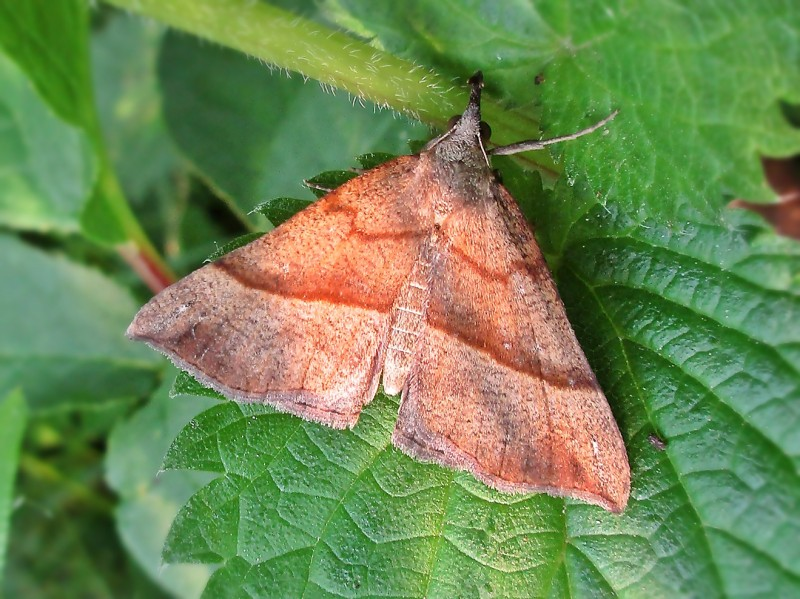

The wingspan is 25–38 mm. Its forewings are grey brown with numerous dark transverse striae, and with a brownish-yellow suffusion in the females; the lines dark brown; the inner curved or bent in middle; the outer oblique, nearly straight, slightly incurved at costa, internally shaded with dark brown; the subterminal cloudy and partially interrupted, above middle marked with black white-tipped dashes, followed by a brown cloud, the subapical edge of which is oblique; hindwing pale greyish.

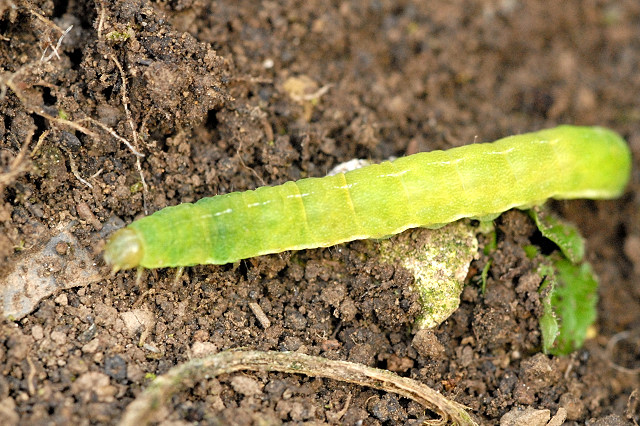

As a rule most females are brownish (per Warren in Seitz this was the source of the naming of ab. brunnea by Tutt), most males grey without the brown. The form deleta Stgr., from the Altai Mts., Amurland, and Kamschatka, is paler, the forewing yellowish, sprinkled with brown, with less distinct markings. Form tatorhina Btlr. [full species Hypena tatorhina Butler, 1879] from Japan, is small, grey in both sexes, with dingy fuscous suffusion, and a black spot in cell; the hindwing fuscous; - from W. China (Omei-shan and Tatsienlu) comes a form. — subsp. flexilinea subsp. nov. [Warren] dark grey brown in the female, with the transverse striae and the shades preceding the lines dark smoky fuscous, the outer line visibly bent above middle; in the males the dark shading is slight: --a similar but smaller form - indicalis Guen., occurs in the Goorais Valley. Kashmir, where the outer line has a tendency to be elbowed on both folds, and the male, which is quite without dark shading, has a small black dot in cell and a large black spot at its end.

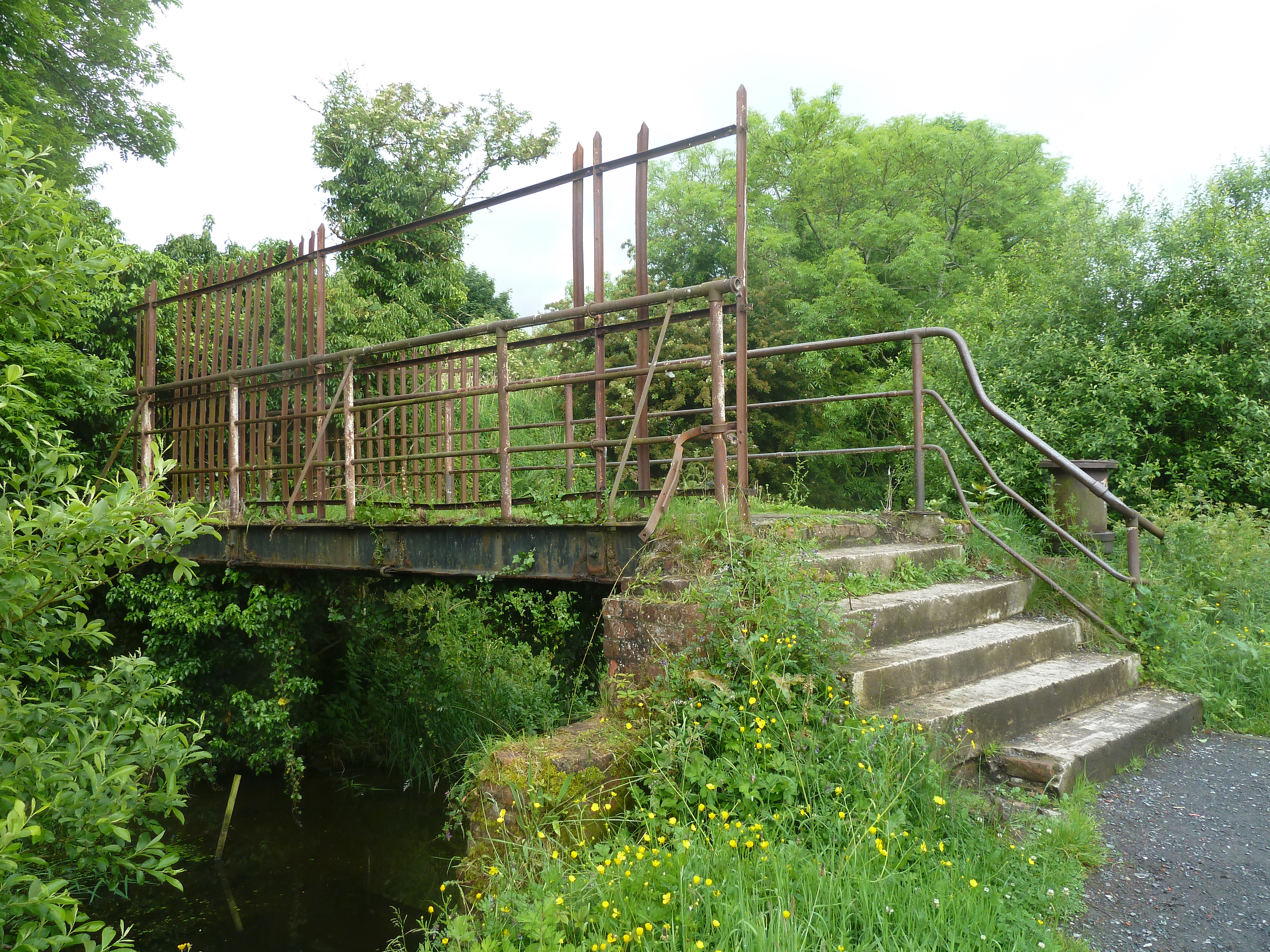
Habitat in Ireland

== Biology ==
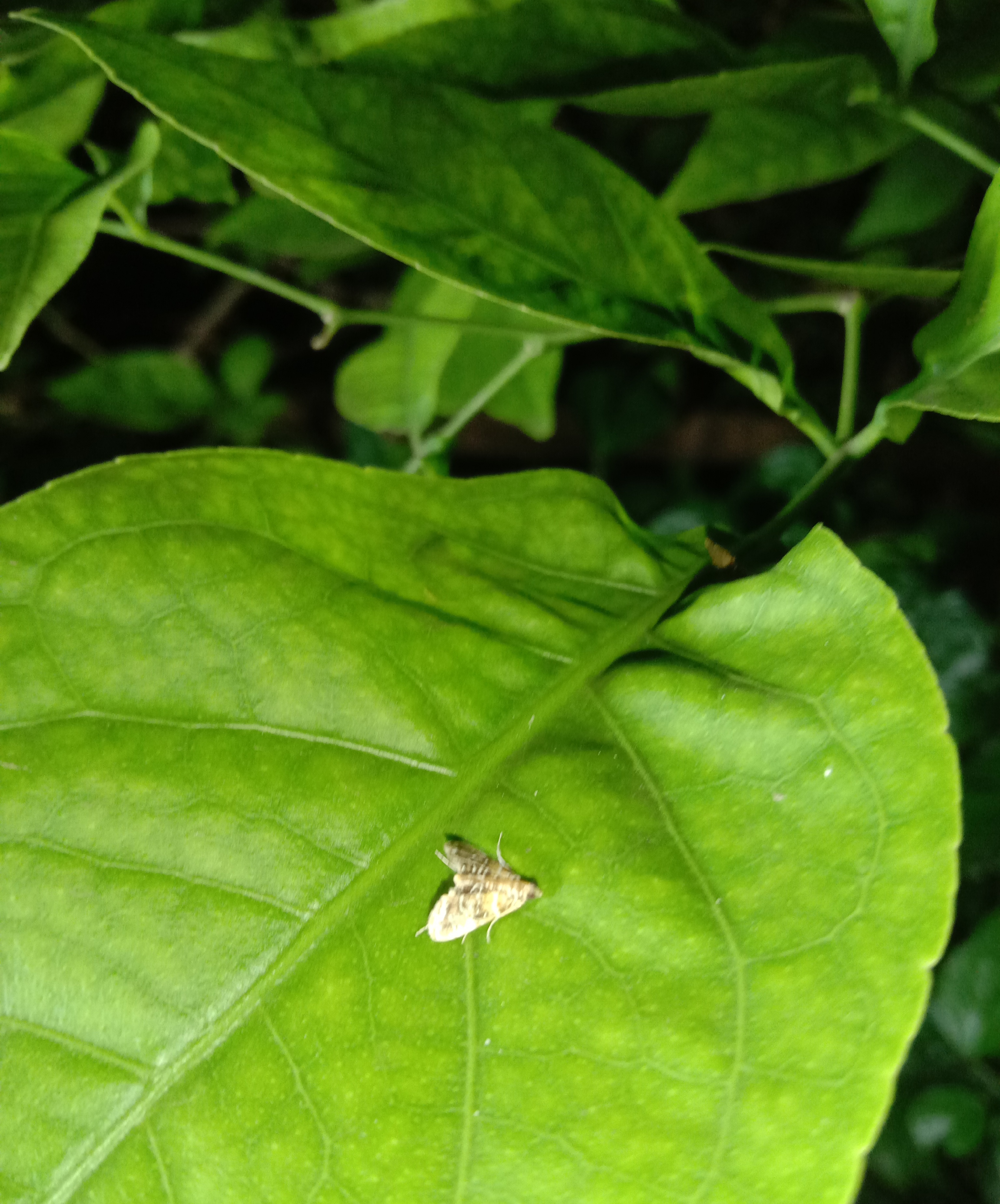
Hypena proboscidalis on an Indian bael leaf at night, in May 2022.

The moth flies in two generations from May to September.

Larvae are velvety green with the dorsal line darker green; the subdorsal lines paler; head, legs, and tubercles green. The larvae feed on hop (Humulus species), nettle (Urtica species), ground-elder (Aegopodium sp.) and Stachys species.

Habitats include deciduous, mixed and coniferous forests, rivers, hedges and gardens and parkland.

== Notes ==
1. The flight season refers to Belgium and the Netherlands. This may vary in other parts of the range.
