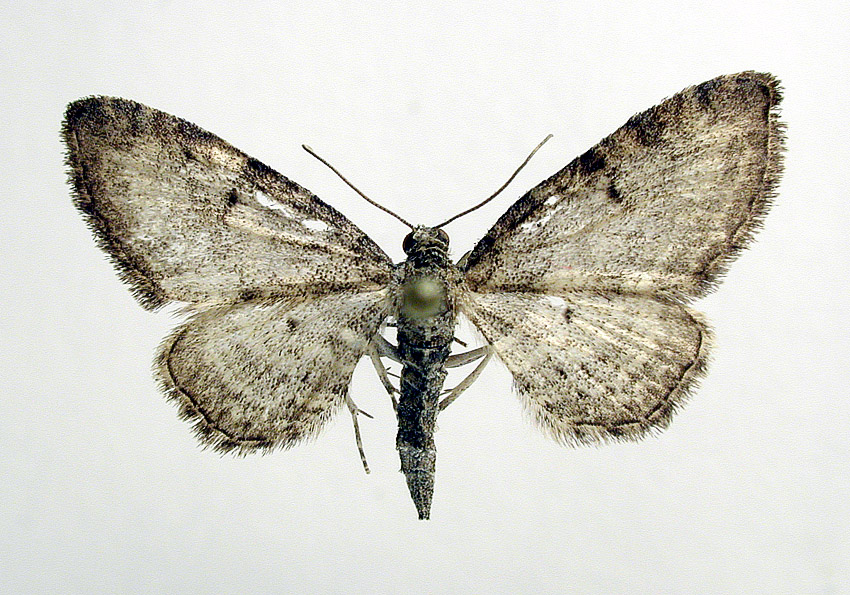

Scientific classification
- Domain: Eukaryota
- Kingdom: Animalia
- Phylum: Arthropoda
- Class: Insecta
- Order: Lepidoptera
- Family: Geometridae
- Genus: Eupithecia
- Species: E. subfuscata

Binomial name
- Eupithecia subfuscata (Haworth, 1809)

Synonyms
- List: Eupithecia blancheata Cooke, 1881; Eupithecia castigaria Boisduval, 1840; Geometra castigata Hubner, 1813; Eupithecia castigata; Eupithecia compressata Guenée, 1858; Eupithecia implicata Walker, 1862; Tephroclystia latipennis Hulst, 1898; Eupithecia latipennis; Eupithecia ichinosawana Matsumura, 1925; Eupithecia latimarginata Matsumura, 1925

= Grey pug =

Species of moth

The grey pug (Eupithecia subfuscata) is a moth of the family Geometridae. It is found throughout the Palearctic region. It is also found in North America. Since it does not place any special demands on climatic conditions, special caterpillar food plants, geological subsoil or the like it is a typical species of almost any Hochstaudenflur (plant corridor), where it occurs in the herb layer, in bushes and even on deciduous trees. It can be found on forest edges and hedgerows, on heath, in rocky places and wetlands, parks and gardens, as well as in villages and town centres.

== Subspecies ==
There are two subspecies:

- Eupithecia subfuscata subfuscata
- Eupithecia subfuscata ussuriensis Dietze 1910 (Russian Far East, Japan)

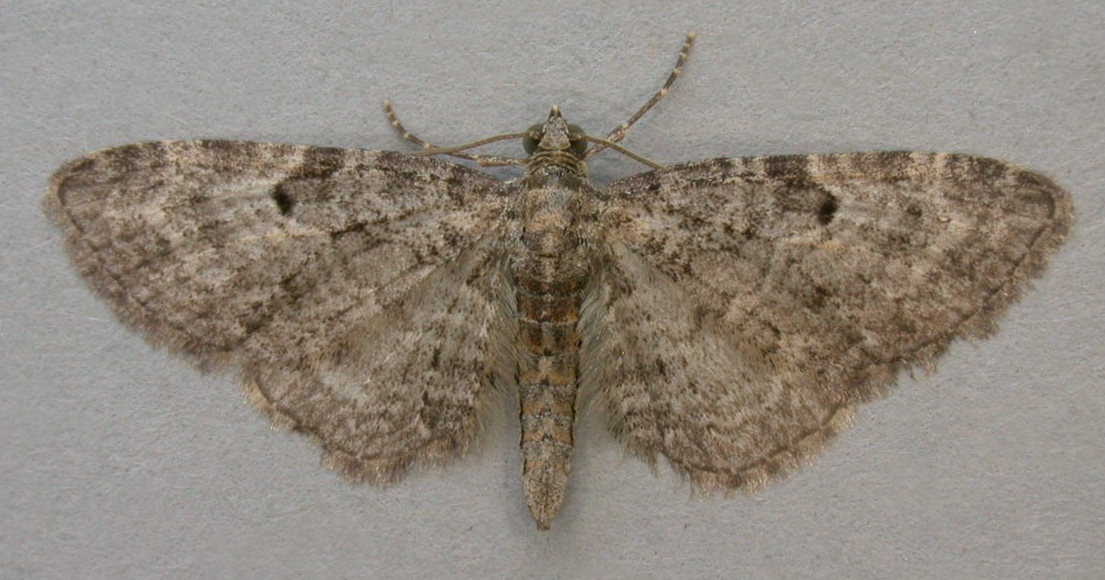
Eupithecia subfuscata Bury Ditches, England, May 2014

== Description ==
The forewings of this species are grey (occasionally with an ochreous tinge) marked with pale fascia and radial lines which give it a mottled appearance. There is a pale sub-marginal line and a small discal spot. The hindwings are much paler and plainer also with a small black discal spot. Melanism is quite common in this species. The wingspan is 17–21 mm. See also Prout

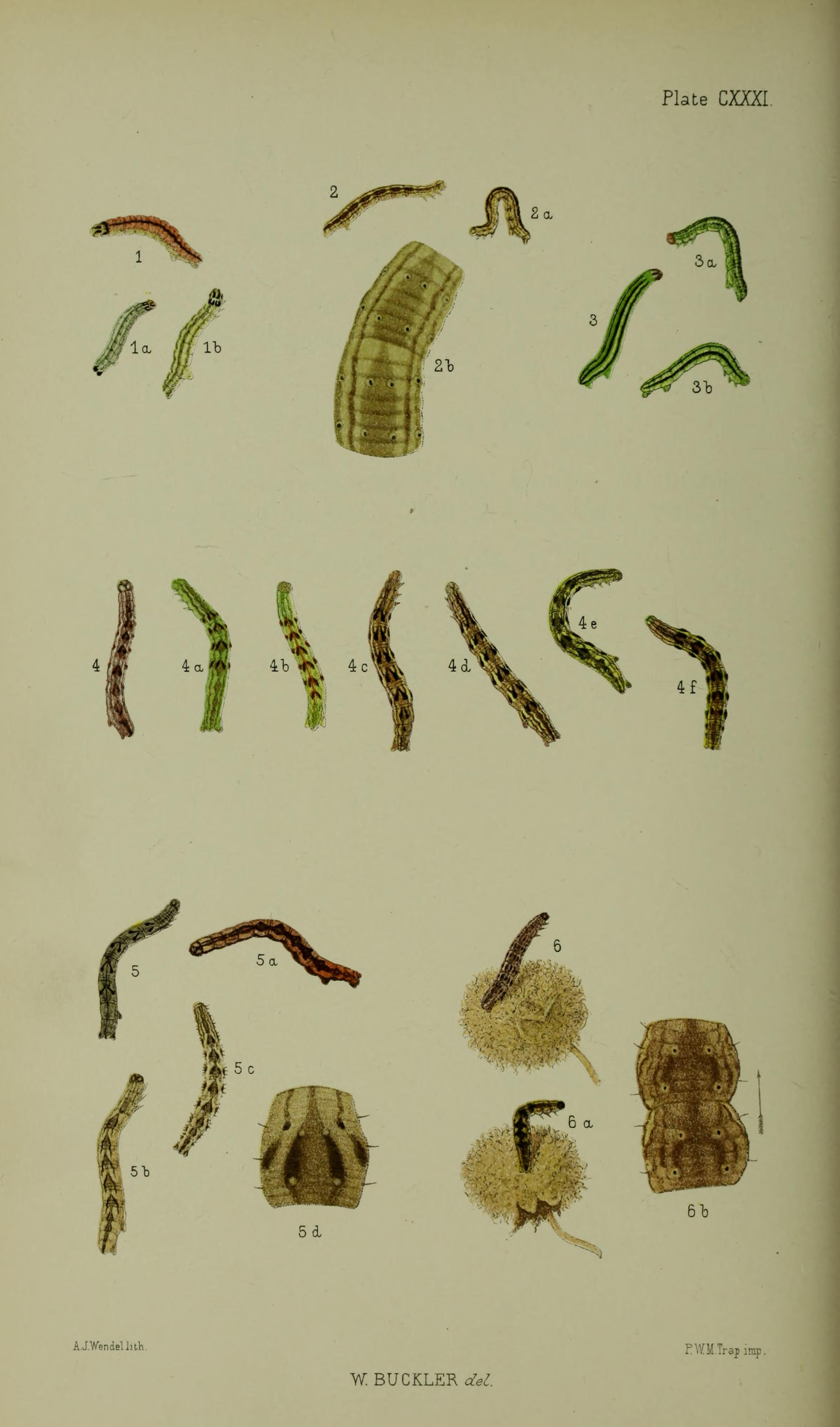
Larvae after final moult & enlarged detail of segments

Final instar larvae are smooth and elongated. They are grey-green or red-brown coloured and show a grey-green to dark olive-green diamond-like pattern on the back. The side edges are whitish.The pupa is yellow-brown with greenish wing sheaths. At the cremaster there are six hook bristles, the middle pair of which is more powerfully formed.

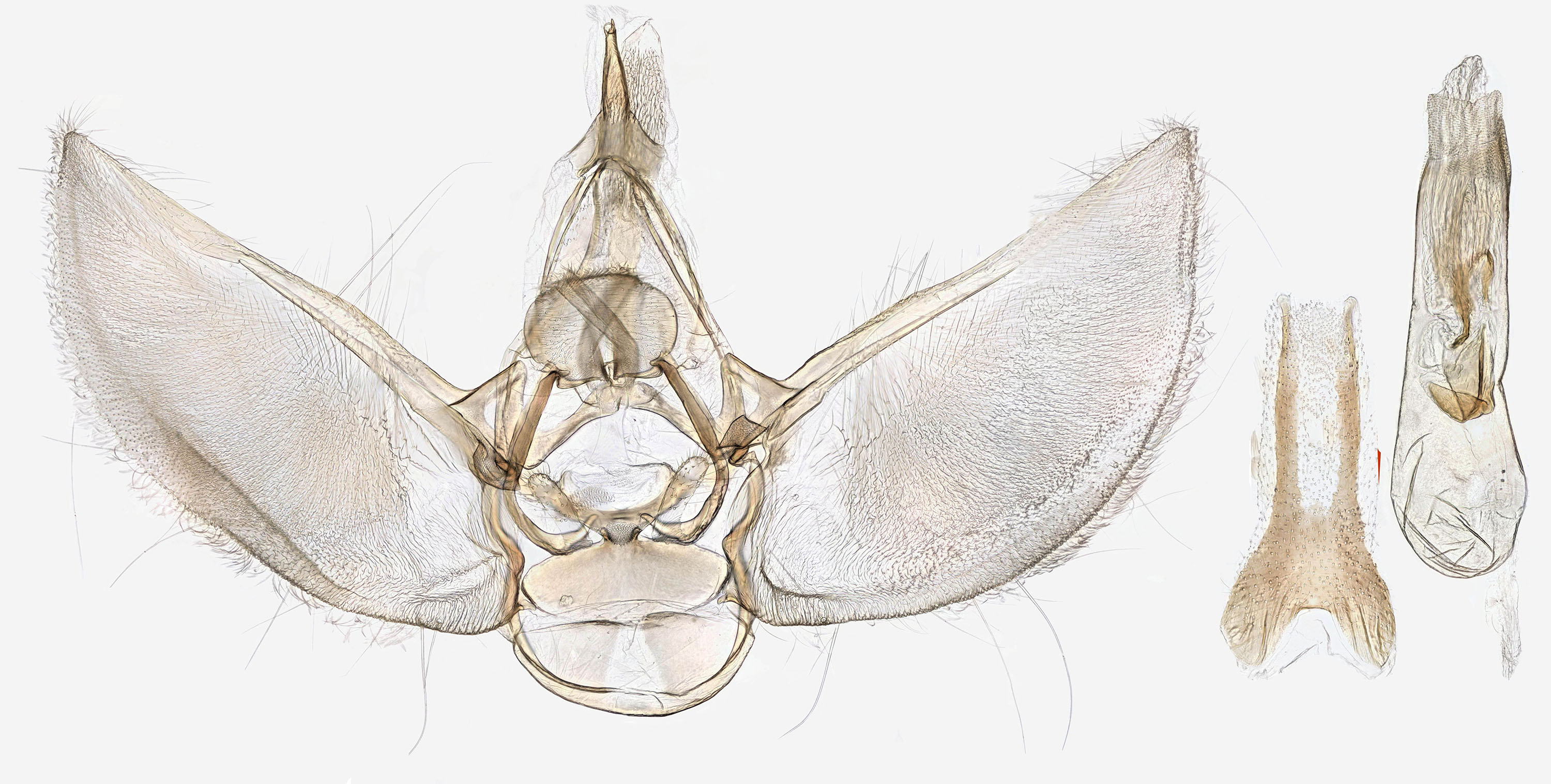
Male genitalia

== Similar species ==
- Eupithecia virgaureata
- Eupithecia lariciata

A safe determination is usually only possible by means of a genital morphological examination.

== Biology ==
The adults fly in May and June with a second brood sometimes emerging in August. The species flies at night and is attracted to light.

The species overwinters as a pupa.

=== Larval food plants ===
The larva feeds on the leaves and flowers of a wide range of plants.

- Abies – fir
- Achillea
- Aegopodium – ground-elder
- Alnus – alder
- Angelica
- Artemisia
- Betula – birch
- Centaurea
- Cirsium – creeping thistle
- Comptonia – sweetfern
- Epilobium – willowherb
- Filipendula – meadowsweet
- Galium – bedstraw
- Hypericum – St John's wort
- Larix – larch
- Lysimachia – yellow loosestrife
- Malus – apple
- Ononis – restharrow
- Picea – black spruce
- Populus – poplar
- Rubus – raspberry
- Salix – willow
- Scabiosa
- Solidago – goldenrod
- Tanacetum – tansy
- Urtica – nettle
- Valeriana – valerian
