= Eupithecia infecta =

Scientific classification
- Kingdom: Animalia
- Phylum: Arthropoda
- Clade: Pancrustacea
- Class: Insecta
- Order: Lepidoptera
- Family: Geometridae
- Genus: Eupithecia
- Species: E. infecta

Binomial name
- Eupithecia infecta Vojnits, 1981

Species of moth

Eupithecia infecta is a moth in the family Geometridae. It is found in China (Shensi).

In 2013, Vladimir Mironov and Anthony Galsworthy classified it as a junior synonym of E. laricarata.
