= Eupithecia mesodeicta =

Scientific classification
- Kingdom: Animalia
- Phylum: Arthropoda
- Clade: Pancrustacea
- Class: Insecta
- Order: Lepidoptera
- Family: Geometridae
- Genus: Eupithecia
- Species: E. mesodeicta

Binomial name
- Eupithecia mesodeicta Prout, 1938

Synonyms
- Eupithecia lariciata mesodeicta Prout, 1938; Eupithecia aspectabilis Inoue, 1996

Species of moth

Eupithecia mesodeicta is a moth in the family Geometridae. It was originally described as a subspecies of Eupithecia lariciata. It is found in Pakistan and northern India.
