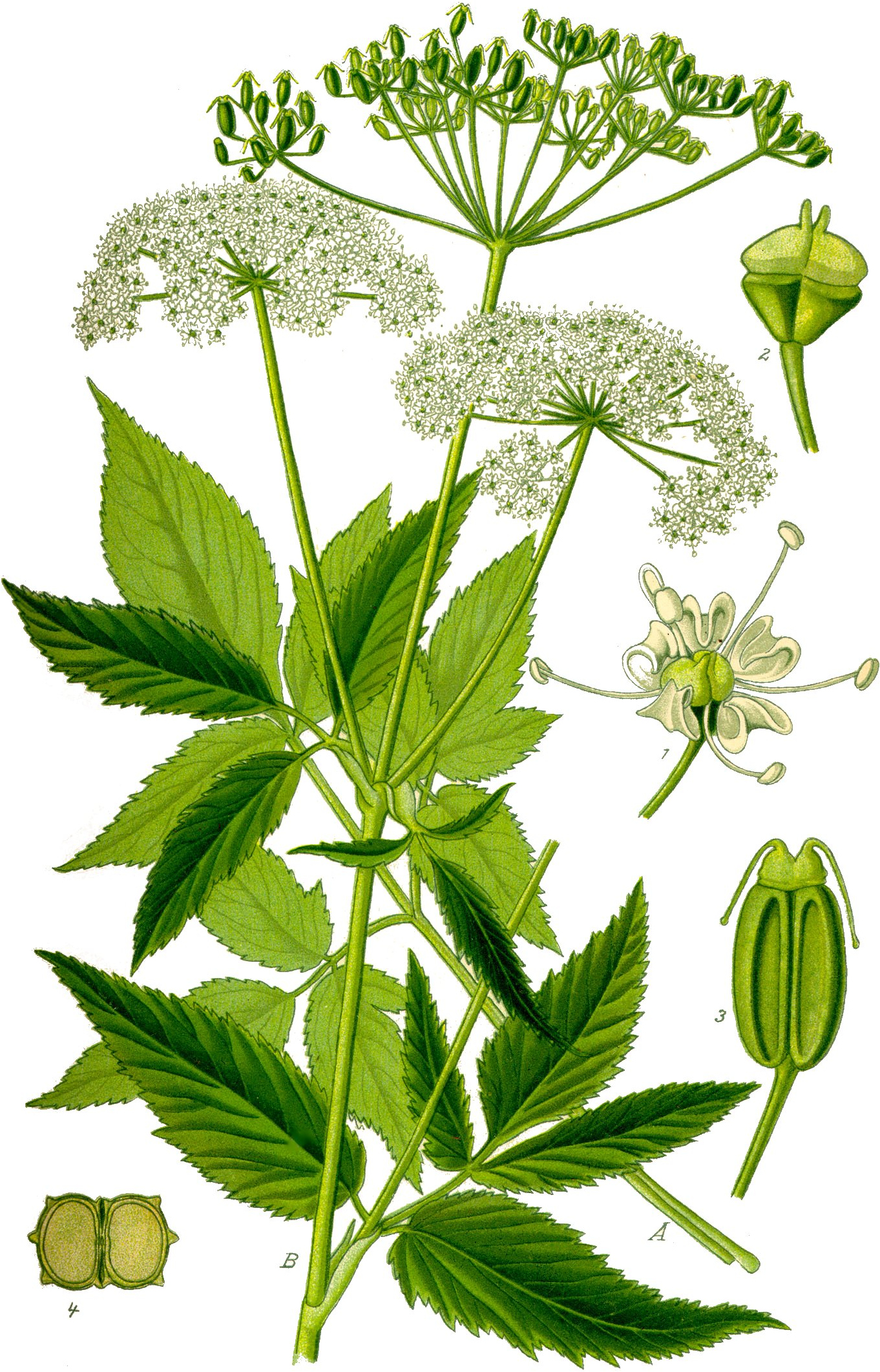
- Illustration from Otto Wilhelm Thomé's Flora von Deutschland, Österreich und der Schweiz (1885)

Scientific classification
- Kingdom: Plantae
- Clade: Embryophytes
- Clade: Tracheophytes
- Clade: Spermatophytes
- Clade: Angiosperms
- Clade: Eudicots
- Clade: Asterids
- Order: Apiales
- Family: Apiaceae
- Genus: Aegopodium
- Species: A. podagraria

Binomial name
- Aegopodium podagraria L.

Synonyms
- Aegopodium angelicifolium Salisb.; Aegopodium simplex Lavy; Aegopodium ternatum Gilib. nom. inval.; Aegopodium tribracteolatum Schmalh.; Apium biternatum Stokes; Apium podagraria (L.) Caruel; Carum podagraria (L.) Roth

= Aegopodium podagraria =

Species of flowering plant in the celery family

Aegopodium podagraria, commonly called ground elder, is a species of flowering plant in the carrot family Apiaceae that grows in shady places. The name "ground elder" comes from the superficial similarity of its leaves and flowers to those of elder (Sambucus), which is not closely related. Other common names include herb gerard, bishop's weed, jack jumpabout, goutweed, gout wort, snow-in-the-mountain, English masterwort and wild masterwort. It is the type species of the genus Aegopodium. It is native to Europe and Asia, but has been introduced around the world as an ornamental plant, where it occasionally poses an ecological threat as an invasive exotic plant.

== Description ==
This herbaceous perennial grows to a height of 1 metre (3 1/2 ft) from underground rhizomes. The stems are erect, hollow, and grooved. The upper leaves are ternate, broad and toothed. It flowers in spring and early summer. Numerous flowers are grouped together in an umbrella-shaped flowerhead known as a compound umbel. This is divided into several individual umbels (known as umbellets). Each umbellet has 15 to 20 rays (pedicels) that are each topped with a single, small, five-petaled white flower. These are visited by many types of pollinating insects.

The fruits, produced in late summer and autumn, are small and have long curved styles.

== Distribution and habitat ==
Aegopodium podagraria is distributed widely in the temperate zone of western Asia and the whole of mainland Europe. It has been introduced elsewhere, including Ireland, the United Kingdom, the United States, Canada, Australia (including Tasmania), New Zealand, and Japan.

== Ecology ==
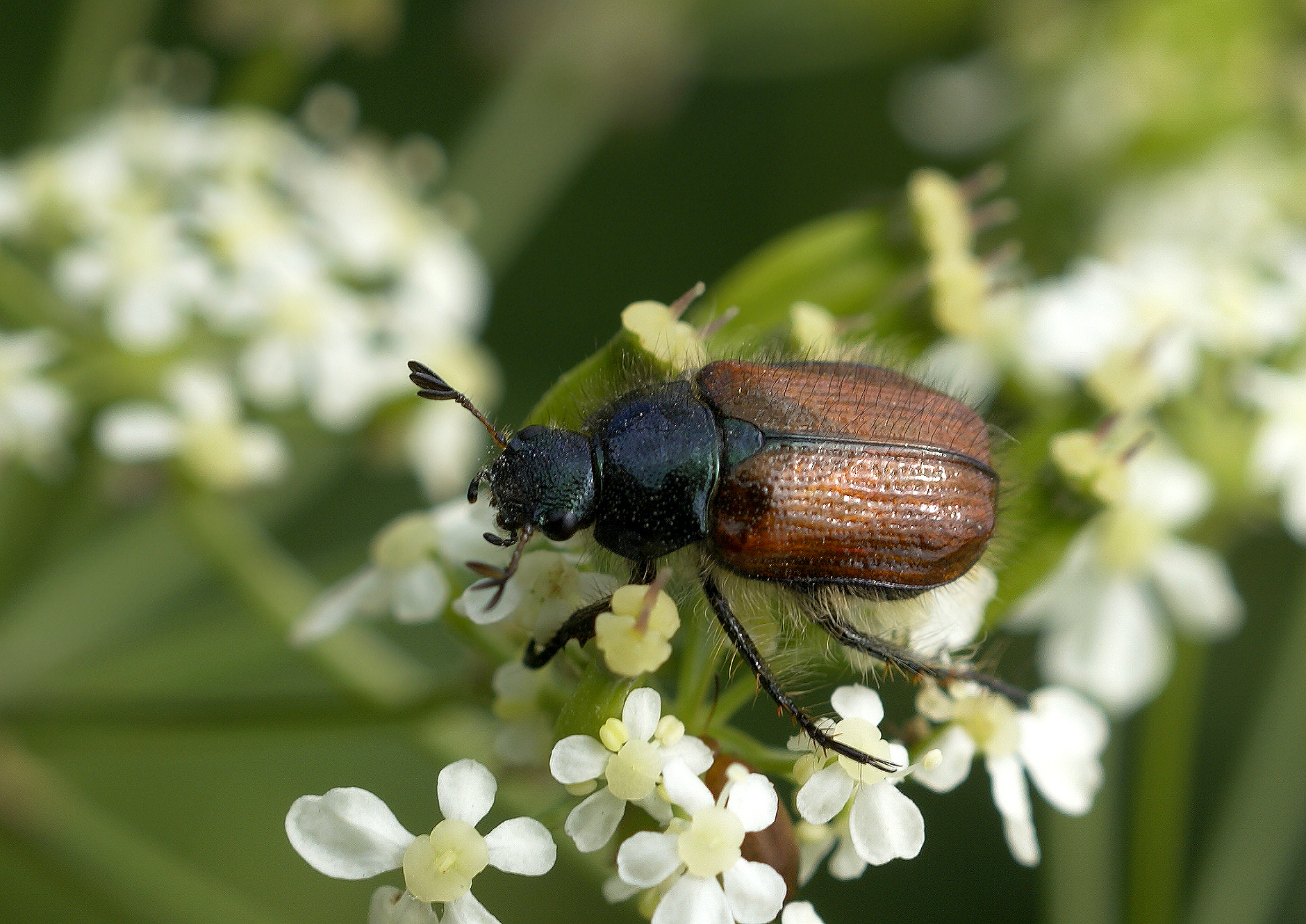
Phyllopertha horticola beetle on goutweed flowers

In Eurasia, it is used as a food plant by the larvae of some species of Lepidoptera, including dot moth, grey dagger and grey pug, although A. podagraria is not the exclusive host to any of these species.

=== Invasiveness ===
Seed dispersal and seedling establishment are typically limited by shading, and new establishments from seed are restricted to disturbed areas. However A. podagraria readily spreads over large areas of ground by underground rhizomes. Once established, the plants are highly competitive, even in shaded environments, and can reduce the diversity of ground cover and prevent the establishment of tree and shrub seedlings. Because of its limited seed dispersal ability, short-lived seed bank and seedling recruitment, the primary vector for dispersal to new areas is human plantings as an ornamental, medicinal or vegetable plant, as well as by accidentally spreading rhizomes by dumping of garden waste. It spreads rapidly under favorable growing conditions. Because of this it has been described as a nuisance species, and been labelled one of the "worst" garden weeds in perennial flower gardens.

==== Status as an invasive exotic plant ====
Aegopodium podagraria has been introduced around the world, including in North America, Australia, New Zealand and Japan, most commonly as an ornamental plant. It readily establishes and can become naturalized in boreal, moist-temperate and moist-subtropical climates. It is an aggressive invader in the upper Great Lakes region and northeastern North America, Australia, Tasmania and New Zealand. It can pose an ecological threat owing to its invasive nature, with potential to crowd out native species. Because of its potential impacts on native communities and the difficulty of controlling it, it has been banned or restricted in some jurisdictions outside its native range, including in Connecticut, Massachusetts, Wisconsin and Vermont in the U.S.

==== Control ====
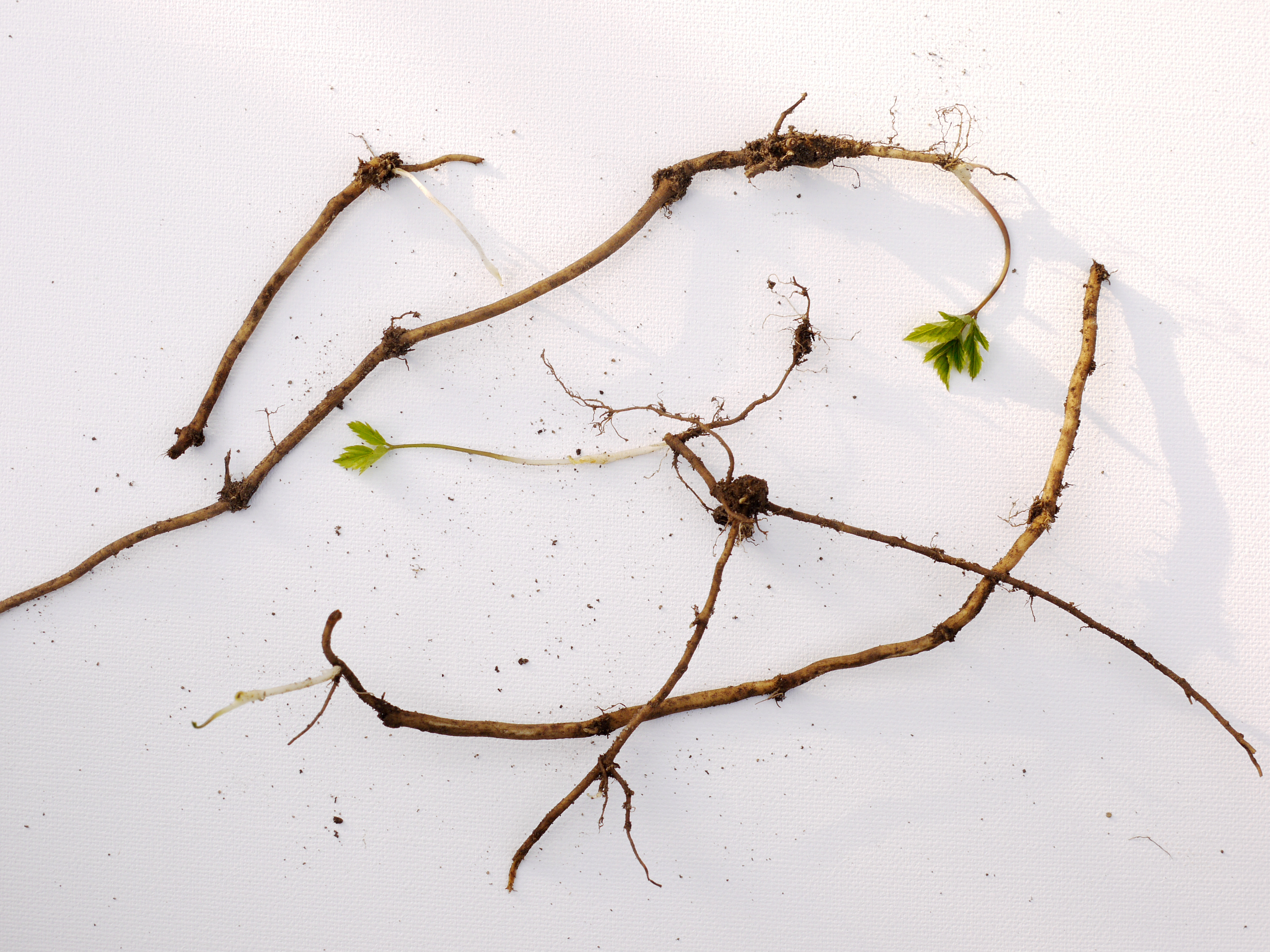
Rhizomes developing new shoots

Once established, goutweed is difficult to eradicate. The smallest piece of rhizome left in the ground will quickly form a sturdy new plant. All-green goutweed may be more persistent and spread more rapidly than ornamental, variegated goutweed varieties, making the all-green type particularly difficult to control. And all-green, wild type forms are known to reappear from seeds of variegated varieties.

Integrative management strategies that combine herbicide with landscape cloth, bark mulch, and hand weeding to control goutweed in a garden are largely unsuccessful because sprouting occurs from either rhizomes or root fragments left in the soil. Hand pulling, raking, and digging followed by monitoring to control goutweed may be effective; however, caution must be taken to remove the entire rhizome and root system. Removing flowers before seed set may help control the spread of goutweed. Because goutweed's starch reserves are typically depleted by spring, removal of leaves in spring could be effective in starving the plant. Once goutweed has been removed, the patch should be carefully monitored periodically for a few years. New shoots should be dug up and destroyed. Revegetation with other plant materials is recommended.

Systemic herbicides such as glyphosate are recommended because A. podagraria will regrow if merely defoliated.

The most effective means of control is to prevent its establishment in natural communities. It is thus recommended to plant goutweed only on sites not adjacent to wildlands and in gardens where root spread can be restricted (e.g., between a sidewalk and a house). However, the aggressive nature of this plant makes even this strategy risky. Several states have banned sales of goutweed (also known as bishop's weed).

== Uses ==
The tender leaves can be utilized as a spring leaf vegetable akin to spinach, having been used thus since antiquity. It is commonly used for soup. Young leaves are preferred as a pot herb. It is best picked from when it appears (as early as February in the UK and other parts of northern Europe) to just before it flowers (May to June). If it is picked after this point it tastes pungent and has a laxative effect. However, it can be stopped from flowering by pinching out the flowers, ensuring the plant remains edible if used more sparingly as a pot herb.

It has been used as a medicinal herb to treat gout and arthritis.

The plant is said to have been introduced into Great Britain by the Romans as a food plant and into Northern Europe as a medicinal herb by monks. It is still found growing in patches surrounding many monastic ruins in Europe, and descriptions of its use are found among monastic writings, such as in Physica by Hildegard von Bingen.

As a member of Apiaceae, its flowers may be confused with extremely toxic species such as poison hemlock and hemlock water dropwort; attention to the leaves is required for a conclusive identification.

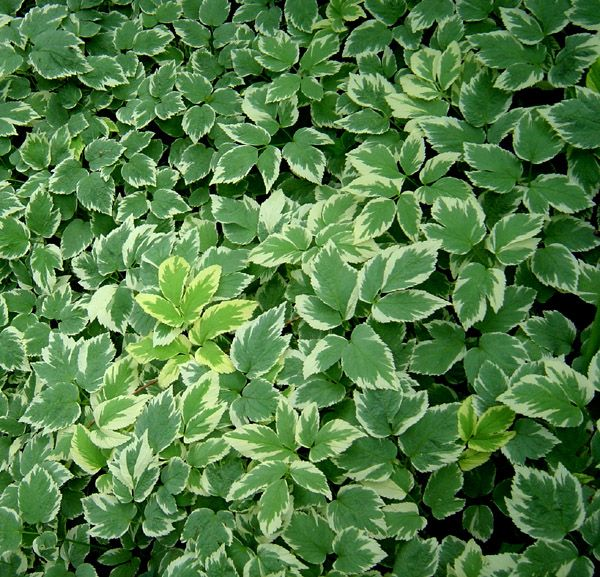
An ornamental form with variegated leaves

A variegated form is grown as an ornamental plant. However it is banned in several states owing to its invasiveness. Seeds from the variegated form may revert to the more aggressive green form.

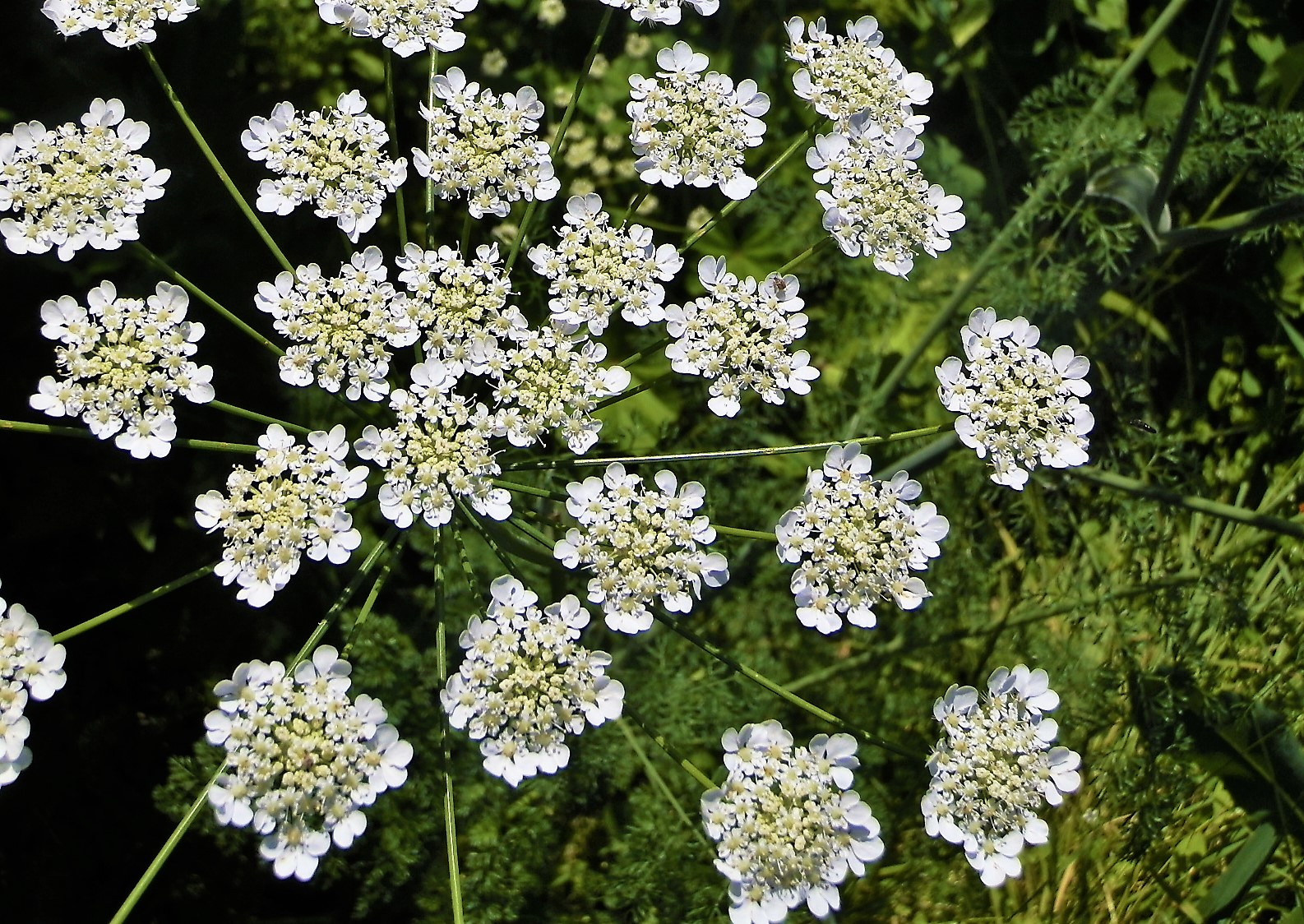
Ground elder

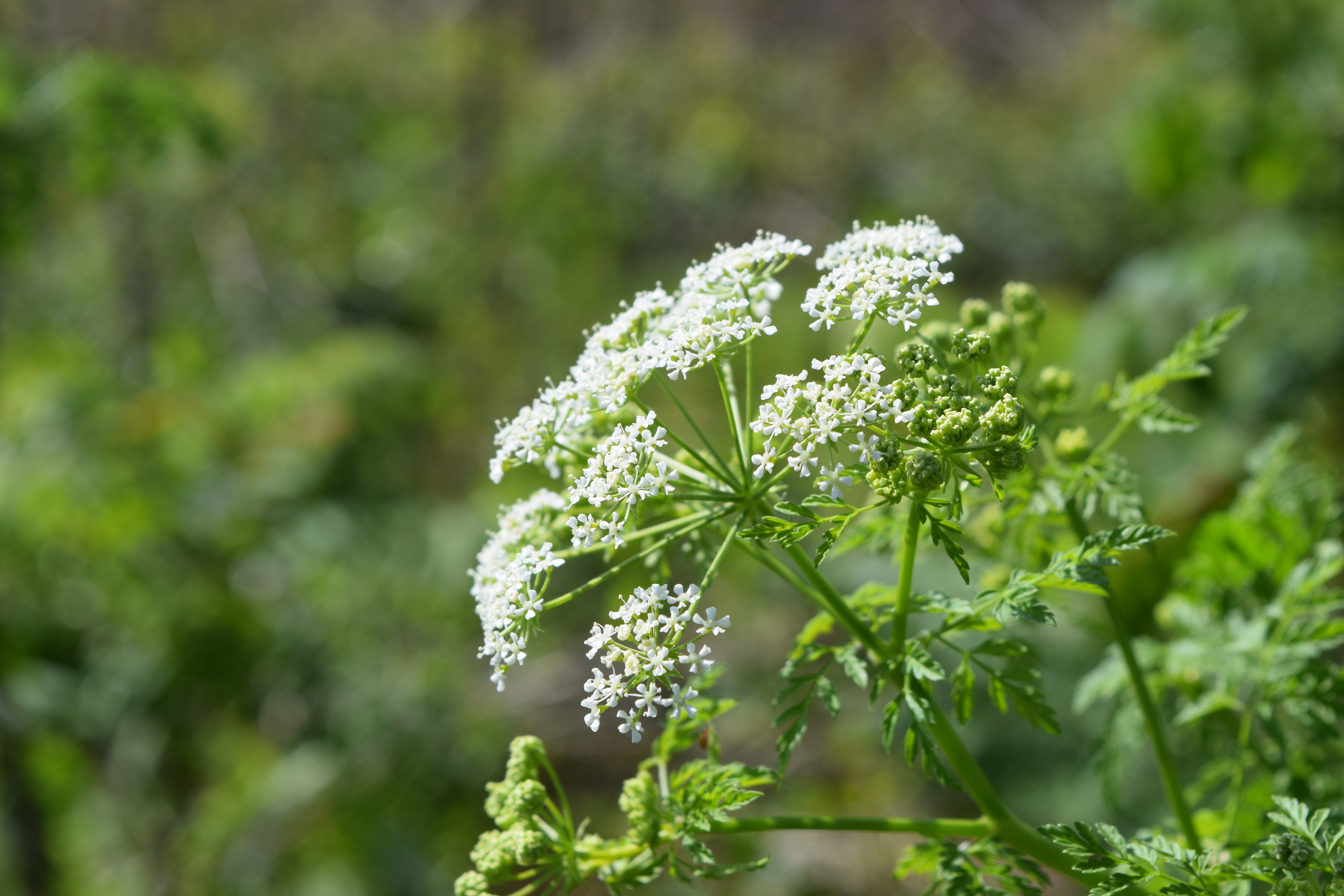
Hemlock

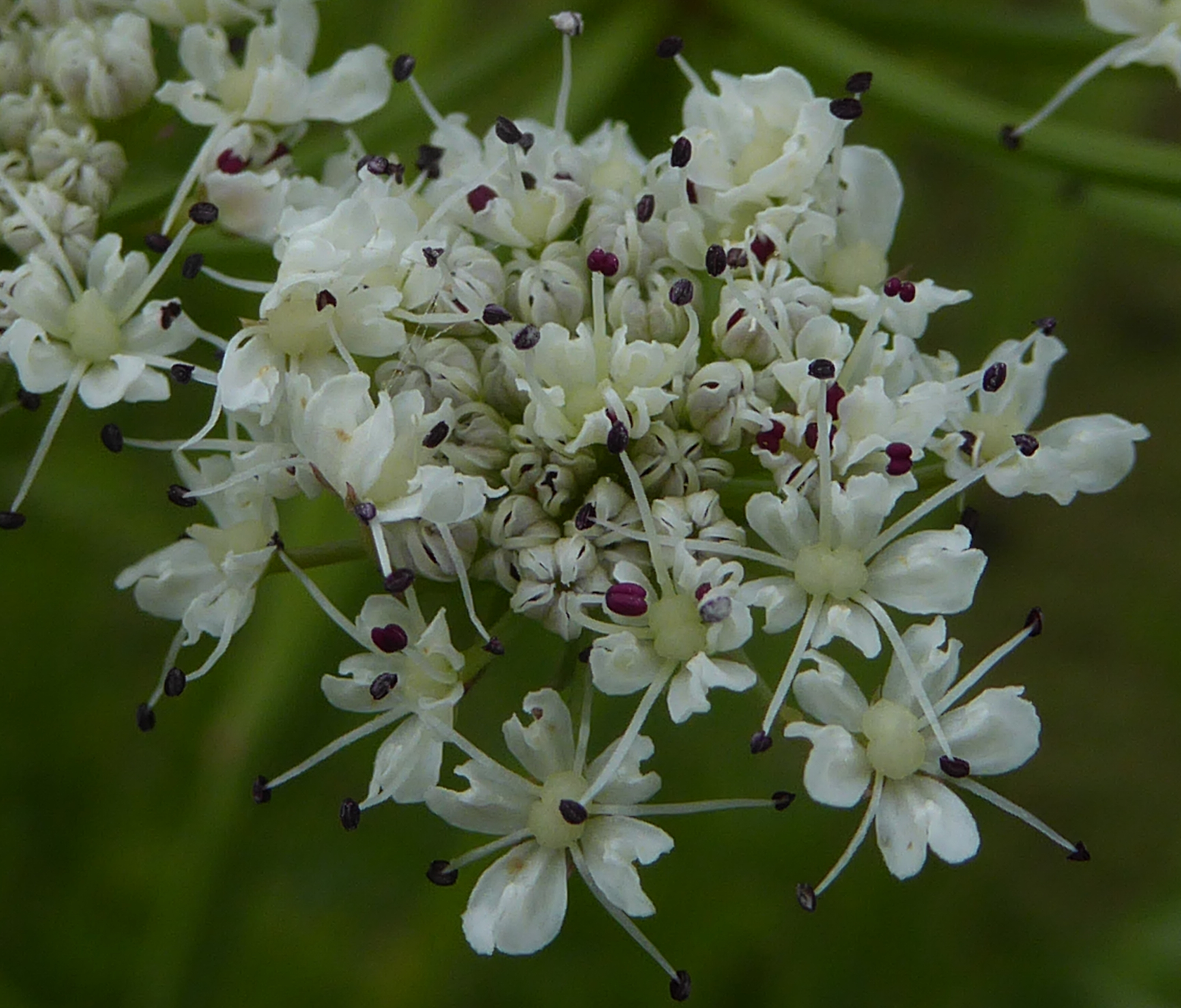
Hemlock water-dropwort

== Gallery ==
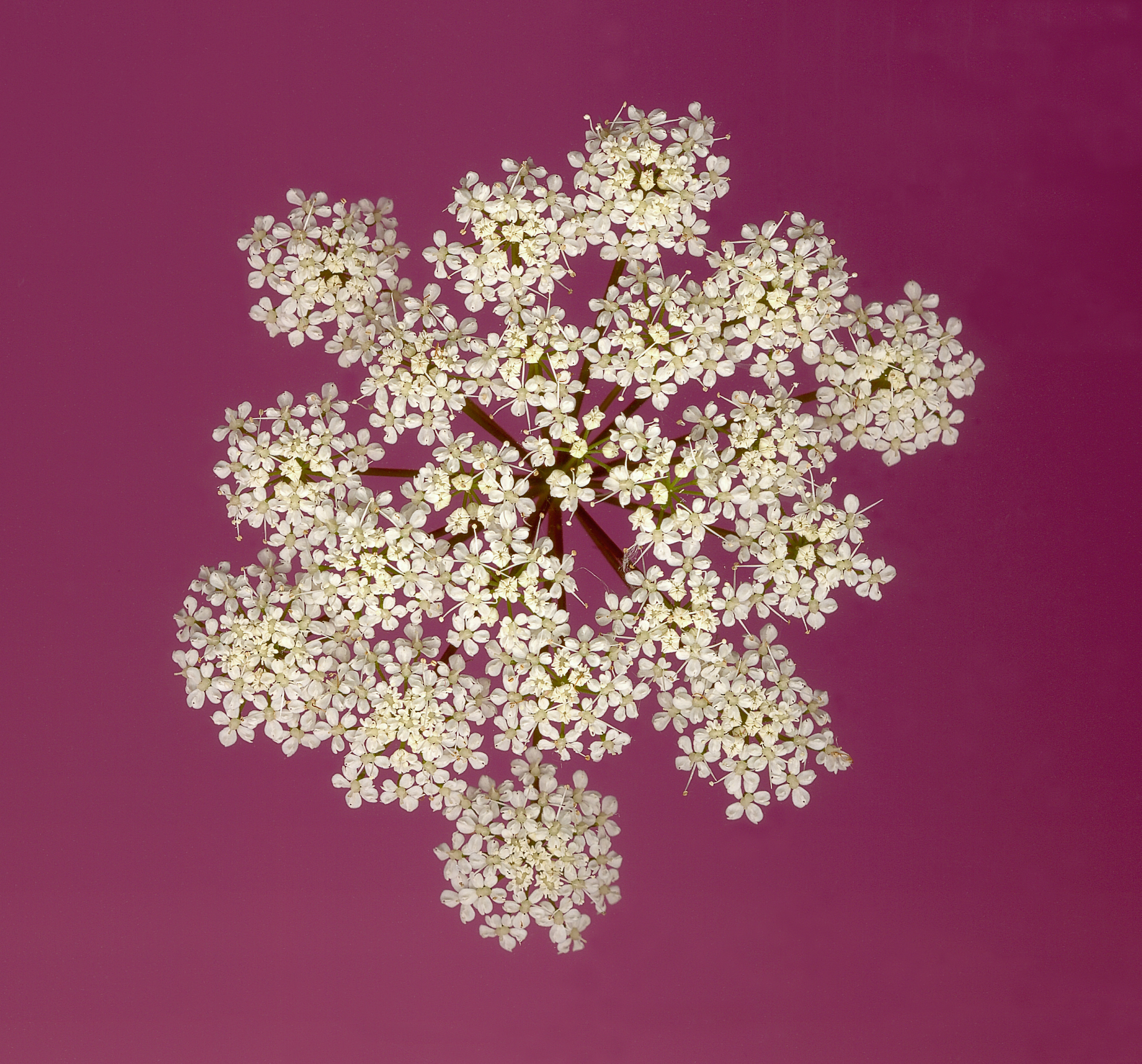
Flowerhead from above, each secondary umbel (umbellet) with 15 to 20 rays

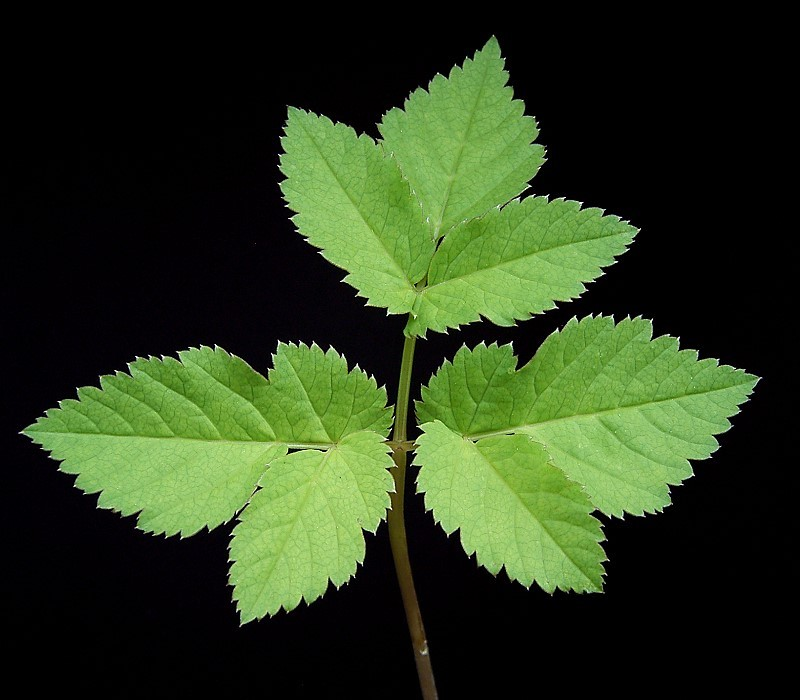
Basal leaf

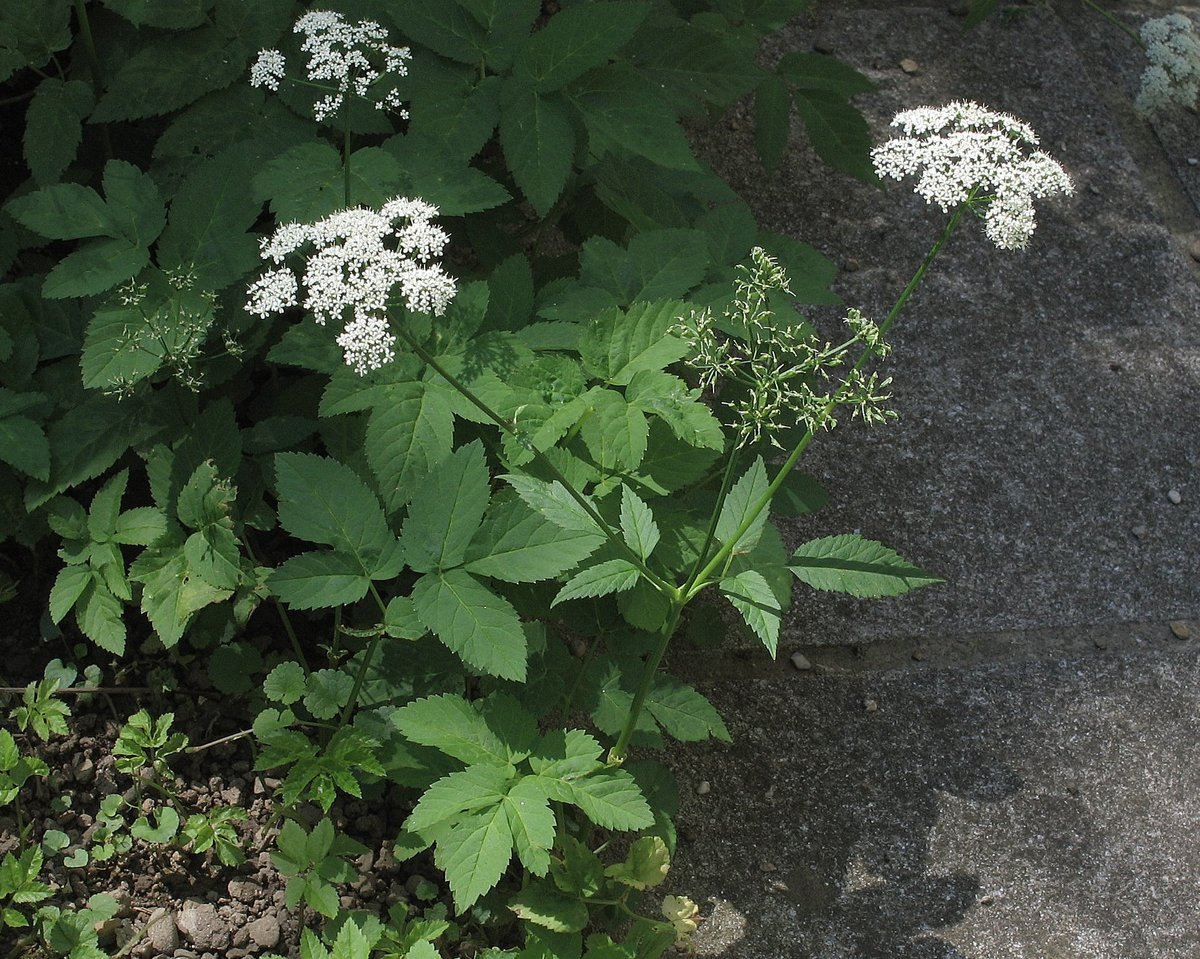
Entire plant

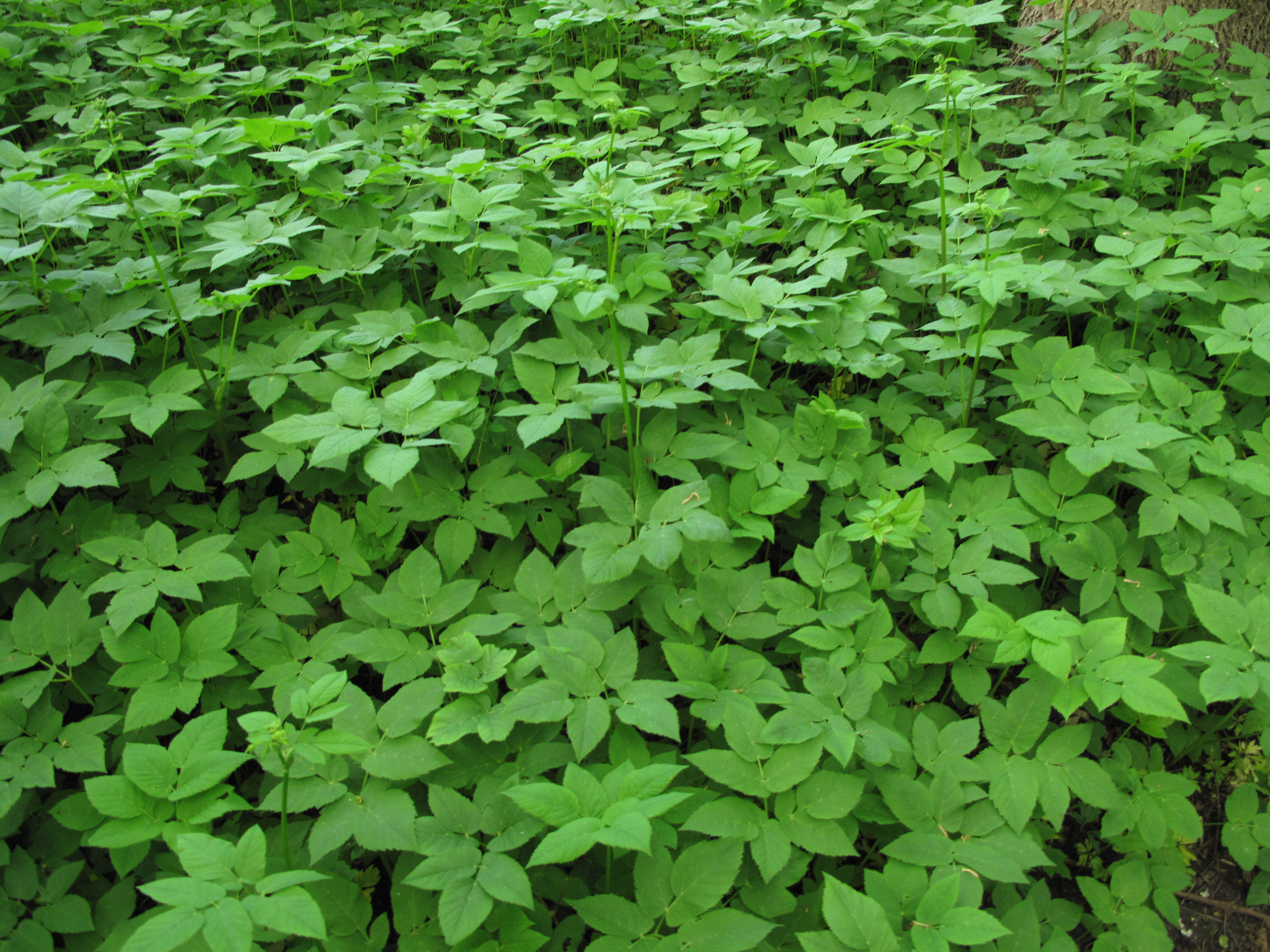
Spreading habit

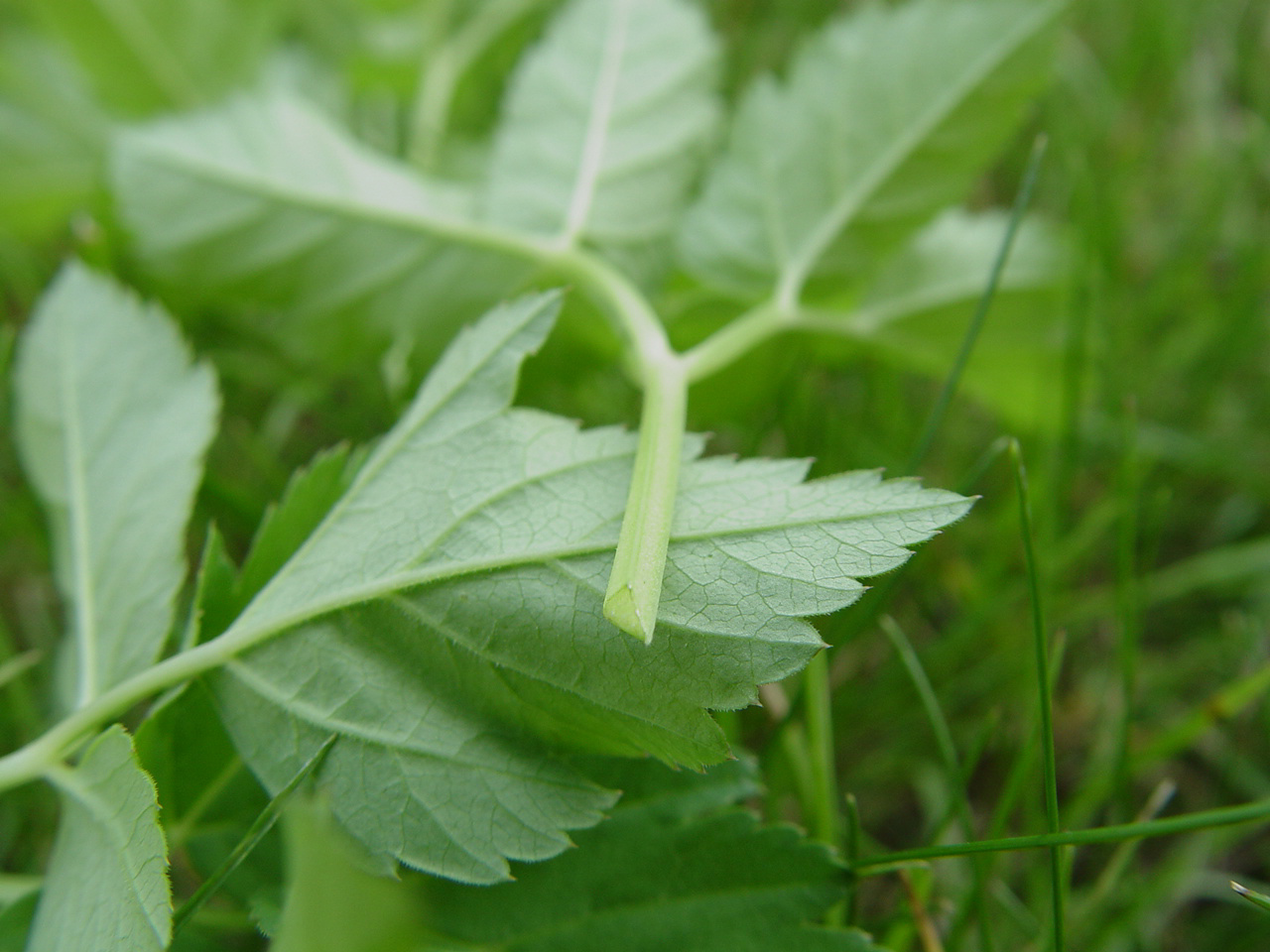
Triangular stem profile
