= Aegopodium burttii =

Scientific classification
- Kingdom: Plantae
- Clade: Tracheophytes
- Clade: Angiosperms
- Clade: Eudicots
- Clade: Asterids
- Order: Apiales
- Family: Apiaceae
- Genus: Aegopodium
- Species: A. burttii

Binomial name
- Aegopodium burttii Nasir

Species of plant

Aegopodium burttii is a species of flowering plant in the family Apiaceae, native to northern Pakistan. An annual, it is found above the tree line.
