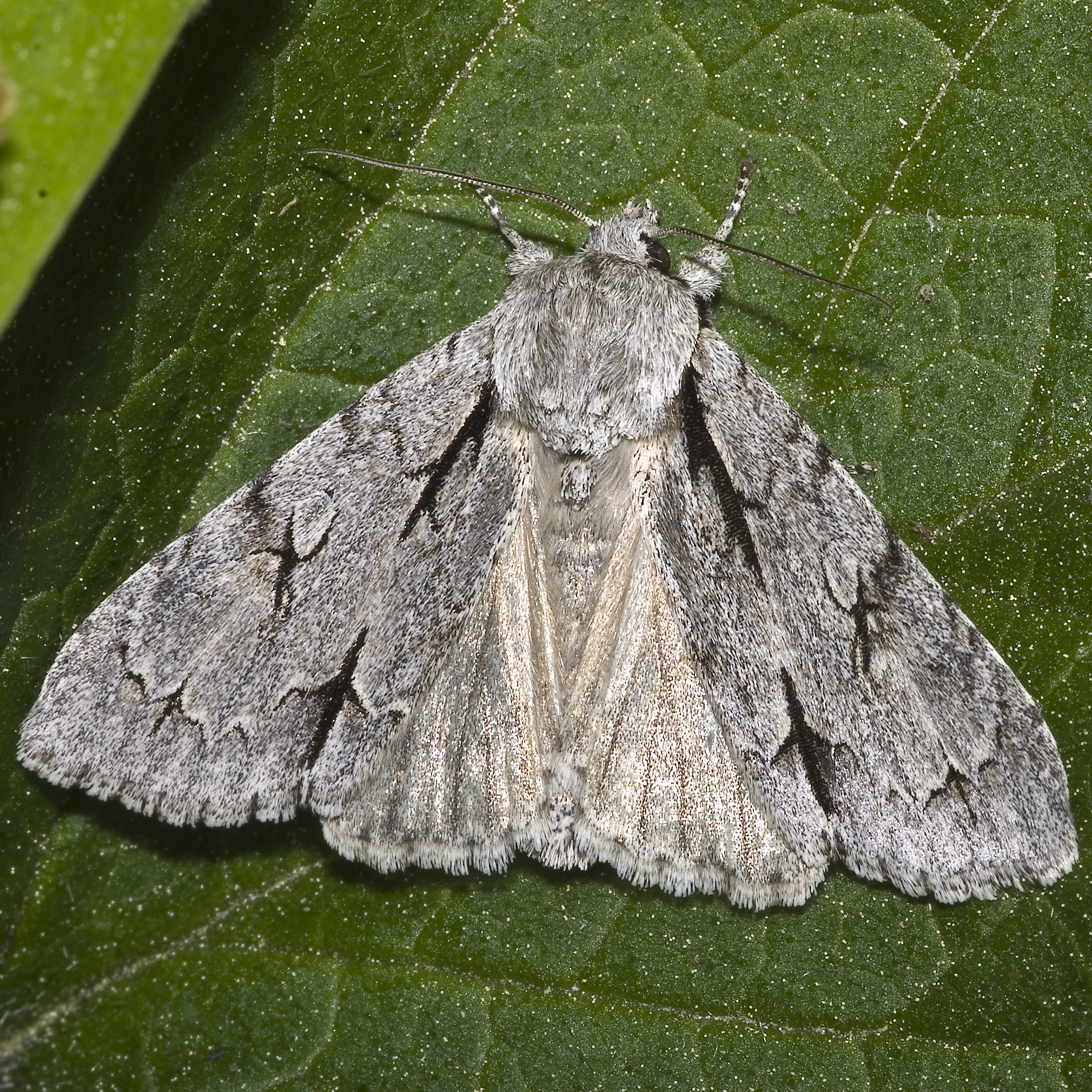

Scientific classification
- Kingdom: Animalia
- Phylum: Arthropoda
- Clade: Pancrustacea
- Class: Insecta
- Order: Lepidoptera
- Superfamily: Noctuoidea
- Family: Noctuidae
- Genus: Acronicta
- Species: A. psi

Binomial name
- Acronicta psi (Linnaeus, 1758)

Synonyms
- Triaena psi

= Grey dagger =

Species of moth

The grey dagger (Acronicta psi) is a moth of the family Noctuidae.

== Distribution ==
This species can be found from Europe and North Africa to northern Iran, central Asia, southern and central Siberia and Mongolia. In the Levant it is found in Lebanon and Israel.

== Habitat ==
These moths mainly inhabit deciduous forests, hedgerows, parks and gardens, at an elevation up to 1,600 metres (5,200 ft) above sea level.

== Description ==
Acronicta psi has a wingspan of 34–45 mm (1.3–1.8 in). These moths have grey forewings with bold black dagger-shaped markings. (The Latin specific name also refers to these markings, as resembling the Greek letter psi, ψ.) The hindwings are dirty grey, generally paler in the male.

The moth is very similar to the dark dagger (Acronicta tridens) and identification is generally only possible by minute examination of the genitalia. See Townsend et al. However, in general this moth is generally darker in colour than the dark dagger and always lacks the white hindwings often present in the male of that species. Moreover, the larvae of the two species are very different.

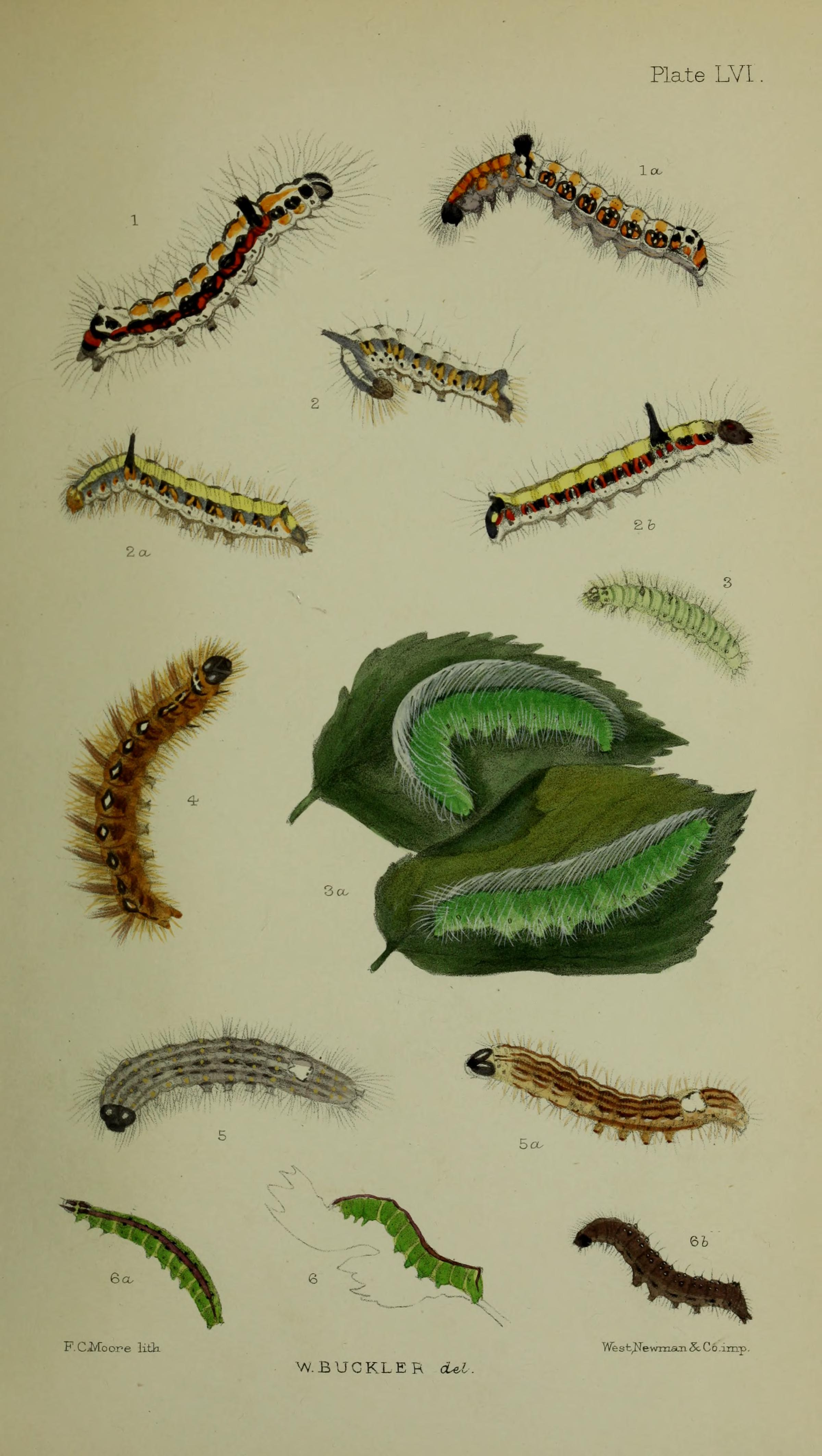
Figures 2, 2a, 2b show larvae after their final moult

The larva of Acronicta psi is quite hairy, greyish or brownish below and black above, with red spots along the sides and a bold yellow stripe along the back. It has a distinctive horn just behind the head (absent from the larva of dark dagger).

== Biology ==
The grey dagger flies at night from June to August (Note: The flight season refers to the British Isles. This may vary in other parts of their range.) and is attracted to light and sometimes to sugar.

It feeds on a wide range of plants, mainly trees and shrubs (see list below). The species overwinters as a pupa.

== Food plants ==
Recorded food plants include:

- Acer platanoides – Norway maple
- Aegopodium podagraria – ground-elder
- Alnus glutinosa, Alnus incana – alder
- Amelanchier spicata
- Betula verrucosa, Betula pubescens – birch
- Corylus avellana – hazel
- Cotoneaster
- Crataegus oxyacantha, Crataegus coccinea – hawthorn
- Hedlundia hybrida (formerly Sorbus hybrida, and S. fennica)
- Malus domestica – apple
- Photinia – red robin
- Populus tremula, Populus suaveolens – poplar spp.
- Prunus domestica, Prunus cerasus, Prunus avium, Prunus padus
- Pyrus communis – pear
- Quercus robur – oak
- Rosa – rose
- Rubus idaeus – bramble
- Salix caprea, Salix phylicifolia – willow
- Sorbus aucuparia; Sorbus intermedia; Hedlundia hybrida (formerly Sorbus hybrida, and S. fennica)
- Spiraea salicifolia
- Tilia – lime
- Ulmus glabra – elm

== Gallery ==
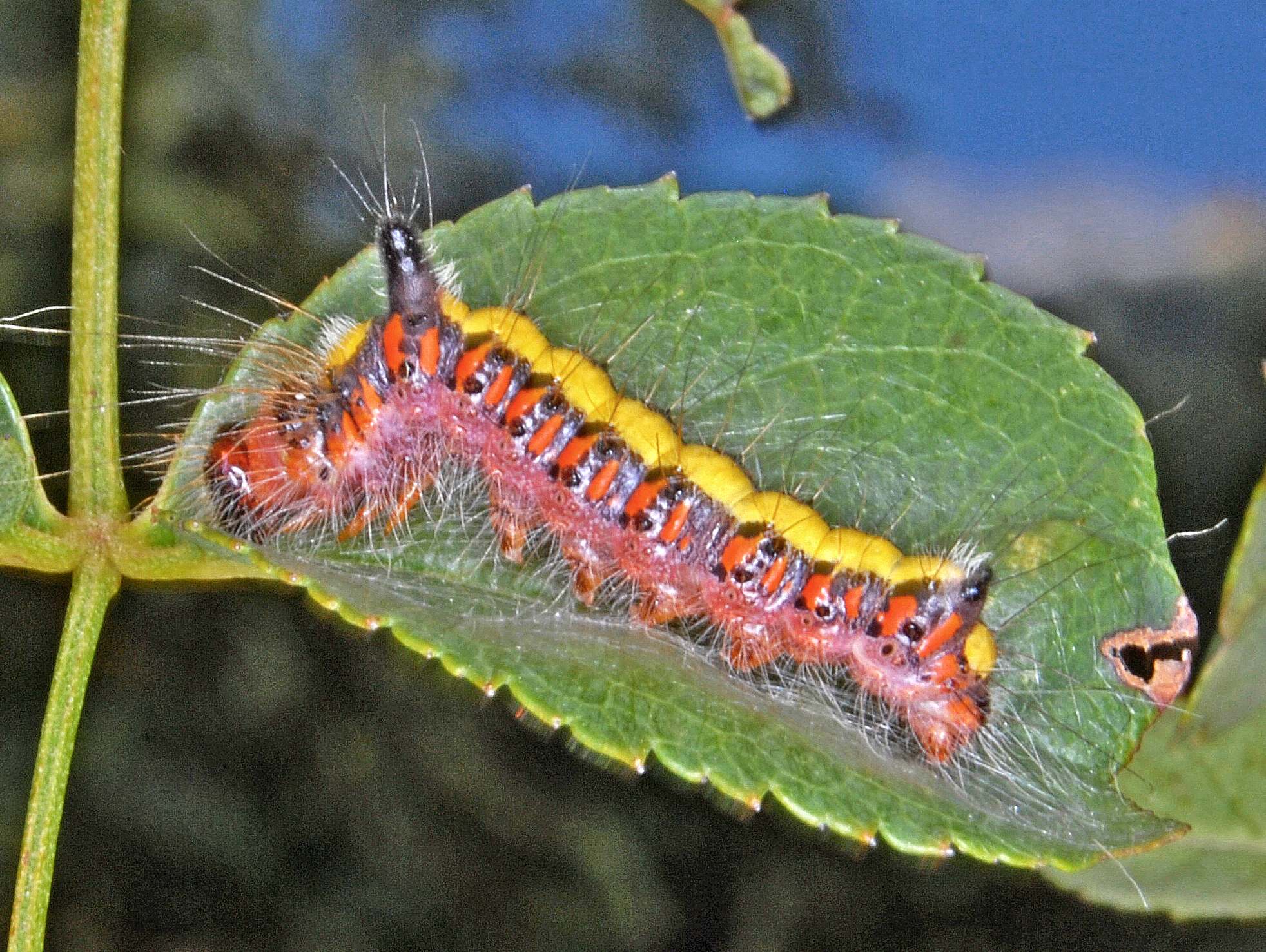
Half-grown caterpillar of Acronicta psi feeding on Rosa canina

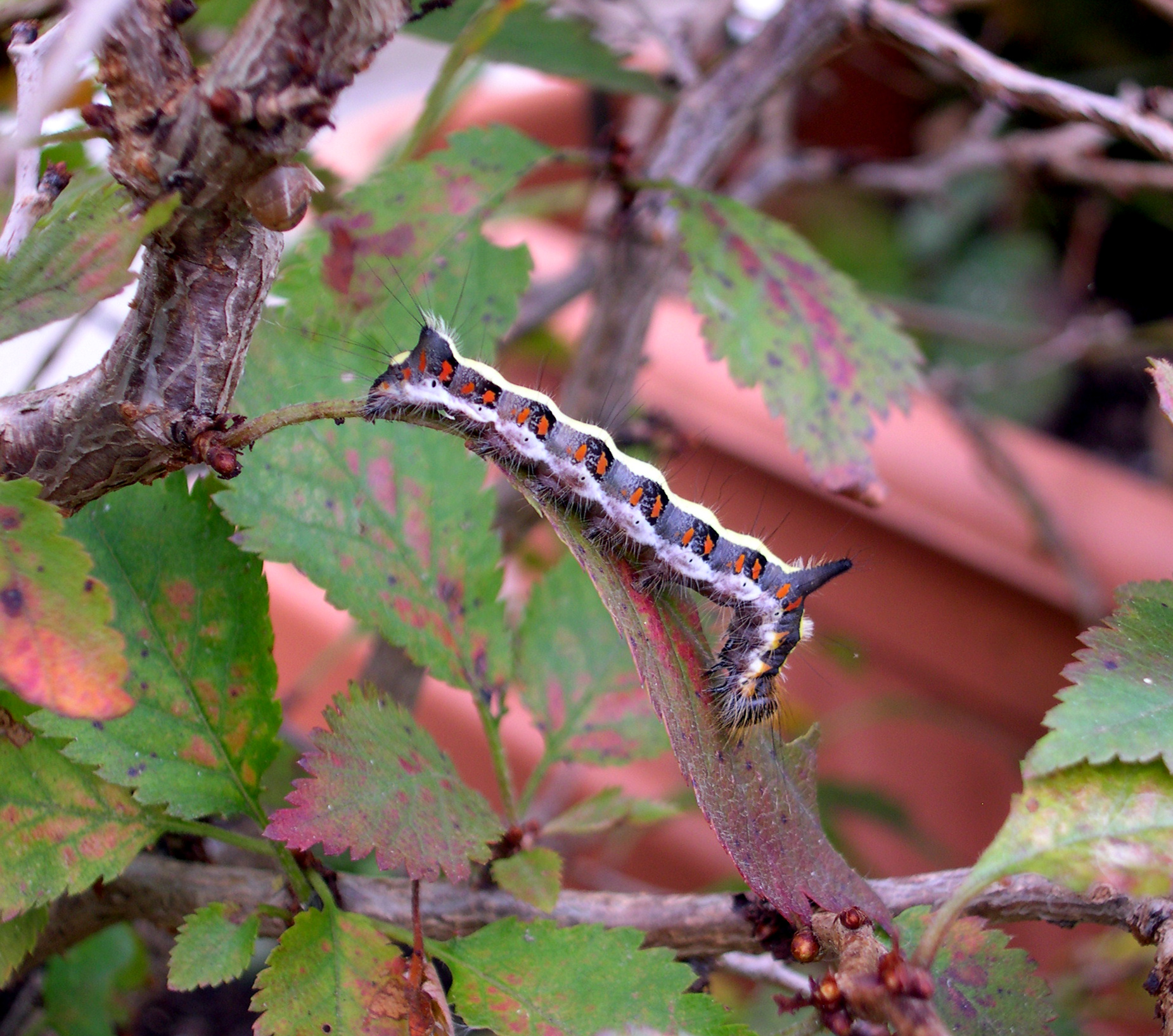
Mature larva feeding on a Japanese cherry tree in early autumn

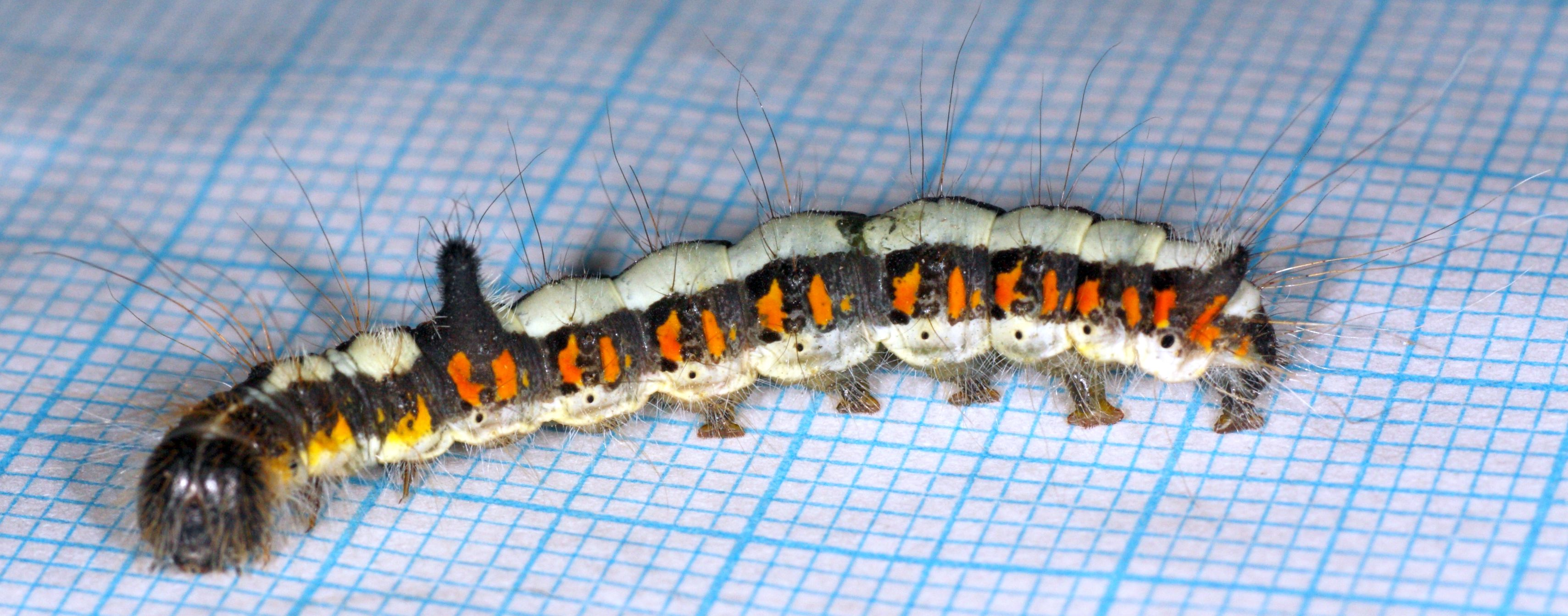
Mature larva in early autumn

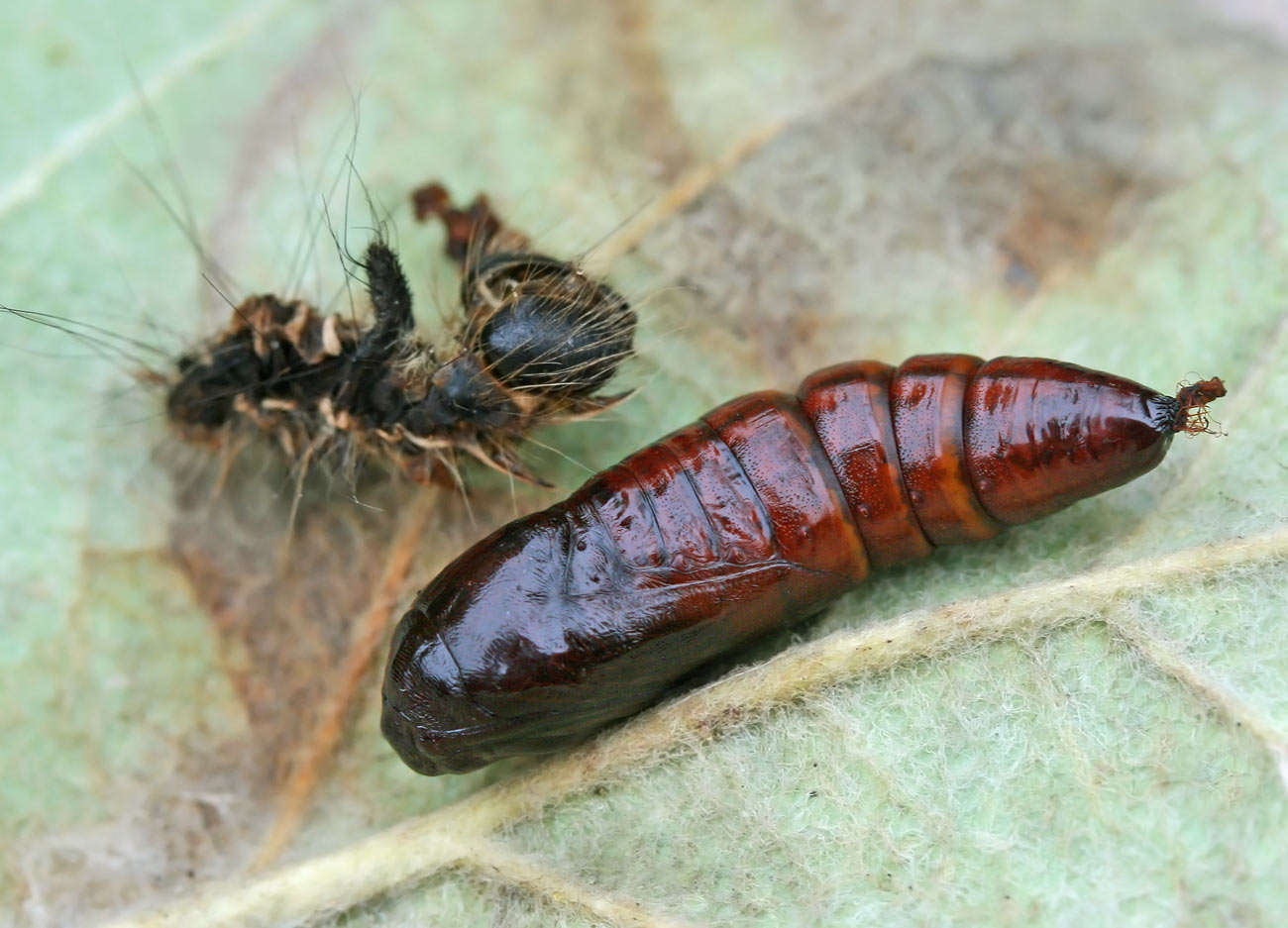
Pupa

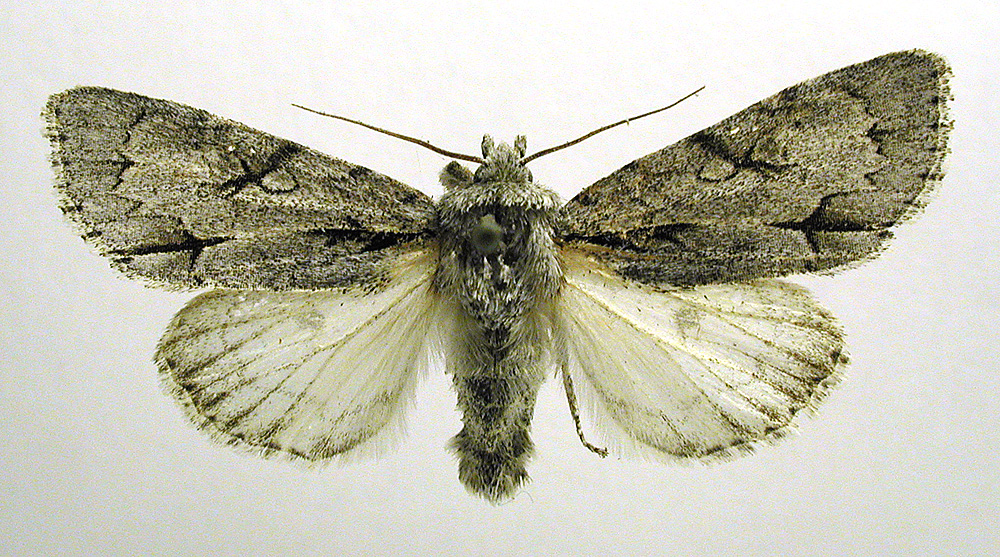
Imago. Mounted specimen

== Bibliography ==
- Chinery, Michael Collins Guide to the Insects of Britain and Western Europe 1986 (Reprinted 1991)
- Skinner, Bernard Colour Identification Guide to Moths of the British Isles 1984
