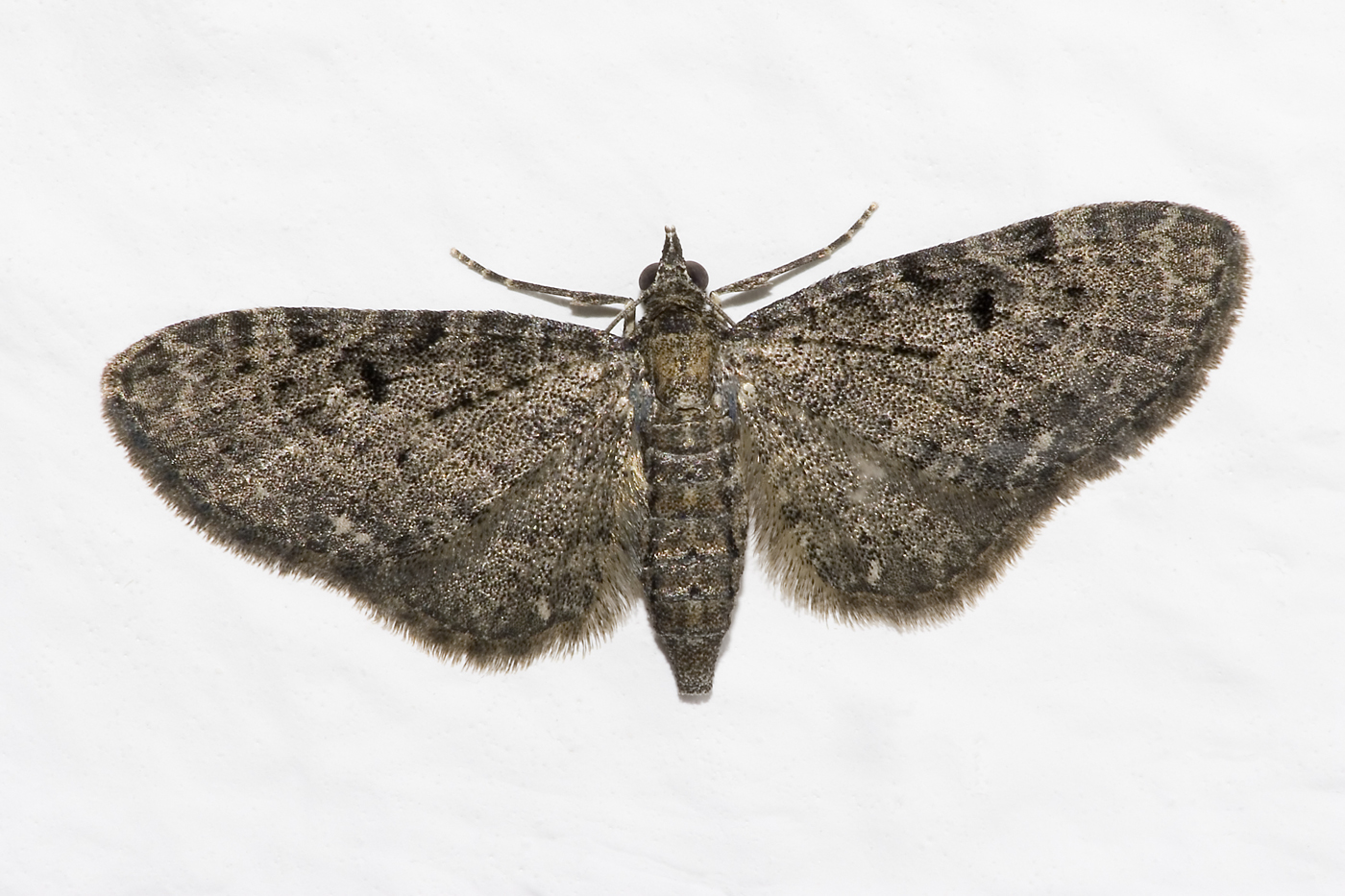

Scientific classification
- Kingdom: Animalia
- Phylum: Arthropoda
- Class: Insecta
- Order: Lepidoptera
- Family: Geometridae
- Genus: Eupithecia
- Species: E. virgaureata

Binomial name
- Eupithecia virgaureata Doubleday, 1861

Synonyms
- Eupithecia notata Dietze, 1913; Eupithecia offirmata Speyer, 1869

= Golden-rod pug =

Goldenrod pug

Species of moth

The goldenrod pug (Eupithecia virgaureata) is a moth of the family Geometridae. The species was first described by Henry Doubleday in 1861. It is found throughout the Palearctic region. In the British Isles it is widespread but rather locally distributed.

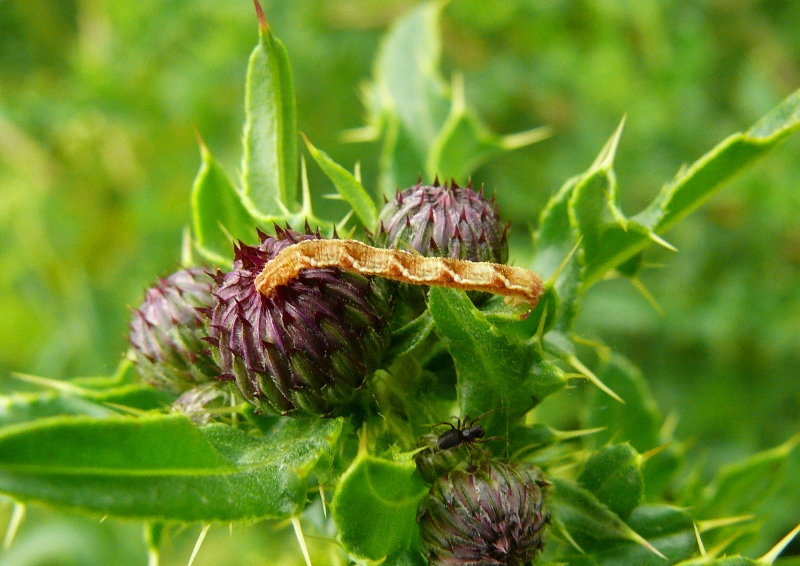
Larva

The ground colour of the forewings is pale grey brownish or fuscous, occasionally with an ochreous tinge, darker along the costa, and are marked with distinctive pale fascia and a whitish tornal spot. The forewing patterning is dominated by a conspicuous, dark discal and smaller costal spots. The obtusely angulated dark grey striae are not defined except on the costa. There is a pale interrupted subterminal line. Melanic forms are quite frequent. The wingspan is 17–20 mm. The larva is slender with short brushes, light yellowish brown with white slashes on the sides and a variety of bell-shaped brown spots on the back.

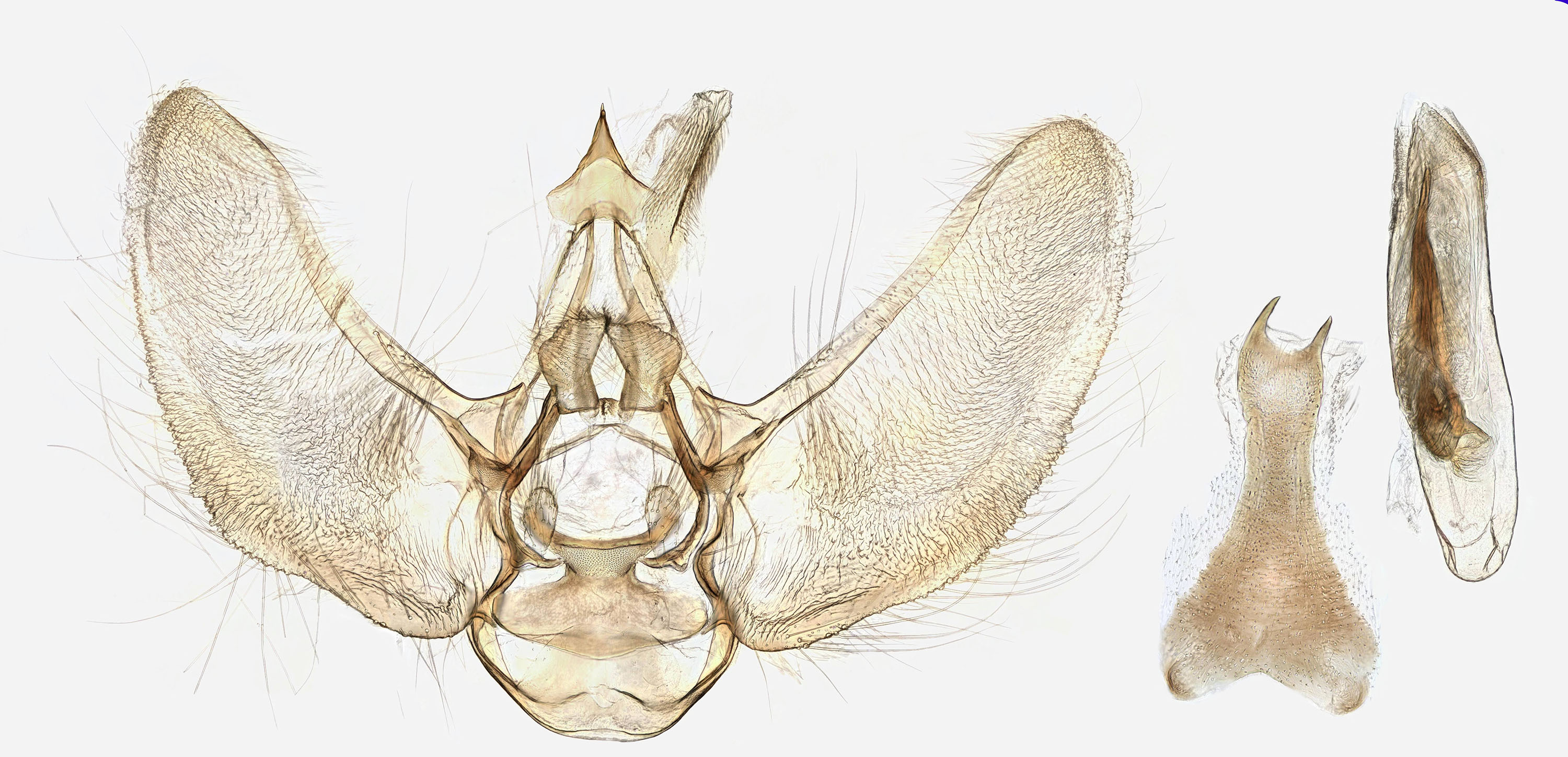
Eupithecia virgaureata male genitalia Trawscoed, North Wales, May 2016

== Similar species ==
- Eupithecia subfuscata
- Eupithecia lariciata

The species is difficult to determine without examining the genitalia.

Two broods are produced each year with the moths flying in May and June and again in August.aestiva Dietze, the summer generation, is considerably smaller.

The caterpillars exhibit different behaviour depending on the generation. The caterpillars of the first generation feed mainly on leaves of deciduous trees, while the second generation is mainly found on the flowers of goldenrod and ragwort. The species overwinters as a pupa.

== Subspecies ==
- Eupithecia virgaureata virgaureata
- Eupithecia virgaureata alternaria Staudinger, 1897 a very weakly marked, sometimes almost unicolorous form from Finmark, Lapland and Transbaikal.
- Eupithecia virgaureata invisa Butler, 1878
