= Megaphorb =

Natural habitat

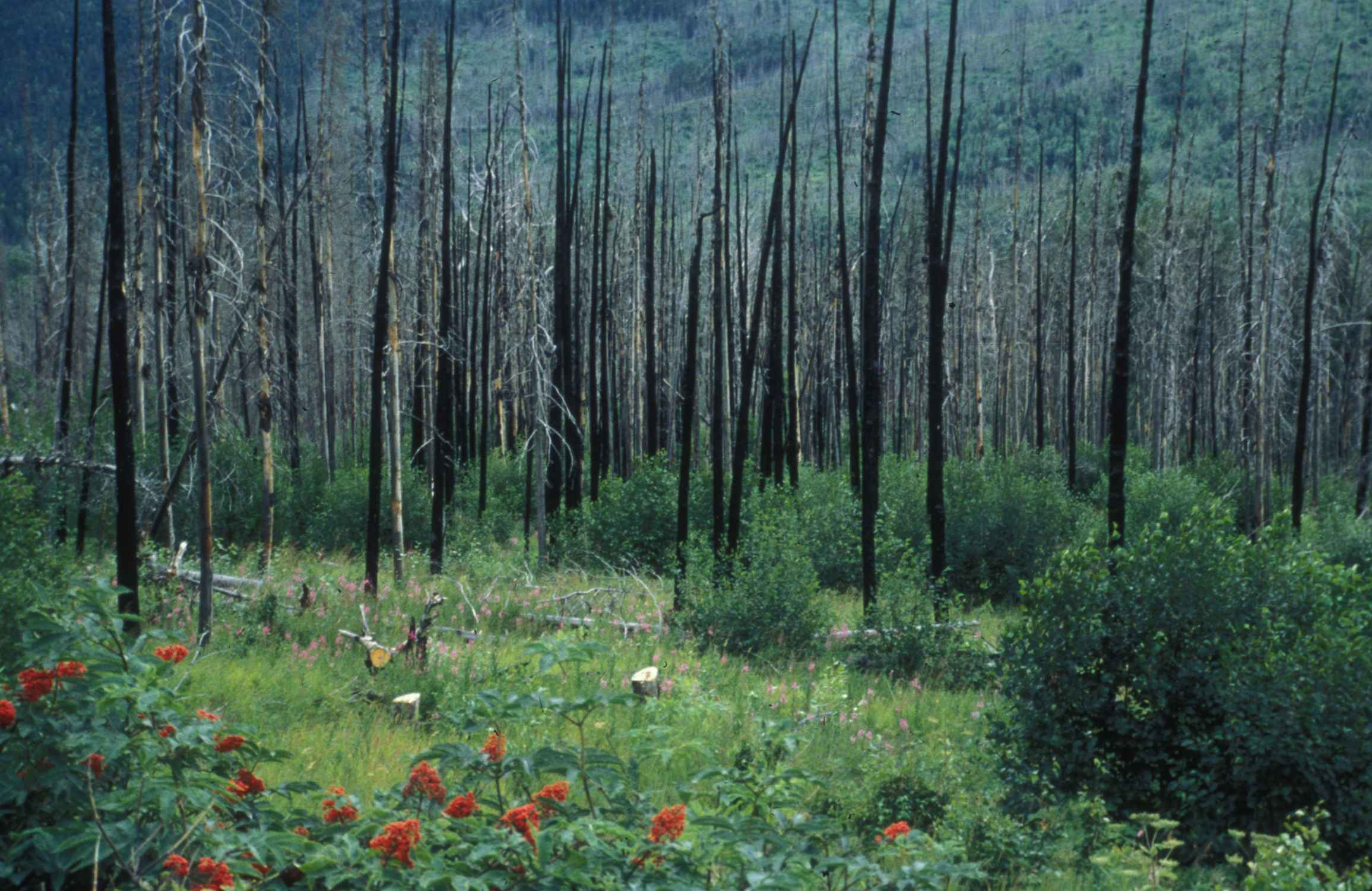
Regrowth of a megaphorb community after forest fire

Megaphorbs are areas with a community of tall, exuberant, perennial herbs. The plant communities provide ground cover and often exist on the margins of wooded areas, terrain that has recently been cleared, or in disturbed areas adjacent to creeks or rivers. These plant communities are often found in mountainous areas.

Areas that a megaphorb layer frequents are margins of wooded areas or forests that have recently been deforested or where logging has occurred. Given the newly open area it provides ample conditions for a megaphorb layer to produce. Other areas in which megaphorbs may appear are along the banks of streams and rivers where there is a lack of plant life and nothing obstructing the upward growth of the plants. The root systems provide structure to riverbanks, reducing erosion in seasons of heavy rainfall. Once peak growing conditions are over, the megaphorb layer begins to die off, which provides decaying plant material to the surrounding area. This feeds detritivore species, and eventually boosts the nutrient ratio within the soil.
