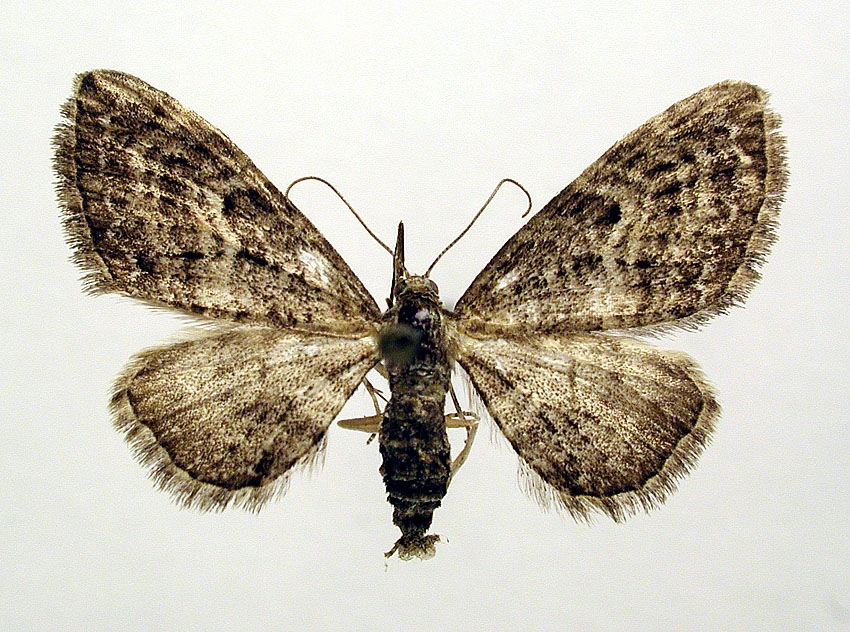

Scientific classification
- Kingdom: Animalia
- Phylum: Arthropoda
- Clade: Pancrustacea
- Class: Insecta
- Order: Lepidoptera
- Family: Geometridae
- Genus: Eupithecia
- Species: E. lariciata

Binomial name
- Eupithecia lariciata (Freyer, 1842)

Synonyms
- Larentia lariciata Freyer, 1842; Tephrocystis luteata bifasciata Dyar, 1904; Eupithecia luteata bifasciata; Eupithecia catskillata Pearsall, 1908; Eupithecia fasciata Taylor, 1910; Eupithecia luteata Packard, 1867; Geometra residuata Hübner, 1817; Eupithecia laboriosa Vojnits, 1977

= Larch pug =

Species of moth

The larch pug (Eupithecia lariciata) is a moth of the family Geometridae. The species can be found in Europe, the Ural Mountains, West and Central Siberia, the Altai Mountains, Transbaikalia, Yakutia, the Far East, Mongolia, Korea, Japan and in North America, from Yukon and Newfoundland to New York and Arizona.

The wingspan is 19–22 mm. The length of the forewings is 10–12 mm. The ground colour of the forewings is whitish grey with dark crosslines. The median crossline is sharply angulated. There is a series of small dark stains on the costal margin and tuft of white hairs on the thorax. The hindwings are whitish grey with a small dark spot in the tornal area. The larva can be quite variable - brown or green, with or without light longitudinal stripes, with or without a number of bell-shaped dark spots along the back.

== Similar species ==
This species is very like Eupithecia castigata, but the fore wings are rather longer, the ground colour is whiter, and the dark-grey or blackish cross lines are rather more angled and slanting; the hind wings are paler, and especially so on the front margins. It also strongly resembles Eupithecia virgaureata and Eupithecia subfuscata.A correct determination can only be made by examination of the genitalia.

The moths fly in one generation from May to June. They are attracted to light.

The caterpillars feed on larch.

== Subspecies ==
Eupithecia lariciata mesodeicta was raised to species rank in 2008.
