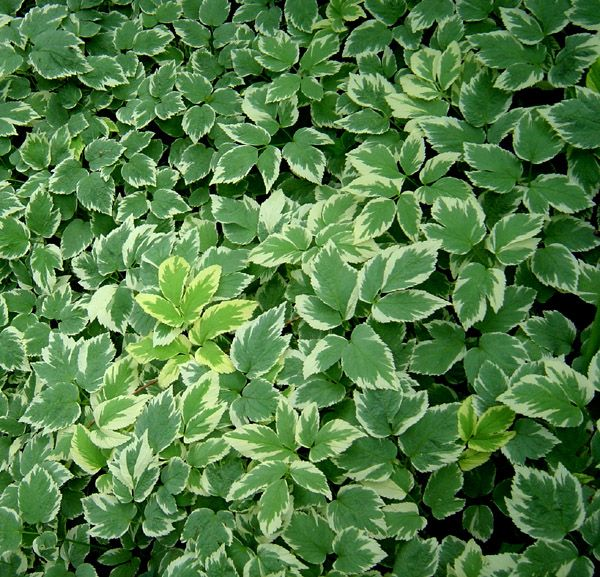
- Aegopodium podagraria

Scientific classification
- Kingdom: Plantae
- Clade: Tracheophytes
- Clade: Angiosperms
- Clade: Eudicots
- Clade: Asterids
- Order: Apiales
- Family: Apiaceae
- Subfamily: Apioideae
- Tribe: Careae
- Genus: Aegopodium; L.

Synonyms
- Aegopodion St.-Lag., orth. var.; Chamaele Miq.; Podagraria Hill; Pseudopimpinella F.Ghahrem., Khajepiri & Mozaff.

= Aegopodium =

Genus of flowering plants

Aegopodium is a plant genus of the family Apiaceae native to Europe and western Asia. It is represented by about twelve species, all are herbs. Flowers are compounded, umbels appearing in spring-summer and are visited by many types of insect pollinators. Fruit consists of two-winged or ribbed nuts that separate on ripening.

The most well-known member is the Aegopodium podagraria, the ground elder also known as snow-on-the-mountain, Bishop's weed, goutweed, native to Europe and Asia. It is variegated green and white that sometimes reverts to solid green within a patch. Small, white, five-petal flowers are held about three feet high, above the leaves, in flat topped clusters. Underground are long white branching rhizomes that vaguely resemble quackgrass. Regarded as an ecological threat, goutweed is aggressive, invasive and forms dense patches reducing species diversity in the ground layer. On the other hand, because of this, it is often used as a low maintenance ground cover.

== Cultivation ==
Plants from this genus are frost hardy but drought tender, preferring moist well-drained soil in an open sunny position. They can be propagated from seed or rhizome.

== Species ==
- Aegopodium alpestre Ledeb.
- Aegopodium burttii Nasir
- Aegopodium decumbens (Thunb.) Pimenov & Zakharova
- Aegopodium handelii H.Wolff
- Aegopodium henryi Diels
- Aegopodium kashmiricum (R.R.Stewart ex Dunn) Pimenov
- Aegopodium komarovii (Karjagin) Pimenov & Zakharova
- Aegopodium latifolium Turcz.
- Aegopodium nadeshdae (Stepanov) Stepanov
- Aegopodium podagraria L.
- Aegopodium tadshikorum Schischk.
- Aegopodium tribracteolatum Schmalh.
