= List of agricultural pest nematode species =

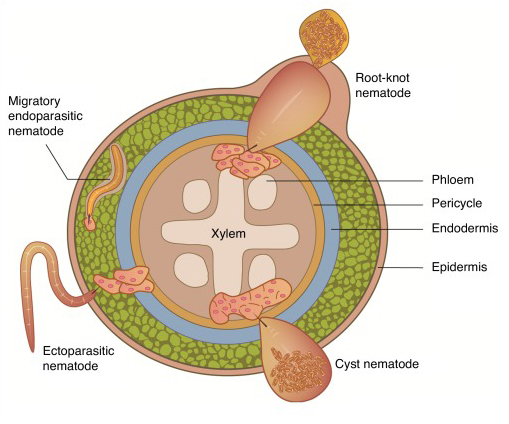
Feeding types of plant-parasitic nematodes

This article is an attempt to list all agricultural pest nematodes. Species are sorted in alphabetical order of Latin name.

== A ==
- Achlysiella williamsi
- Anguina agrostis
- Anguina amsinckiae
- Anguina australis
- Anguina balsamophila
- Anguina funesta
- Anguina graminis
- Anguina spermophaga
- Anguina tritici
- Aphelenchoides arachidis
- Aphelenchoides besseyi
- Aphelenchoides fragariae
- Aphelenchoides parietinus
- Aphelenchoides ritzemabosi
- Aphelenchoides subtenuis

== B ==
- Belonolaimus gracilis
- Belonolaimus longicaudatus

== C ==
- Craspedonema elegans

== D ==
- Ditylenchus africanus
- Ditylenchus angustus
- Ditylenchus destructor
- Ditylenchus dipsaci
- Dolichodorus heterocephalus

== G ==
- Globodera pallida
- Globodera rostochiensis
- Globodera tabacum

== H ==
- Helicotylenchus dihystera
- Hemicriconemoides kanayaensis
- Hemicriconemoides mangiferae
- Hemicycliophora arenaria
- Heterodera avenae
- Heterodera cajani
- Heterodera carotae
- Heterodera ciceri
- Hoplolaimus galeatus
- Heterodera glycines (Soybean cyst nematode)
- Hoplolaimus indicus
- Hoplolaimus magnistylus
- Hoplolaimus seinhorsti
- Hoplolaimus uniformis

== L ==
- Longidorus africanus
- Longidorus maximus
- Longidorus sylphus

== M ==
- Meloidogyne acronea
- Meloidogyne arenaria
- Meloidogyne artiellia
- Meloidogyne brevicauda
- Meloidogyne chitwoodi
- Meloidogyne enterolobii
- Meloidogyne hapla (Northern root-knot nematode)
- Meloidogyne incognita
- Meloidogyne javanica
- Meloidogyne naasi
- Meloidogyne partityla
- Meloidogyne thamesi
- Merlinius brevidens
- Mesocriconema xenoplax

== N ==
- Nacobbus aberrans

== P ==
- Paralongidorus maximus
- Paratrichodorus minor
- Paratylenchus curvitatus
- Paratylenchus elachistus
- Paratylenchus hamatus
- Paratylenchus macrophallus
- Paratylenchus microdorus
- Paratylenchus projectus
- Paratylenchus tenuicaudatus
- Pratylenchus alleni
- Pratylenchus vulnus

== Q ==
- Quinisulcius acutus
- Quinisulcius capitatus

== R ==
- Radopholus similis

== T ==
- Tylenchorhynchus brevilineatus
- Tylenchorhynchus claytoni
- Tylenchorhynchus dubius
- Tylenchorhynchus maximus
- Tylenchorhynchus nudus
- Tylenchorhynchus phaseoli
- Tylenchorhynchus vulgaris
- Tylenchorhynchus zeae
- Tylenchulus semipenetrans

== X ==
- Xiphinema americanum
- Xiphinema bakeri
- Xiphinema brevicolle
- Xiphinema diversicaudatum
- Xiphinema index
- Xiphinema insigne
- Xiphinema rivesi
- Xiphinema vuittenezi

== See also ==
- Cereal cyst nematode
- Coffee root-knot nematode
- Foliar nematode
- Potato cyst nematode
