= List of Scaptomyza species =

This is a list of 270 species in Scaptomyza, a genus of vinegar flies in the family Drosophilidae.

== Scaptomyza species ==
- Scaptomyza aberrans Hardy, 1965^{i c g}
- Scaptomyza abrupta Hackman^{i c g}
- Scaptomyza acronastes Hardy, 1965^{i c g}
- Scaptomyza acuta Nishiharu, 1979^{c g}
- Scaptomyza adunca Hardy, 1965^{i c g}
- Scaptomyza adusta (Loew, 1862)^{i c g b}
- Scaptomyza affinicuspidata Hardy, 1965^{i c g}
- Scaptomyza albovittata (Malloch)^{i c g}
- Scaptomyza aloha Hackman^{i c g}
- Scaptomyza amplialata Takada, Beppu & Toda, 1979^{c g}
- Scaptomyza ampliloba (Hardy, 1967)^{c g}
- Scaptomyza andina Wheeler & Takada, 1966^{c g}
- Scaptomyza anechocerca Hardy, 1965^{i c g}
- Scaptomyza angustipennis (Frey, 1954)^{c g}
- Scaptomyza anomala Hardy, 1965^{i c g}
- Scaptomyza apicata (Thomson, 1969)^{i c g}
- Scaptomyza apiciguttula Hardy, 1965^{i}
- Scaptomyza apicigutulla Hardy, 1965^{c g}
- Scaptomyza apicipuncta Malloch, 1934^{c g}
- Scaptomyza apponopusilla Hardy, 1965^{c g}
- Scaptomyza apponpusilla Hardy, 1965^{i g}
- Scaptomyza argentifrons Hardy, 1965^{i c g}
- Scaptomyza articulata Hardy, 1965^{i c g}
- Scaptomyza atahualpa Hackman, 1959^{c g}
- Scaptomyza atlantica Hackman, 1955^{c g}
- Scaptomyza australis Malloch, 1923^{c g}
- Scaptomyza baechlii Sidorenko, 1993^{c g}
- Scaptomyza basiloba Hardy, 1965^{i c g}
- Scaptomyza bicolor Malloch, 1934^{c g}
- Scaptomyza bilobata Hardy, 1965^{i c g}
- Scaptomyza bipars Hardy, 1965^{i c g}
- Scaptomyza bipunctipennis Wheeler, 1952^{i c g}
- Scaptomyza biseta Malloch, 1932^{c g}
- Scaptomyza bogotae Wheeler & Takada, 1966^{c g}
- Scaptomyza boninensis Okada, 1973^{c g}
- Scaptomyza brachycerca Hardy, 1965^{i c g}
- Scaptomyza brevilamellata (Frey, 1954)^{c g}
- Scaptomyza brunnimaculata Hardy, 1965^{i c g}
- Scaptomyza bryani (Wirth, 1952)^{c g}
- Scaptomyza bryanti Hackman^{i c g}
- Scaptomyza buccata Hackman^{i c g}
- Scaptomyza budnikae Brncic, 1983^{c g}
- Scaptomyza caliginosa Hardy, 1967^{c g}
- Scaptomyza camptochaites Hardy, 1965^{i c g}
- Scaptomyza carinata Okada, 1973^{c g}
- Scaptomyza cerina Hardy, 1965^{i c g}
- Scaptomyza chauliodon (Hardy, 1965)^{c g}
- Scaptomyza choi Kang, Lee & Bahng, 1965^{c g}
- Scaptomyza chylizosoma (Seguy, 1938)^{c g}
- Scaptomyza clavata Okada, 1973^{c g}
- Scaptomyza clavifera Wheeler & Takada, 1966^{c g}
- Scaptomyza cnecosoma Hardy, 1965^{i c g}
- Scaptomyza cochleata Burla, 1957^{c g}
- Scaptomyza concinna Hardy, 1965^{i c g}
- Scaptomyza confusa Hardy, 1965^{i c g}
- Scaptomyza connata Hardy, 1965^{i c g}
- Scaptomyza consimilis Hackman, 1955^{c g}
- Scaptomyza contestata (Hardy, 1967)^{c g}
- Scaptomyza coquilletti Wheeler & Takada, 1966^{c g}
- Scaptomyza cornuta Hardy, 1965^{i c g}
- Scaptomyza crassifemur (Grimshaw, 1901)^{c g}
- Scaptomyza cryptoloba Hardy, 1965^{i c g}
- Scaptomyza ctenophora Hardy, 1965^{i c g}
- Scaptomyza cuspidata Hardy, 1965^{i c g}
- Scaptomyza cyrandraea Hardy, 1965^{i g}
- Scaptomyza cyrtandrae Hardy, 1965^{c g}
- Scaptomyza dankoi Wheeler & Takada, 1966^{c g}
- Scaptomyza decepta Hardy, 1965^{i c g}
- Scaptomyza deemingi Tsacas, 1972^{c g}
- Scaptomyza deludens Hardy, 1967^{c g}
- Scaptomyza dentata Hardy, 1965^{i c g}
- Scaptomyza denticauda Malloch, 1934^{c g}
- Scaptomyza devexa Hardy, 1965^{i c g}
- Scaptomyza diaphorocerca Hardy, 1965^{i c g}
- Scaptomyza domita Hardy, 1965^{i c g}
- Scaptomyza dorsalis Seguy, 1938^{c g}
- Scaptomyza dubautiae Hardy, 1965^{i c g}
- Scaptomyza dubia Hardy, 1965^{i c g}
- Scaptomyza elmoi Takada, 1970^{c g}
- Scaptomyza eurystylata Hardy, 1965^{i c g}
- Scaptomyza evexa Hardy, 1965^{i c g}
- Scaptomyza exigua (Grimshaw)^{i c g}
- Scaptomyza exilis McEvey, 1990^{c g}
- Scaptomyza fastigata Hardy, 1965^{i c g}
- Scaptomyza finitima Hardy, 1965^{i c g}
- Scaptomyza flava Fallen, 1823^{i c g b}
- Scaptomyza flavella Harrison, 1959^{c g}
- Scaptomyza flavida Hardy, 1965^{i c g}
- Scaptomyza flavifacies (Malloch, 1932)^{c g}
- Scaptomyza flaviventris Hackman, 1959^{i c g}
- Scaptomyza freyi Hackman, 1959^{c g}
- Scaptomyza frustulifera (Frey, 1954)^{c g}
- Scaptomyza fuscifrons Hackman^{i c g}
- Scaptomyza fuscinervis Malloch, 1924^{c g}
- Scaptomyza fuscitarsis Harrison, 1959^{c g}
- Scaptomyza gilvivirilia Hardy, 1965^{i g}
- Scaptomyza gilvivirlia Hardy, 1965^{c g}
- Scaptomyza glauca (Hardy, 1965)^{c g}
- Scaptomyza gracilis (Walker, 1853)^{c g}
- Scaptomyza grahami Hackman, 1959^{c g}
- Scaptomyza graminum (Fallen, 1823)^{i c g}
- Scaptomyza griseola (Zetterstedt, 1847)^{c g}
- Scaptomyza hackmani Hardy, 1965^{i c g}
- Scaptomyza hamata Hardy, 1965^{i c g}
- Scaptomyza hardyi Hackman^{i c g}
- Scaptomyza heedi Wheeler & Takada, 1966^{c g}
- Scaptomyza helvola (Frey, 1954)^{c g}
- Scaptomyza hennigi Hackman, 1959^{c g}
- Scaptomyza hexasticha Okada, 1973^{c g}
- Scaptomyza himalayana Takada, 1970^{c g}
- Scaptomyza hirsuta Wheeler, 1949^{i c g}
- Scaptomyza horaeoptera Tsacas & Cogan, 1976^{c g}
- Scaptomyza horrida (Frey, 1954)^{c g}
- Scaptomyza hsui Hackman, 1955^{i c g}
- Scaptomyza ichneumon (Knab, 1914)^{c g}
- Scaptomyza impunctata (Frey, 1945)^{c g}
- Scaptomyza inaequalis (Grimshaw)^{i c g}
- Scaptomyza incerta (Frey, 1954)^{c g}
- Scaptomyza inermis Hardy, 1965^{i c g}
- Scaptomyza inflatus (Kaneshiro, 1969)^{c g}
- Scaptomyza infurcula Hardy, 1965^{i c g}
- Scaptomyza innotabilis Hardy, 1965^{i c g}
- Scaptomyza intermedia (Duda, 1927)^{c}
- Scaptomyza intricata Hardy, 1965^{i c g}
- Scaptomyza isopedon Hardy, 1965^{i c g}
- Scaptomyza kaavae (Malloch, 1934)^{c g}
- Scaptomyza kauaiensis Hackman^{i c g}
- Scaptomyza kilembea Tsacas, 1972^{c g}
- Scaptomyza latifrons Malloch, 1932^{c g}
- Scaptomyza latitergum Hardy, 1965^{i c g}
- Scaptomyza levata Hardy, 1965^{i c g}
- Scaptomyza lobifera Hardy, 1965^{i c g}
- Scaptomyza lonchoptera (Hardy, 1965)^{c g}
- Scaptomyza longipecten Hackman^{i c g}
- Scaptomyza longipennis Seguy, 1938^{c g}
- Scaptomyza longisetosa Hackman^{i c g}
- Scaptomyza macroptera Wheeler & Takada, 1966^{c g}
- Scaptomyza maculifera Becker, 1919^{i c g}
- Scaptomyza malada Wheeler and Takada, 1966^{i c g}
- Scaptomyza mateolata McEvey, 1990^{c g}
- Scaptomyza mauiensis (Grimshaw)^{i c g}
- Scaptomyza mecocera Hardy, 1965^{i g}
- Scaptomyza mecocerca Hardy, 1965^{c g}
- Scaptomyza mediana Hardy, 1965^{i c g}
- Scaptomyza mediopallens Hackman^{i c g}
- Scaptomyza melancholica (Duda, 1927)^{c g}
- Scaptomyza melanissima Okada, 1966^{c g}
- Scaptomyza meocerca Hardy, 1965^{c g}
- Scaptomyza merina McEvey, 1990^{c g}
- Scaptomyza mimitantalia Tsacas & Cogan, 1976^{c g}
- Scaptomyza mimula Hardy, 1965^{i c g}
- Scaptomyza mitchelli Hackman^{i c g}
- Scaptomyza molokaiensis Hardy, 1967^{c g}
- Scaptomyza montana Wheeler, 1949^{i g}
- Scaptomyza monticola (Grimshaw)^{i c g}
- Scaptomyza multidenta Hardy, 1965^{i c g}
- Scaptomyza multispinosa Malloch, 1934^{c g}
- Scaptomyza mumfordi Malloch, 1933^{c g}
- Scaptomyza mutica Hardy, 1965^{i c g}
- Scaptomyza nasalis (Grimshaw, 1901)^{c g}
- Scaptomyza neoandina Wheeler & Takada, 1966^{c g}
- Scaptomyza neocyrtandrae Burgunder, Rampasso, & O’Grady, 2022
- Scaptomyza neoevexa O'Grady, Bonacum, Desalle & Val, 2003^{c g}
- Scaptomyza neokauaiensis O'Grady, Bonacum, Desalle & Val, 2003^{c g}
- Scaptomyza neosilvicola O'Grady, Bonacum, Desalle & Val, 2003^{c g}
- Scaptomyza nigricosta Wheeler & Takada, 1966^{c g}
- Scaptomyza nigripalpis Malloch, 1924^{c g}
- Scaptomyza nigrita Wheeler, 1952^{i c g}
- Scaptomyza nigrocella Wheeler, 1949^{i c g}
- Scaptomyza nigrosignata Hardy, 1965^{i c g}
- Scaptomyza noei Brncic, 1955^{c g}
- Scaptomyza oahuensis Hardy, 1967^{c g}
- Scaptomyza obscuricornis (Grimshaw)^{i c g}
- Scaptomyza obscurifrons (Grimshaw)^{i c g}
- Scaptomyza ochromata Hardy, 1965^{i c g}
- Scaptomyza okadai Hackman, 1959^{c g}
- Scaptomyza ostensa Hardy, 1965^{i c g}
- Scaptomyza oxyphallus Tsacas, 1990^{c g}
- Scaptomyza palata (Hardy, 1965)^{c g}
- Scaptomyza pallida (Zetterstedt, 1847)^{i c g b}
- Scaptomyza pallifrons Hackman^{i c g}
- Scaptomyza palmae Hardy, 1965^{i c g}
- Scaptomyza paradusta Wheeler, 1952^{i c g}
- Scaptomyza paralobae Hardy, 1965^{i c g}
- Scaptomyza parandina Wheeler & Takada, 1966^{c g}
- Scaptomyza parasplendens Okada, 1966^{c g}
- Scaptomyza paravittata Wheeler, 1952^{i c g}
- Scaptomyza parva (Grimshaw, 1901)^{c g}
- Scaptomyza pectinifera (Frey, 1954)^{c g}
- Scaptomyza penicula Hardy, 1965^{i c g}
- Scaptomyza perkinsi (Grimshaw, 1901)^{c g}
- Scaptomyza personata Wheeler & Takada, 1966^{c g}
- Scaptomyza philipensis Bock, 1986^{c g}
- Scaptomyza photophilia Hardy, 1965^{i c g}
- Scaptomyza phryxothrix Hardy, 1965^{i c g}
- Scaptomyza picifemorata Hackman, 1959^{c g}
- Scaptomyza platyrhina Hardy, 1967^{c g}
- Scaptomyza pleurolineata Wheeler & Takada, 1966^{c g}
- Scaptomyza polygonia Okada, 1956^{c g}
- Scaptomyza protensa Hardy, 1965^{i c g}
- Scaptomyza prunctivena Hardy, 1965^{i g}
- Scaptomyza pseudovittata Brncic, 1955^{c g}
- Scaptomyza punctivena Hardy, 1965^{c g}
- Scaptomyza pusilla (Grimshaw)^{i c g}
- Scaptomyza pygaea Tsacas, 1990^{c g}
- Scaptomyza quadridentata Hardy, 1965^{i c g}
- Scaptomyza quadriseriata Malloch, 1934^{c g}
- Scaptomyza quadruangulata Singh & Dash, 1993^{c g}
- Scaptomyza recava Hardy, 1965^{i c g}
- Scaptomyza recta Hardy, 1965^{i c g}
- Scaptomyza reducta (Hardy, 1965)^{c g}
- Scaptomyza remota (Walker, 1849)^{c g}
- Scaptomyza retusa Hardy, 1965^{i c g}
- Scaptomyza robusta Hardy, 1965^{i c g}
- Scaptomyza rostrata Hardy, 1965^{i c g}
- Scaptomyza rotundiloba Hardy, 1965^{i c g}
- Scaptomyza ruficornis (Meigen, 1838)^{c g}
- Scaptomyza salvadorae Wheeler & Takada, 1966^{c g}
- Scaptomyza samurai Wheeler & Takada, 1966^{c g}
- Scaptomyza santacruzi Val, 1983^{c g}
- Scaptomyza santahelenica Tsacas & Cogan, 1976^{c g}
- Scaptomyza scoliops Hardy, 1965^{i c g}
- Scaptomyza scoloplichas Hardy, 1965^{i c g}
- Scaptomyza semiflava Hardy, 1965^{i c g}
- Scaptomyza setiger Hardy, 1965^{i c g}
- Scaptomyza setosa Wheeler & Takada, 1966^{c g}
- Scaptomyza setosiloba Hardy, 1965^{i c g}
- Scaptomyza setosiscutellum (Hardy, 1965)^{c g}
- Scaptomyza sichuanica Sidorenko, 1995^{c g}
- Scaptomyza silvata Okada, 1966^{c g}
- Scaptomyza silvicola Hardy, 1965^{i c g}
- Scaptomyza sinica Lin & Ting, 1971^{c g}
- Scaptomyza spiculipennis Takada & Momma, 1975^{c g}
- Scaptomyza spilota Hardy, 1965^{i c g}
- Scaptomyza spinipalpis Seguy, 1934^{c g}
- Scaptomyza stamineifrons Hackman^{i g}
- Scaptomyza stramineifrons Hackman, 1962^{c g}
- Scaptomyza stratifrons Hackman^{i g}
- Scaptomyza striaticeps Wheeler & Takada, 1966^{c g}
- Scaptomyza striatifrons Hackman, 1959^{c g}
- Scaptomyza subandina Wheeler & Takada, 1966^{c g}
- Scaptomyza subsplendens (Duda, 1935)^{c g}
- Scaptomyza substrigata Meijere, 1914^{c g}
- Scaptomyza subvittata Hackman, 1959^{c g}
- Scaptomyza swezeyi (Wirth, 1952)^{c g}
- Scaptomyza taigensis Sidorenko & Toda, 1996^{c g}
- Scaptomyza taiwanica Lin & Ting, 1971^{c g}
- Scaptomyza teinoptera Hackman, 1955^{i c g}
- Scaptomyza tenuata Hardy, 1965^{i c g}
- Scaptomyza terminalis (Loew, 1863)^{i c g}
- Scaptomyza throckmortoni Hardy, 1967^{c g}
- Scaptomyza tistai Kumar & Gupta, 1991^{c g}
- Scaptomyza trivittata Hardy, 1965^{i c g}
- Scaptomyza trochanterata Collin, 1953^{i c g}
- Scaptomyza tumidula Hardy, 1965^{i c g}
- Scaptomyza uliginosa Hardy, 1965^{i c g}
- Scaptomyza umbrosa Hardy, 1965^{i c g}
- Scaptomyza undulata (Grimshaw, 1901)^{c g}
- Scaptomyza unipunctum (Zetterstedt, 1847)^{i c g}
- Scaptomyza univitta Hardy, 1965^{i c g}
- Scaptomyza vagabunda Hardy, 1965^{i c g}
- Scaptomyza varia Hardy, 1965^{i c g}
- Scaptomyza varifrons (Grimshaw)^{i c g}
- Scaptomyza varipicta Hardy, 1965^{i c g}
- Scaptomyza villosa Hardy, 1965^{i c g}
- Scaptomyza vittata (Coquillett, 1895)^{i c g}
- Scaptomyza vittiger (Hardy, 1965)^{c g}
- Scaptomyza waialealeae Hardy, 1965^{i c g}
- Scaptomyza wheeleri Hackman, 1959^{i c g b}
- Scaptomyza xanthopleura Hardy, 1965^{i c g}
- Scaptomyza yakutica Sidorenko & Toda, 1996^{c g}

Data sources: i = ITIS, c = Catalogue of Life, g = GBIF, b = Bugguide.net
