= Boomerangiana =

Scientific classification
- Kingdom: Animalia
- Phylum: Arthropoda
- Subphylum: Chelicerata
- Class: Arachnida
- Order: Araneae
- Infraorder: Araneomorphae
- Family: Thomisidae
- Genus: Boomerangiana; Szymkowiak & Sherwood, 2021
- Species: B. dimidiata

Binomial name
- Boomerangiana dimidiata (L. Koch, 1867)

Genus of crab spiders

Boomerangiana is a monotypic genus of Australian crab spiders in the tribe Misumenini containing the single species, Boomerangiana dimidiata. They are small white spiders, only 2 to 3 millimetres (0.079 to 0.118 in) long, with silvery round abdomen. The species was originally described in 1867 by Ludwig Koch from an immature female found in Brisbane. Though he originally placed it with Xysticus, after several more were found in Rockhampton and Gayndah and more information became available, he moved the species to Diaea. It was moved to its own genus in 2014 named Boomerangia, but was renamed Boomerangiana when it was discovered that the name was already in use for a family of nematodes.

== See also ==
- List of Thomisidae genera
