= Ear (botany) =

Grain-bearing part of a cereal plant

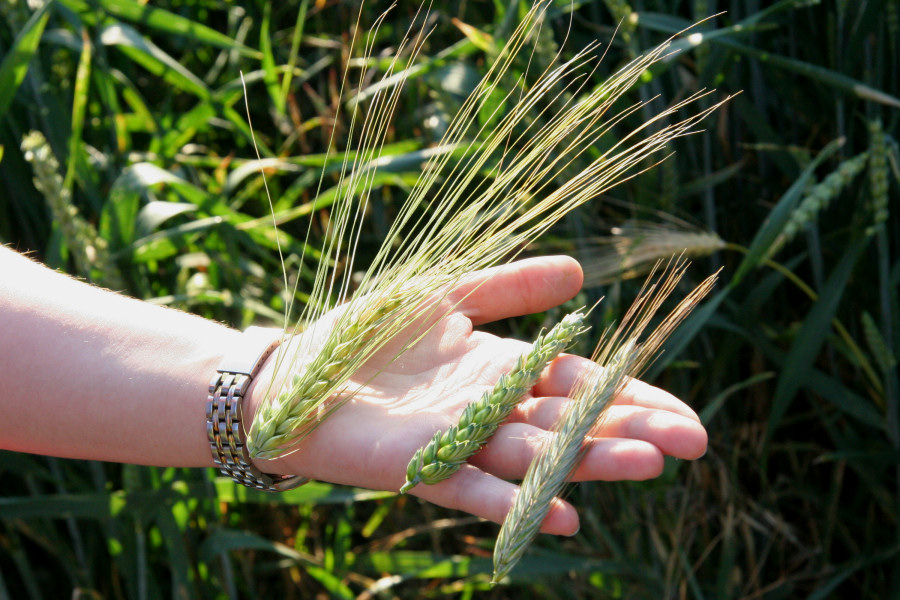
Three unripe ears (of barley, wheat, and rye): each has many awns (bristles)

An ear is the grain-bearing tip part of the stem of a cereal plant, such as wheat or maize. It can also refer to "a prominent lobe in some leaves."

The ear is a spike, consisting of a central stem on which tightly packed rows of flowers grow. These develop into fruits containing the edible seeds. In maize, an ear is protected by leaves called husks. Inside an ear of corn is a corncob.

In some species (including wheat), unripe ears contribute significantly to photosynthesis, in addition to the leaves lower down the plant.

A parasite known as Anguina tritici (ear cockle) specifically affects the ears on wheat and rye by destroying the tissues and stems during growth. The parasite has been eradicated in most countries (with the exception of North Africa and West Asia) by using the crop rotation system.
