= Leptothrix =

Leptothrix may refer to:

- Leptothrix (bacterium), a genus of bacteria in the order Burkholderiales
- Leptothrix (spider), a genus of spiders in the family Linyphiidae
