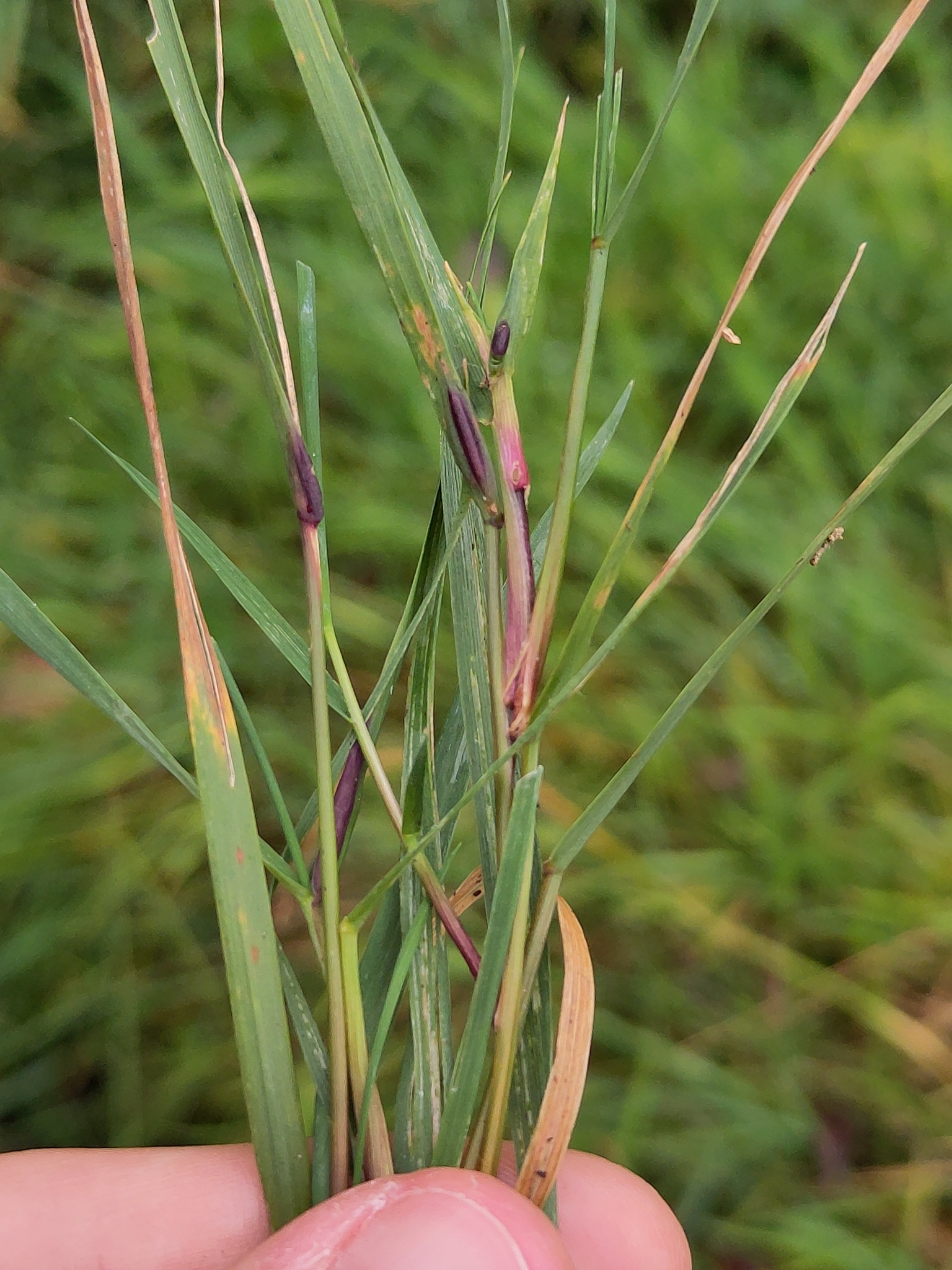
- Galls of Subanguina graminophila on the leaves of Agrostis stolonifera

Scientific classification
- Kingdom: Animalia
- Phylum: Nematoda
- Class: Secernentea
- Order: Tylenchida
- Family: Anguinidae
- Genus: Subanguina
- Species: S. graminophila

Binomial name
- Subanguina graminophila (Goodey, 1933)

Synonyms
- Ditylenchus graminophilus; Heteroanguina graminophila

= Subanguina graminophila =

Species of roundworm

Subanguina graminophila is a plant-pathogenic nematode. It forms galls on the leaves of grasses. It is known from grasses in the genera Agrostis (the main host), Bromus, and Calamagrostis. It has been found at a range of elevations, from sea level to at least 405m elevation, in a variety of habitats including brackish grassland above saltmarsh, semi-improved grassland, and heath.

== Gallery ==
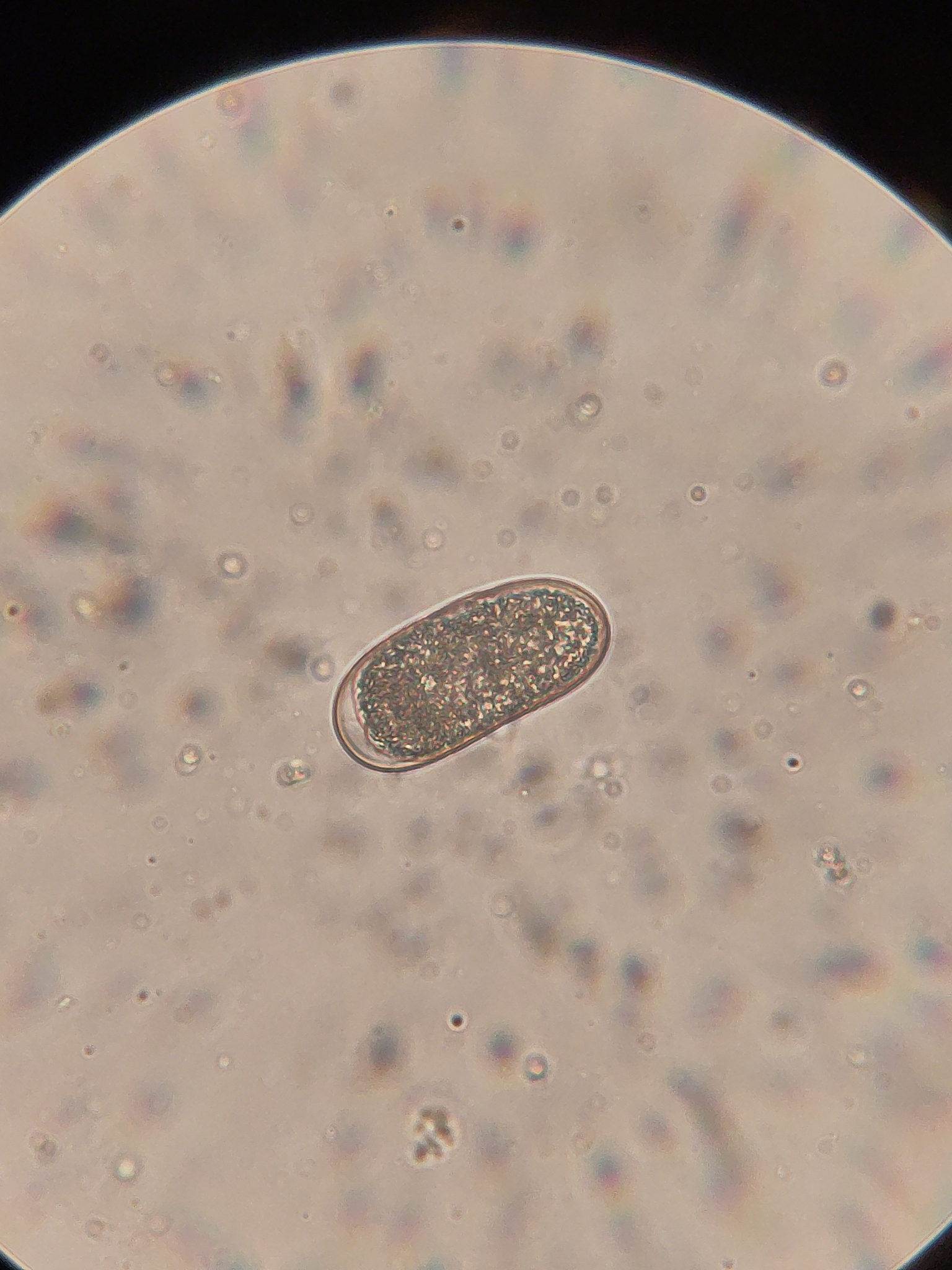
Subanguina graminophila egg under the microscope

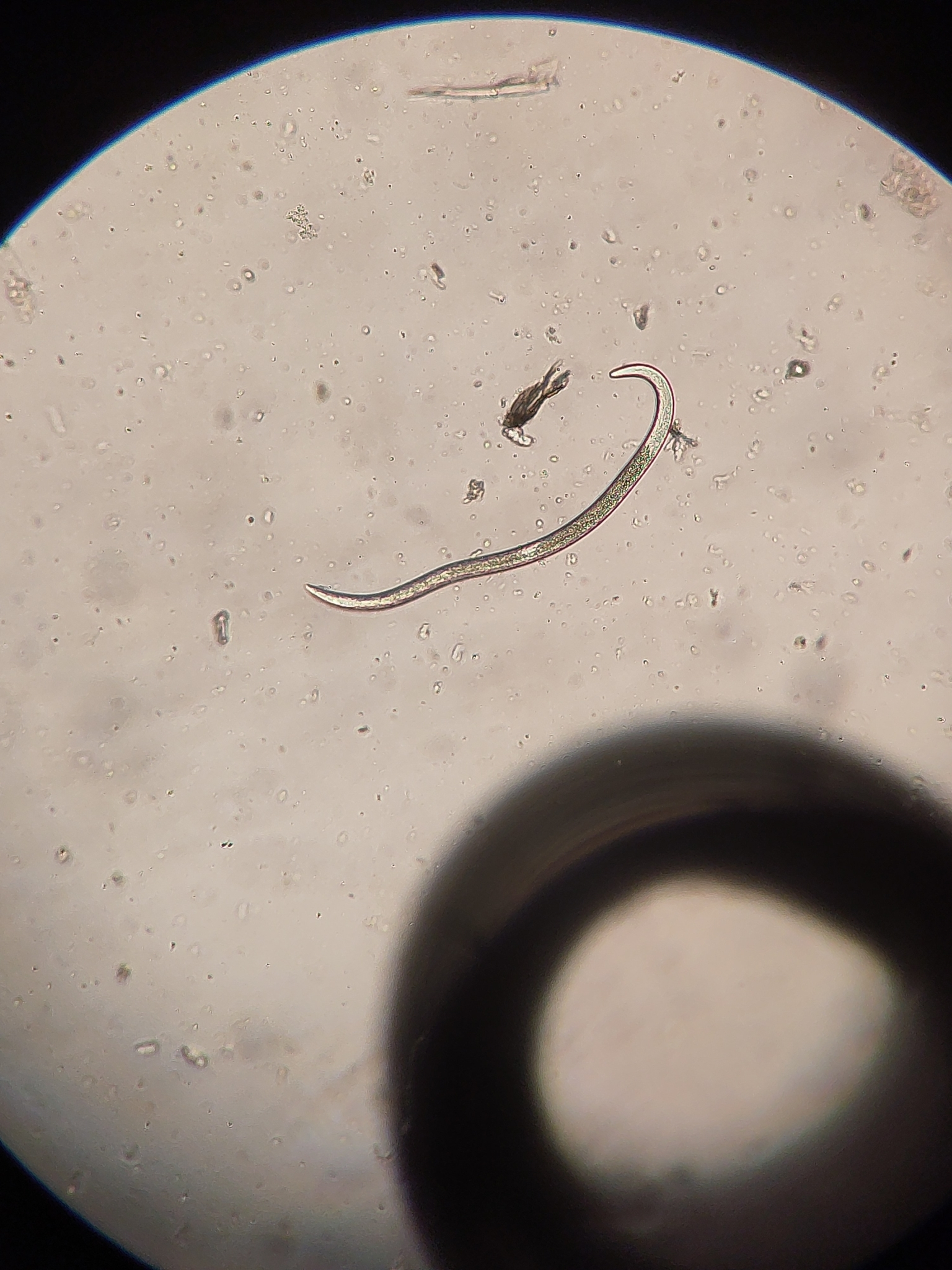
Juvenile Subanguina graminophila under the microscope
