= Anguina amsinckiae =

Fiddleneck flower gall nematode

Scientific classification
- Domain: Eukaryota
- Kingdom: Animalia
- Phylum: Nematoda
- Class: Secernentea
- Order: Tylenchida
- Family: Anguinidae
- Genus: Anguina
- Species: A. amsinckiae

Binomial name
- Anguina amsinckiae (Steiner & Scott, 1935) Thorne, 1961

Synonyms
- Anguillulina dipsaci var. amsinckiae Ditylenchus dipsaci var. amsinckiae

Species of roundworm

Anguina amsinckiae (Fiddleneck flower gall nematode) is a plant pathogenic nematode, which attacks the weed called fiddleneck.
