= Subanguina wevelli =

Scientific classification
- Domain: Eukaryota
- Kingdom: Animalia
- Phylum: Nematoda
- Class: Secernentea
- Order: Tylenchida
- Family: Anguinidae
- Genus: Subanguina
- Species: S. wevelli

Binomial name
- Subanguina wevelli (Van den Berg, 1985) Ebsary, 1991

Species of roundworm

Subanguina wevelli (seed-gall nematode; syn. Afrina wevelli Van den Berg, 1985) is a plant pathogenic nematode and an invasive species.
