= Anguina =

Anguina may refer to:

- Anguina (nematode), genus in the family Anguinidae
- Anguina, a synonym of the plant genus Trichosanthes
