= P. minutus =

P. minutus may refer to:

- Pelasgus minutus, a ray-finned fish species found only in Albania
- Phrynobatrachus minutus, a frog species found in Ethiopia, Kenya, Tanzania and Uganda
- Paratylenchus minutus, a plant pathogenic nematode species
- Pseudotropheus minutus, a fish species endemic to Malawi

== See also ==
- List of Latin and Greek words commonly used in systematic names#M
