= T. maximus =

T. maximus may refer to:

- Thalasseus maximus, the royal tern, a seabird species that breeds on the Atlantic and Pacific coasts of the southern USA and Mexico into the Caribbean
- Tylenchorhynchus maximus, a plant pathogenic nematode species

== See also ==
- Maximus (disambiguation)
