= Subanguina radicicola =

Scientific classification
- Kingdom: Animalia
- Phylum: Nematoda
- Class: Secernentea
- Order: Tylenchida
- Family: Anguinidae
- Genus: Subanguina
- Species: S. radicicola

Binomial name
- Subanguina radicicola (Greeff, 1872)

Synonyms
- Anguillula radicicola

Species of roundworm

Subanguina radicicola, the grass root-gall nematode, is a plant pathogenic nematode.
