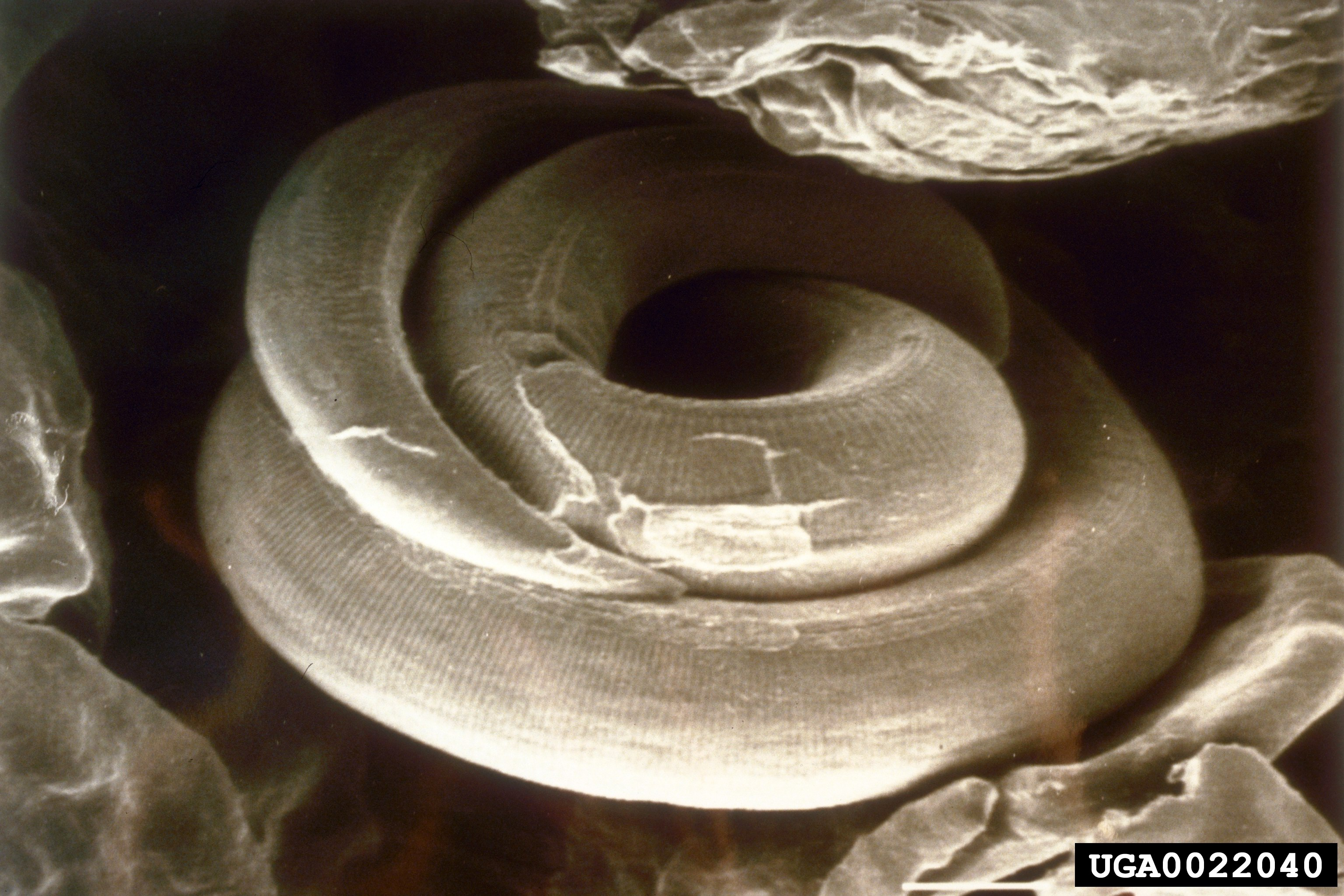
- Subanguina picridis

Scientific classification
- Domain: Eukaryota
- Kingdom: Animalia
- Phylum: Nematoda
- Class: Secernentea
- Order: Tylenchida
- Family: Anguinidae
- Genus: Subanguina; Paramonov (1967)

Type species
- Subanguina radicicola (Greeff, 1872) Paramonov, 1967

Species
- See text

Synonyms
- Heteroanguina (Chizhov, 1980); Afrina (Brzeski, 1981); Mesoanguina (Chizhov & Subbotin, 1985)

= Root gall nematode =

Genus of roundworms

Root-gall nematodes are plant-parasitic nematodes from the genus Subanguina that affect grasses, including cereals, and some other plants, such as mugwort. They are distinct from the Root-knot nematodes which are from the genus Meloidogyne. So far around twenty-five separate species of Subanguina have been identified, although the most well-known and type species is Subanguina radicicola.

== Species ==
In addition to the type species:

- Subanguina radicicola (Greeff, 1872) Paramonov, 1967 (Grass root-gall nematode)

Other recognized species of Subanguina include:

- Subanguina askenasyi (Butschli, 1873) Brzeski, 1981
- Subanguina brenani (Goodey, 1945) Brzeski, 1981
- Subanguina calamagrostis (Wu, 1967) Brzeski, 1981
- Subanguina centaureae (Kirjanova, & Ivanova, 1969) Brzeski, 1981
- Subanguina chartolepidis (Poghossian, 1966) Brzeski, 1981
- Subanguina chrysopogoni Bajaj, Dabur, Paruthi & Bhatti, 1990
- Subanguina cousinae (Kirjanova & Ivanova, 1969) Brzeski, 1981
- Subanguina ferulae (Ivanova, 1977) Brzeski, 1981 [p. 1484]
- Subanguina graminophila (Goodey, 1933) Brzeski, 1981
- Subanguina guizotiae (van den Berg, 1985) Ebsary, 1991
- Subanguina hyparrheniae (Corbett, 1966) Fortuner & Maggenti, 1987
- Subanguina kopetdaghica (Kirjanova & Shagalina, 1969) Brzeski, 1981
- Subanguina millefolii (Low, 1874) Brzeski, 1981
- Subanguina mobilis (Chit & Fisher, 1975) Brzeski, 1981
- Subanguina montana (Kirjanova & Ivanova, 1969) Brzeski, 1981
- Subanguina moxae (Yokoo and Choi, 1968) Brzeski, 1981
- Subanguina pharangii (Chizhov, 1984) Siddiqi, 1986
- Subanguina picridis (Kirjanova, 1944) Brzeski, 1981
- Subanguina plataginis (Hirschmann, 1977) Brzeski, 1981
- Subanguina polygoni (Poghossian, 1966) Brzeski, 1981
- Subanguina spermophaga (Steiner, 1937) Siddiqi, 1986
- Subanguina tridomina (Kirjanova, 1958) (syn. Anguillulina graminophila)
- Subanguina tumefaciens (Cobb, 1932) Fortuner & Maggenti, 1987
- Subanguina varosobica (Kirjanova & Ivanova, 1969) Brzeski, 1981
- Subanguina wevelli (van den Berg, 1985) Ebsary, 1991 (Seed-gall nematode, syn. Afrina wevelli)

== See also ==
- Root nodule
