= Anguina balsamophila =

Scientific classification
- Domain: Eukaryota
- Kingdom: Animalia
- Phylum: Nematoda
- Class: Secernentea
- Order: Tylenchida
- Family: Anguinidae
- Genus: Anguina
- Species: A. balsamophila

Binomial name
- Anguina balsamophila (Thorne, 1926) Filipjev, 1936

Species of roundworm

Anguina balsamophila is a plant pathogenic nematode in mules ear (Wyethia mollis).
