= Paratylenchus tenuicaudatus =

Scientific classification
- Domain: Eukaryota
- Kingdom: Animalia
- Phylum: Nematoda
- Class: Secernentea
- Order: Tylenchida
- Family: Tylenchulidae
- Genus: Paratylenchus
- Species: P. tenuicaudatus

Binomial name
- Paratylenchus tenuicaudatus Wu, 1961

Species of roundworm

Paratylenchus tenuicaudatus is a plant pathogenic nematode infecting soybeans.

This species has characters close to Paratylenchus hamatus, P. elachistus, and P. nanus, but differs from these species in having a long slender tail, in having the vulva in a more forward position, in having a more massive basal bulb of the esophagus, and in the fact that it is a considerably larger species.
