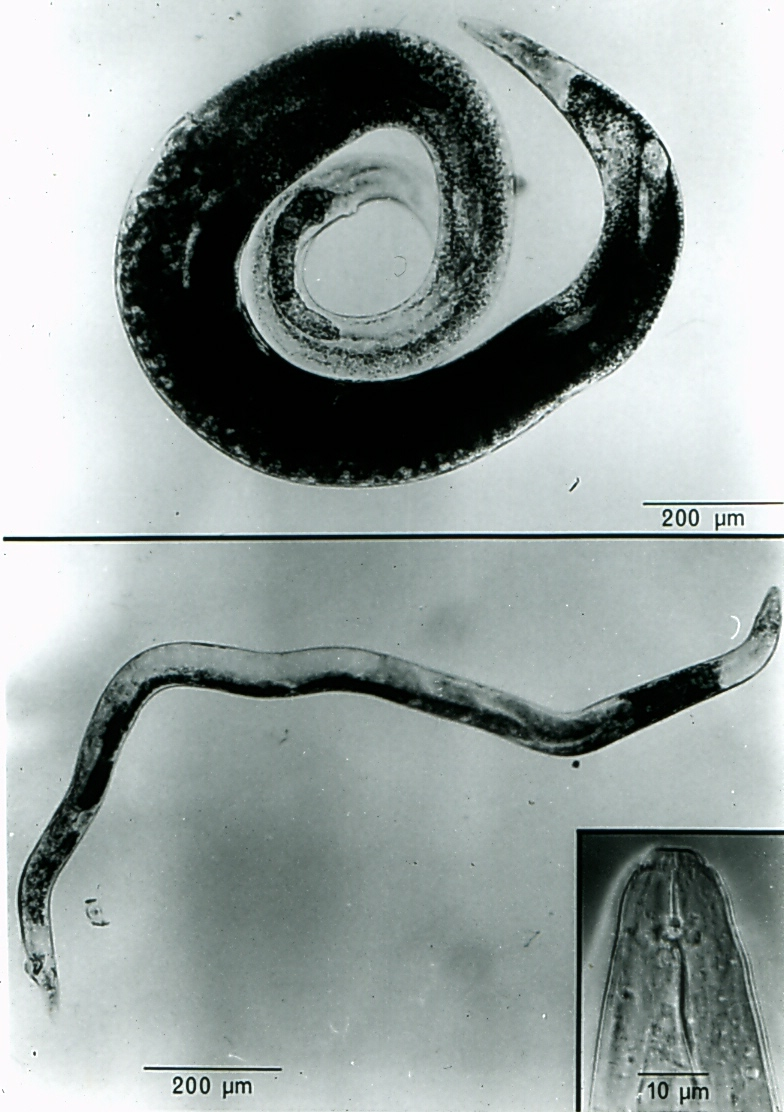

Scientific classification
- Kingdom: Animalia
- Phylum: Nematoda
- Class: Secernentea
- Order: Tylenchida
- Family: Anguinidae
- Genus: Anguina
- Species: A. agrostis

Binomial name
- Anguina agrostis (Steinbuch, 1799) Filipjev, 1936

Synonyms
- Anguillula agrostidis (Bastian) Warming, 1877; Anguillula agrostis (Steinbuch) Ehrenberg, 1838; Anguillula phalaridis (Steinbuch) Ehrenberg, 1838; Anguillulina agrostis (Steinbuch) Goodey, 1932; Anguillulina phalaridis (Steinbuch) Goodey, 1932; Anguina lolii Price, 1973 (=nomen nudum); Anguina phalaridis (Steinbuch) Chizhov, 1980; Anguina poophila Kirjanova, 1952; Tylenchus agrostidis Bastian, 1865; Tylenchus agrostis (Steinbuch) Goodey, 1930; Tylenchus phalaridis (Steinbuch) Orley, 1880; Tylenchus phlei Horn, 1888; Vibrio agrostis Steinbuch, 1799; Vibrio phalaridis (Steinbuch) Ehrenberg, 1838

= Anguina agrostis =

Bentgrass nematode

Species of roundworm

Anguina agrostis (Bentgrass nematode, seed-gall nematode) is a plant pathogenic nematode.

== History and significance ==
Anguina agrostis was one of the first plant parasitic nematodes to be taxonomically described by J.G. Steinbuch in 1799. While on a "botanical walk", Steinbuch collected samples from a grass that resembled Agrostis silvatica. He examined the samples and discovered that the grass was not A. silvatica but was rather a degenerate form of Agrostis capillaris; he further discovered that A. silvatica is not a true species (or variety) but that the misclassification of the grass was due to the formation of galls by A. agrostis parasitism. Galls caused by A. agrostis have glumes that are 4-5 times longer than normal and can cause yield losses of up to 40-70%. In addition to crop loss, A. agrostis associates with pathogenic bacteria Rathayibacter rathayi (formerly Corynebacterium rathayi) to cause annual ryegrass toxicity in Australia.

== Hosts and distribution ==
A. agrostis infects bentgrasses within the genus Agrostis as well as annual and perennial ryegrasses (Lolium spp.). The nematode can also infect 14 other genera of grasses. A. agrostis has been found in Australia, New Zealand, Western Europe, former USSR, Canada, and the United States.

== Morphology ==
The lip region is slightly offset (3-4 μm high) and the nematode has a very short stylet (10 μm). A. agrostis has a three-part esophagus. The procorpus is cylindrical with a swelling near its midsection. The metacorpus is ovoid in shape and the isthmus is long and narrow. The postcorpus has three glands and is highly developed, but does not overlap the intestine. On average, infective juveniles (J2) measure 530 μm and dauer juveniles measure 760 μm; the increase in size is due to feeding and the formation of lipid droplets or storage bodies. Females range from 1.5 to 2.7 mm in length, are curved ventrally, and are swollen. The vulva is located near the posterior end and one ovary is present. Males are smaller (1.1-1.7 mm in length), are not as swollen, and have a small bursae that extends subterminally. One testis is present.

== Life cycle and reproduction ==
Infective second stage juveniles (J2) find a young host, migrate to areas of new growth and are carried up with the growing point of the plant. They may feed ectoparasitically until formation of the inflorescence, at which time the J2 invades the ovule, becomes sedentary, and a gall begins to form. Within the gall, nematodes progress through three molts to reach adulthood (J3, J4, male and female adults). Reproduction is amphimictic and females can lay up to 1000 eggs. The first molt occurs in the egg and the nematode hatches as a J2. These juveniles undergo anhydrobiosis and become the dormant dauer larvae to withstand the hot summer heat of Australia. Autumn rains rehydrate the dauer juveniles which become active to begin the life cycle over again. Only one generation is produced per year.

== Host-parasite relationship ==
Infective second stage juveniles colonize plants during the vegetative growth stage and may feed ectoparasitically during this time. When the inflorescence begins to form, the J2s invade the flower ovule and begin to feed endoparasitically. Nematode feeding on floret primordia induces rapid cell division, cell enlargement, and subsequent cell degeneration and collapse. The continuation of this process results in the formation of a large central cavity (in which the now-sedentary nematodes reside) enveloped by a gall wall. Gall size increases rapidly as nematodes grow and reproduce. The gall wall is several cell layers thick. Inner cells of the gall wall (near the cavity) have dense cytoplasm with several mitochondria, indicating high levels of metabolic activity. These cells most likely provide nutrients to the nematodes. The outer layers of the gall wall are unmodified, thereby forming and maintaining the gall structure. As the plant senesces, the galls desiccate and the nematodes undergo anhydrobiosis.

== Management ==
To mitigate the effects of annual ryegrass toxicity, farmers can move their livestock another, uninfected pasture at first sign of toxicity. Hot water treatments or chemical seed treatments have been used to produce clean seed. Infected pastures can be managed by mowing, herbicide treatments, or burning. These techniques eliminate the development of inflorescences and halt the life cycle of the nematode since they only mature to adulthood within the seed gall. A. agrostis cannot survive in the soil for more than one year and thus practices such as crop rotation or fallow have proven to be effective in managing the nematode.
