= Paratylenchus projectus =

Scientific classification
- Domain: Eukaryota
- Kingdom: Animalia
- Phylum: Nematoda
- Class: Secernentea
- Order: Tylenchida
- Family: Tylenchulidae
- Genus: Paratylenchus
- Species: P. projectus

Binomial name
- Paratylenchus projectus Jenkins, 1956

Species of worm

Paratylenchus projectus is a plant pathogenic nematode infecting several hosts including African violet, soybean, and sunflower.
