= Paratylenchus minutus =

Scientific classification
- Kingdom: Animalia
- Phylum: Nematoda
- Class: Secernentea
- Order: Tylenchida
- Family: Tylenchulidae
- Genus: Paratylenchus
- Species: P. minutus

Binomial name
- Paratylenchus minutus Linford, Oliveira & Ishii, 1949

Synonyms
- Paratylenchus shenzhenensis

Species of roundworm

Paratylenchus minutus is a plant pathogenic nematode infecting pineapples. It's very small only being 0.24–0.31 mm long. It is found in Hawaii, Florida, and China.
