= Quinisulcius =

Scientific classification
- Domain: Eukaryota
- Kingdom: Animalia
- Phylum: Nematoda
- Class: Secernentea
- Order: Tylenchida
- Family: Belonolaimidae
- Genus: Quinisulcius; Siddiqi, 1971

Genus of roundworms

Quinisulcius is a genus of nematodes belonging to the family Belonolaimidae.

The genus has almost cosmopolitan distribution.

Species:

- Quinisulcius acutoides (Thorne & Malek, 1968) Siddiqi, 1971
- Quinisulcius acutus (Allen, 1955) Siddiqi, 1971
- Quinisulcius brevistyletus Kulinich, 1985
- Quinisulcius cacti (Chawla, Bhamburkar, Khan & Prasad, 1968) Siddiqi, 1971
- Quinisulcius capitatus (Allen, 1955) Siddiqi, 1971
- Quinisulcius curvus (Williams, 1960) Siddiqi, 1971
- Quinisulcius curvus Williams, 1960
- Quinisulcius dalatensis (Nguyen & Nguyen, 1998) Geraert, 2011
- Quinisulcius domesticus Sultan, Singh & Sakhuja, 1995
- Quinisulcius gumdariensis Khan & Singh, 1999
- Quinisulcius indicus Luqman & Khan, 1986
- Quinisulcius lineatus Karapetjan, 1979
- Quinisulcius obregonus Knobloch & Laughlin, 1973
- Quinisulcius punici Gupta & Uma, 1980
- Quinisulcius quaidi Zarina & Maqbool, 1992
- Quinisulcius rotundicephalus Shaw & Khan, 1997
- Quinisulcius seshadrii Giribabu & Saha, 2002
- Quinisulcius tarjani Knobloch, 1975
