= Paratylenchus macrophallus =

Scientific classification
- Kingdom: Animalia
- Phylum: Nematoda
- Class: Secernentea
- Order: Tylenchida
- Family: Tylenchulidae
- Genus: Paratylenchus
- Species: P. macrophallus

Binomial name
- Paratylenchus macrophallus (de Man, 1880)

Species of nematode worm

Paratylenchus macrophallus is a plant pathogenic nematode infecting mint.
