= Tylenchorhynchus dubius =

Scientific classification
- Domain: Eukaryota
- Kingdom: Animalia
- Phylum: Nematoda
- Class: Secernentea
- Order: Tylenchida
- Family: Belonolaimidae
- Genus: Tylenchorhynchus
- Species: T. dubius

Binomial name
- Tylenchorhynchus dubius (Buetschli, 1873) Filipjev, (1936)

Synonyms
- Tylenchus dubius Tylenchus (Bitylenchus) dubius Anguillulina dubia Tylenchorhynchus dubius Tylenchorhynchus cylindricus

Species of worm

Tylenchorhynchus dubius is a plant pathogenic nematode.
