= Scaptomyza wheeleri =

Scientific classification
- Domain: Eukaryota
- Kingdom: Animalia
- Phylum: Arthropoda
- Class: Insecta
- Order: Diptera
- Family: Drosophilidae
- Genus: Scaptomyza
- Species: S. wheeleri

Binomial name
- Scaptomyza wheeleri Hackman, 1959

Species of fly

Scaptomyza wheeleri is a species of fruit fly in the family Drosophilidae.
