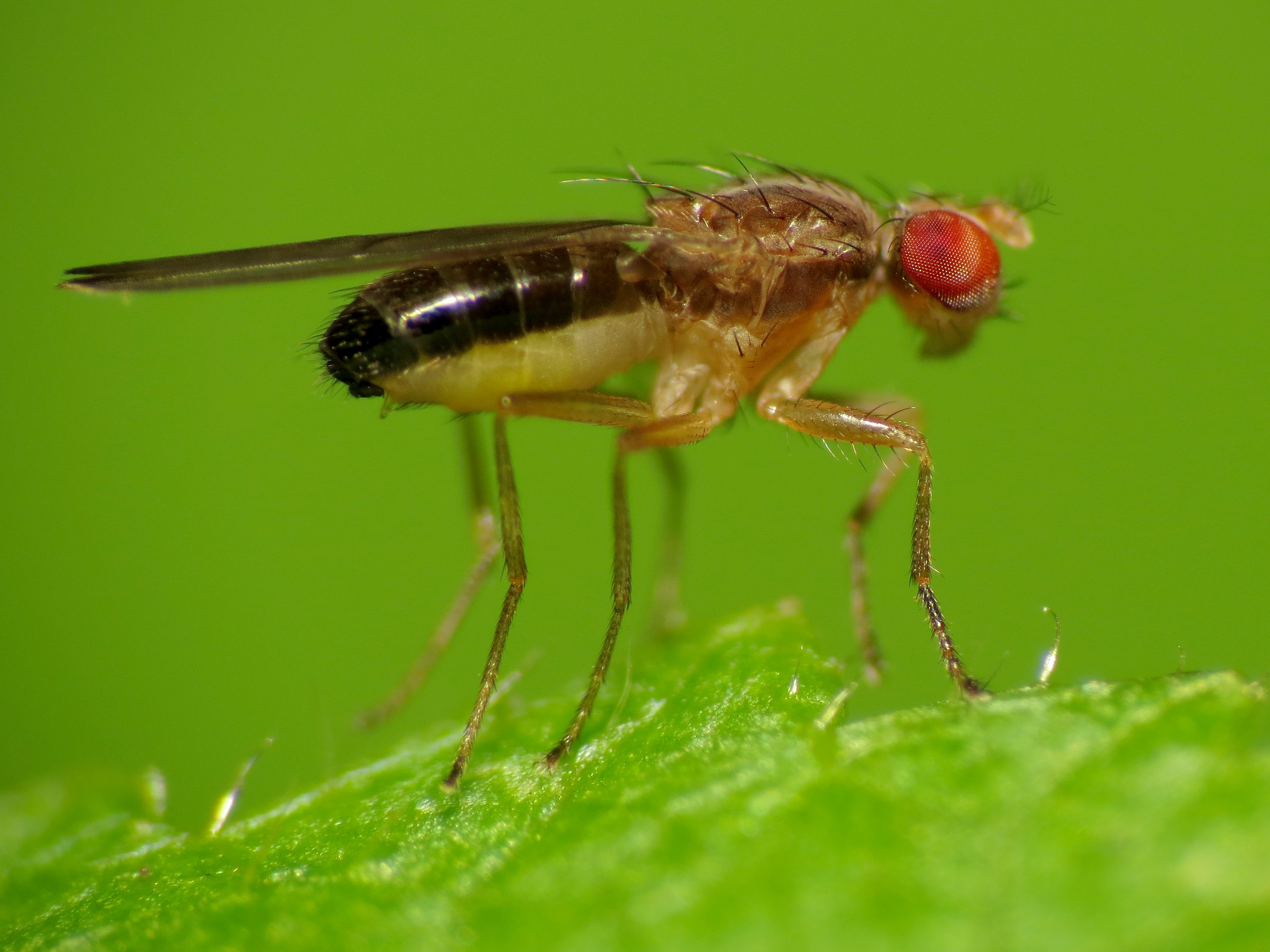

Scientific classification
- Domain: Eukaryota
- Kingdom: Animalia
- Phylum: Arthropoda
- Class: Insecta
- Order: Diptera
- Family: Drosophilidae
- Genus: Scaptomyza
- Species: S. adusta

Binomial name
- Scaptomyza adusta (Loew, 1862)

Synonyms
- Drosophila adusta Loew, 1862

= Scaptomyza adusta =

Species of fly

Scaptomyza adusta is a species of fruit fly in the family Drosophilidae. It is found in Europe.
