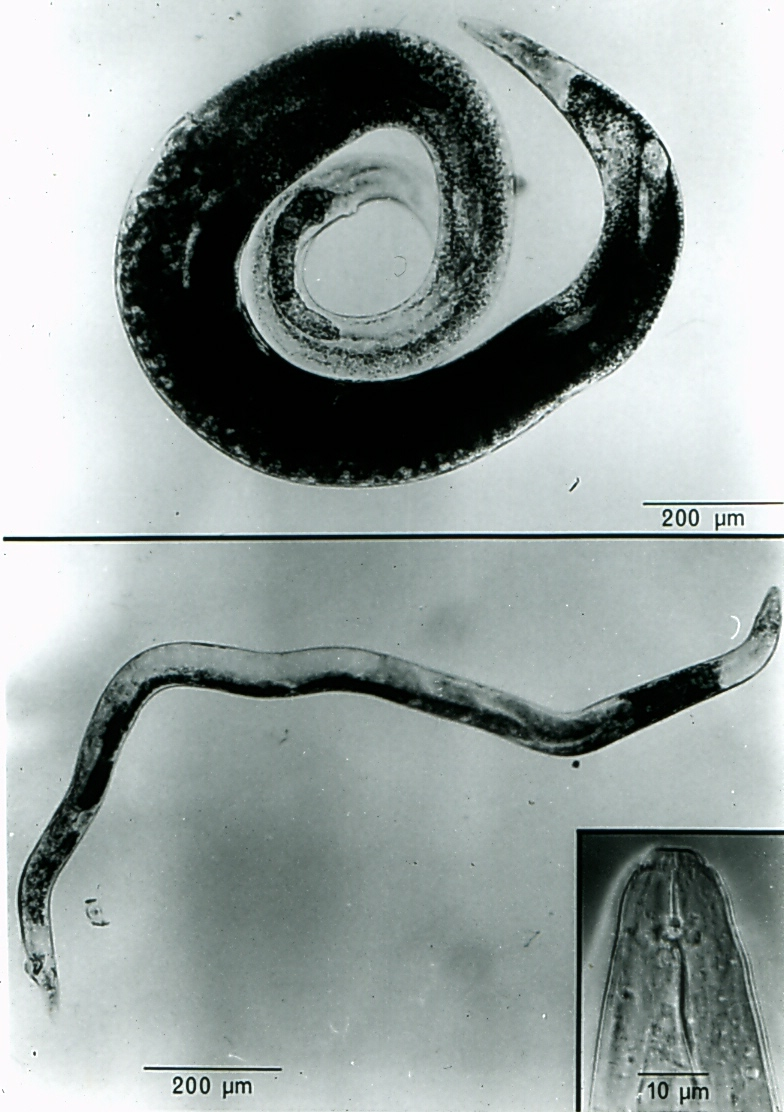
- Anguina agrostis

Scientific classification
- Kingdom: Animalia
- Phylum: Nematoda
- Class: Secernentea
- Order: Tylenchida
- Family: Anguinidae
- Genus: Anguina; Scopoli, 1773

Species
- See text

= Anguina (nematode) =

Genus of roundworms

Anguina (seed-gall nematode, seed and leaf gall nematode, seed gall nematode, shoot gall nematode) is a genus of plant pathogenic nematodes.

== Species ==
In addition to the type species:

- Anguina tritici (Steinbuch, 1799) Filipjev, 1936

species include:

- Anguina agropyri Kirjanova, 1955
- Anguina agropyronifloris Norton, 1965
- Anguina agrostis (Steinbuch, 1799) Filipjev, 1936
- Anguina amsinckiae (Steiner & Scott, 1935) Thorne, 1961
- Anguina australis Steiner, 1940
- Anguina balsamophila (Thorne, 1926) Filipjev, 1936
- Anguina caricis Solovyeva & Krall, 1982
- Anguina cecidoplastes (Goodey, 1934) filipjev, 1936
- Anguina funesta Price, Fisher & Kerr, 1979
- Anguina graminis (Hardy, 1850) Filipjev, 1936
- Anguina microlaenae (Fawcett, 1938) Steiner, 1940
- Anguina pacificae Cid del Prado Vera & Maggenti, 1984
- Anguina spermophaga Steiner, 1937

Former species

- Anguina lolii Price, 1973 now a syn. Anguina agrostis
- Anguina millefolii now Subanguina millefolii (Low, 1874) Brzeski, 1981
- Anguina phalaridis (Steinbuch) Chizhov, 1980 now a syn. Anguina agrostis
- Anguina poophila Kirjanova, 1952, now a syn. Anguina agrostis
- Anguina tumefaciens now Subanguina tumefaciens (Cobb, 1932) Fortuner & Maggenti, 1987
