= Tylenchorhynchus =

Scientific classification
- Kingdom: Animalia
- Phylum: Nematoda
- Class: Secernentea
- Order: Tylenchida
- Family: Belonolaimidae
- Genus: Tylenchorhynchus; Cobb, 1913

Genus of roundworms

Tylenchorhynchus is a genus of nematodes including many species of plant parasites. The classification of stunt nematodes - those including the genus Tylenchorhynchus - is unstable; many newly discovered species within this genus are reconsidered to be actually subspecies. Stunt nematodes such as Tylenchorhynchus and the closely related genera, Anguillulina and Merlinia, include more than 250 known species. Members of these genera possess similar anatomy and may be easily mistaken for one another. Some debate has led to the classification of single species under different names in two distinct genera (e.g. Tylenchorhynchus cylindricus is Anguillulina dubia).

== List of species ==
- Tylenchorhynchus brevilineatus
- Tylenchorhynchus claytoni – the tobacco stunt nematode
- Tylenchorhynchus cobb
- Tylenchorhynchus contractus
- Tylenchorhynchus cylindricus
- Tylenchorhynchus dubius
- Tylenchorhynchus magnicoda
- Tylenchorhynchus maximus
- Tylenchorhynchus nudus
- Tylenchorhynchus phaseoli
- Tylenchorhynchus vulgaris
- Tylenchorhynchus zeae

== Agricultural diseases ==
Tylenchorhynchus are soil dwelling stunt nematodes. They inhabit the same soil as plant root systems in which they can cause stressing or disease in plants. About 8% of the studied species are parasitic. Agricultural problems associated with Tylenchorhynchus spp. affect many species such as soybean, tobacco, tea, oat, alfalfa, sweet potato, sorghum, rose, lettuce, grape, elms, and citrus.
