= James Hardy (naturalist) =

Scottish naturalist and antiquarian

James Hardy LL.D.
- Born: 1 June 1815; Oldhamstocks, East Lothian, Scotland
- Died: 30 September 1898 (aged 83); Old Cambus, Cockburnspath, Berwickshire, Scotland
- Burial place: Coldingham Abbey, Berwickshire
- Occupations: Naturalist, antiquarian
- Years active: 1839-1893 and after

James Hardy LL.D. (1 June 1815 – 30 September 1898) was a Scottish naturalist and antiquarian. He was secretary of the Berwickshire Naturalists' Club from 1871 until at least 1896. At least two species have been named in his honour.

== Biography ==
Hardy was the eldest son of George Hardie (c. 1781-1783 – after 1861) and his wife Elizabeth (c. 1793 – after 1851). At an unknown date, the family relocated from Oldhamstocks, East Lothian to Penmanshiel Farm, Cockburnspath, Berwickshire, where they were well-respected tenant farmers. James is known in official records as "James Hardie" (such as the 1851 Census, which describes him as "Of Penmanshiel Farmhouse, Age 35, Unmarried, Naturalist Writes on Natural History In press", and the 1861 Census, which too locates him at Penmanshiel); but he seems to have preferred the alternative spelling, "Hardy", of his surname. According to the Ordnance Survey Name Books for Berwickshire of 1856-58, Penmanshiel was a "well built and commodious farm house two storys [sic] high, having suitable offices. There are also a vegetable garden and a large farm attached. It is occupied by Mr Hardie and is the property of Sir John Hall Bart. Dunglass." That was written by "Mr James Hardy", presumably the subject of this article; "Mr Hardie" was presumably his father, George Hardie.

Hardy was educated at a local village school or schools. In about 1833, he entered the University of Edinburgh, where he studied for four sessions (including one spent at Glasgow, to attend a special class). It seems that his health was never good, and that (despite having been a good student) he was for one reason or another unsuited for a profession. He returned home, where he remained for some years, although he continued to study. From 1840 or 1846, he taught at an academy in Gateshead, on Tyneside, for some years; but his health again gave way. He returned to Berwickshire, and remained there for the rest of his life.

In 1839, he had had one scientific paper published in the Proceedings of the Berwickshire Naturalists' Club. From 1846, a previously unremarkable career began to blossom. During his time on Tyneside, he had joined the Literary and Philosophical Society of Newcastle, the Newcastle Antiquarian Society, and the Tyneside Naturalists' Field Club (founded 1846; he was one of its earliest members); and had become acquainted with many of the foremost men of science in north-east England. He subsequently became a prolific writer about, and an authority on, the natural history and folklore of Berwickshire and the Scottish Borders. Sir William Hooker, a co-founder (in 1839) of the Berwickshire Naturalists' Club, introduced Hardy to Dr George Johnston, of Berwick-on-Tweed, and those two became close friends. Hardy began to submit to learned journals papers which were accepted and published. In 1848, he and his friend T. J. Bold published a set of three papers in Transactions of the Tyneside Naturalists' Field Club on the insects of Northumberland and Durham; which, although it only extended to Coleoptera, included 353 genera and 1170 species. His obituary called it "marvellously exhaustive".

He did not formally join the Berwickshire Naturalists' Club until 1863; but in 1871 was appointed its co-secretary, with Dr Francis Douglas; and after the death of Douglas in 1886, served as sole secretary until 1896, when he was joined in that office by the Rev. George Gunn.

In 1878, he was recorded as a farmer at Penmanshiel; but it seems that by 1886 he had retired to Old Cambus, and that his younger brother Arthur was managing Penmanshiel Farm.

In 1881, in recognition of his voluntary services, the Berwickshire Naturalists' Club presented him with an inscribed microscope, and a cheque for £111 (equivalent as of 2017 to about £12,700) towards the binding of his collection of books, pamphlets and manuscripts. In April 1890, the University of Edinburgh conferred upon him the degree of LL.D. honoris causa, a high distinction. Two months later, the club not only acclaimed it, but presented him with a handsomely illuminated address and a cheque for £400 (equivalent as of 2017 to about £48,400).

In 1877, Hardy and a Miss Ann Halliday (they were distant relatives) of Wooler, Northumberland, had married. They had no children. It was Hardy's habit to inspect his flower garden after tea-time every day when weather permitted. On 30 September 1898, his wife, perturbed by his unusual lateness to return, discovered his lifeless body there. He was interred at Coldingham Abbey, Berwickshire; where he is commemorated in a stained-glass window.

== Taxa described ==
- Vibrio graminis, the nematode worm Anguina graminis (1850).
- Cecidomyia helianthemi, a gall midge Dasineura helianthemi

== Acknowledgments and recognition ==
=== Taxa named in honour ===
According to Hardy's obituarist, "several of his discoveries, still bearing the specific name of Hardyii [capital "H" in the source] will serve to keep for ever green the memory of one we loved so well". These include:

- Calyptostoma hardii (Cambridge, 1875) = C. hardyi, a mite in genus Calyptostoma. (In 1976, Vistorin-Theis proposed that this was the same species as C. velutinus (Müller, 1776). Not all authors have agreed with the identity.)
- Walckenaer(i)a hardii (Blackwall, 1850) = Leptothrix hardyi, a spider.

=== Other acknowledgments and recognition ===
In 1850, William King acknowledged Hardy's contributions to his book on the Permian fossils of England. In 1853, entomologist Andrew Murray acknowledged multiple contributions by Hardy to his Catalogue of the Coleoptera of Scotland. In 1879, William Henderson acknowledged Hardy's contributions to his Notes on the Folk-Lore of the Northern Counties of England and the Borders. In 1895, ornithologist George Muirhead acknowledged multiple contributions by Hardy to his Birds of Berwickshire. In 1926, W. S. Crockett called him "the indefatigable historian of the Berwickshire Naturalists' Club". In 2009, Diarmid Finnegan called him one of the "many leading members of Scottish natural history societies".

== Publications ==
- Hardy, James (1839). "Contributions to the Flora of Berwickshire" (PDF). Proceedings of the Berwickshire Naturalists' Club. 1: 206–210.
- History of the Berwickshire Naturalists' Club. Vol. 1. 1834. pp. (1) Contributions to the Flora of Berwickshire, 206–210, (2) List of coleopterous Insects collected in the neighbourhood of Pease Bridge, 228–229. (The publication date of this book is uncertain. Its frontispiece says MDCCCXXXIV (1834), but it includes contributions dated at least as late as 1840.)
- Hardy, James (1846). "Legends of King Arthur and of Sewingshields". The Local Historian's Table Book of Remarkable Occurrences, Historical Facts, Traditions, Legendary and Descriptive Ballads; Legendary Division. Vol. II. J. R. Smith. pp. 37–46 – via University of Rochester.
- Hardy, James; Bold, T. J. (1848). "A Catalogue of the Insects of Northumberland and Durham". Transactions of the Tyneside Naturalists' Field Club. Vol. i, pp. 37-96; vol ii, pp. 21-97 and 164-287.
- Hardy, James (1850). "On the effects produced by some Insects, &c., upon Plants". The Annals and Magazine of Natural History: Including Zoology, Botany, and Geology. 6 (2nd series): 182–188.
- 1856-1858. Multiple contributions to the Ordnance Survey Name Books for Berwickshire, as an authority for place names in the parish of Cockburnspath.
- 1868. Plants new to Berwickshire, with notes on their history
- 1868. A moss flora of eastern Berwickshire.
- "Resources on Old Scottish Roads". oldroadsofscotland.com. Citing Journal of the Berwickshire Naturalists Club. (1) Hardy, James: 1873-1875, volume 7, pp. 223–225, "Extracts from the Session-Book of Hutton Parish, A.D. 1649-1677" (2) Hardy, James: 1882-1884, volume 10, p. 401, "Notes on Yarrow"
- Johnston, George; Barwell-Carter, Jane Johnston (21 November 2009) [1892]. Hardy, James (ed.). Selections from the Correspondence of Dr. George Johnston. Kessinger Publishing. ISBN 978-1120702654.
- Denham, Michael Aislabie (1892–93). Hardy, James (ed.). Denham Tracts. Folk Lore Society.
- Hardy LL.D., the late James (1900). The Session Book of Bunkle and Preston 1665-1690. Alnwick: Berwickshire Naturalists' Club – via archive.org.
- Hardy, James. "Popular History of the Cuckoo". Folk-Lore Record. Part ii. (Date undetermined.)
