= Paratylenchus microdorus =

Scientific classification
- Domain: Eukaryota
- Kingdom: Animalia
- Phylum: Nematoda
- Class: Secernentea
- Order: Tylenchida
- Family: Tylenchulidae
- Genus: Paratylenchus
- Species: P. microdorus

Binomial name
- Paratylenchus microdorus Andrássy, 1959

Species of nematode worm

Paratylenchus microdorus is a plant pathogenic nematode infecting mint.
