= Paratylenchus elachistus =

Scientific classification
- Kingdom: Animalia
- Phylum: Nematoda
- Class: Secernentea
- Order: Tylenchida
- Family: Tylenchulidae
- Genus: Paratylenchus
- Species: P. elachistus

Binomial name
- Paratylenchus elachistus Steiner, 1949

Species of worm

Paratylenchus elachistus is a plant pathogenic nematode infecting pineapples.
