= Paratylenchus curvitatus =

Scientific classification
- Kingdom: Animalia
- Phylum: Nematoda
- Class: Secernentea
- Order: Tylenchida
- Family: Tylenchulidae
- Genus: Paratylenchus
- Species: P. curvitatus

Binomial name
- Paratylenchus curvitatus Van der Linde, 1938

Species of roundworm

Paratylenchus curvitatus is a plant pathogenic nematode infecting tea.
