= Tylenchorhynchus claytoni =

Tobacco stunt nematode

Scientific classification
- Domain: Eukaryota
- Kingdom: Animalia
- Phylum: Nematoda
- Class: Secernentea
- Order: Tylenchida
- Family: Belonolaimidae
- Genus: Tylenchorhynchus
- Species: T. claytoni

Binomial name
- Tylenchorhynchus claytoni Steiner, (1937)

Species of roundworm

Tylenchorhynchus claytoni (Tobacco stunt nematode, tessellate stylet nematode) is a plant pathogenic nematode.
