= Tylenchorhynchus nudus =

Scientific classification
- Kingdom: Animalia
- Phylum: Nematoda
- Class: Secernentea
- Order: Tylenchida
- Family: Belonolaimidae
- Genus: Tylenchorhynchus
- Species: T. nudus

Binomial name
- Tylenchorhynchus nudus Allen, 1955

Species of nematode worm

Tylenchorhynchus nudus is pathogenic nematode stunting plant growth. It occurs in South Dakota and infects the roots of mainly grass species.

In bentgrass and Kentucky bluegrass it causes decreases in both root growth. In Kentucky bluegrass it also inhibits shoot growth, and growth is further inhibited under dry conditions. Tylenchorhynchus nudus appears to modulate the effects of the fungus Magnaporthe poae on plant roots.

Under laboratory conditions, T. nudus can increase eight-fold over the time of 4 months and appears to be minimally impacted by environmental conditions.
