= Anguina spermophaga =

Scientific classification
- Domain: Eukaryota
- Kingdom: Animalia
- Phylum: Nematoda
- Class: Secernentea
- Order: Tylenchida
- Family: Anguinidae
- Genus: Anguina
- Species: A. spermophaga

Binomial name
- Anguina spermophaga

Species of nematode worm

Anguina spermophaga is a plant pathogenic nematode, that attacks sugarcane (Saccharum officinarum).
