= Tylenchorhynchus vulgaris =

Scientific classification
- Kingdom: Animalia
- Phylum: Nematoda
- Class: Secernentea
- Order: Tylenchida
- Family: Belonolaimidae
- Genus: Tylenchorhynchus
- Species: T. vulgaris

Binomial name
- Tylenchorhynchus vulgaris Upadhyay, Swarup & Sethi, 1972

Species of nematode worm

Tylenchorhynchus vulgaris is a plant pathogenic nematode infecting pearl millet.
