= Tylenchorhynchus phaseoli =

Scientific classification
- Kingdom: Animalia
- Phylum: Nematoda
- Class: Secernentea
- Order: Tylenchida
- Family: Belonolaimidae
- Genus: Tylenchorhynchus
- Species: T. phaseoli

Binomial name
- Tylenchorhynchus phaseoli Sethi & Swarup, 1968

Species of nematode worm

Tylenchorhynchus phaseoli is a plant pathogenic nematode infecting pearl millet.
