= Tylenchorhynchus brevilineatus =

Scientific classification
- Domain: Eukaryota
- Kingdom: Animalia
- Phylum: Nematoda
- Class: Secernentea
- Order: Tylenchida
- Family: Belonolaimidae
- Genus: Tylenchorhynchus
- Species: T. brevilineatus

Binomial name
- Tylenchorhynchus brevilineatus Williams

Species of nematode

Tylenchorhynchus brevilineatus is a plant pathogenic nematode infecting peanut.
