= Anguina australis =

Scientific classification
- Domain: Eukaryota
- Kingdom: Animalia
- Phylum: Nematoda
- Class: Secernentea
- Order: Tylenchida
- Family: Anguinidae
- Genus: Anguina
- Species: A. australis

Binomial name
- Anguina australis Steiner, 1940

Species of roundworm

Anguina australis is a plant pathogenic nematode, who is a vector for Rathayibacter toxicus in Ehrharta longiflora.
