= Anguina graminis =

Fescue leaf gall nematode

Scientific classification
- Domain: Eukaryota
- Kingdom: Animalia
- Phylum: Nematoda
- Class: Secernentea
- Order: Tylenchida
- Family: Anguinidae
- Genus: Anguina
- Species: A. graminis

Binomial name
- Anguina graminis (Hardy, 1850) Filipjev, 1936

Species of roundworm

Anguina graminis, the fescue leaf gall nematode, is a plant pathogenic nematode.
