= Quinisulcius capitatus =

Scientific classification
- Kingdom: Animalia
- Phylum: Nematoda
- Class: Secernentea
- Order: Tylenchida
- Family: Belonolaimidae
- Genus: Quinisulcius
- Species: Q. capitatus

Binomial name
- Quinisulcius capitatus (Allen, 1955)

Synonyms
- Tylenchorhynchus capitatus

Species of roundworm

Quinisulcius capitatus is a plant pathogenic nematode infecting oats.

== See also ==
- List of oat diseases
