= Scaptomyza pallida =

Scientific classification
- Domain: Eukaryota
- Kingdom: Animalia
- Phylum: Arthropoda
- Class: Insecta
- Order: Diptera
- Family: Drosophilidae
- Genus: Scaptomyza
- Species: S. pallida

Binomial name
- Scaptomyza pallida (Zetterstedt, 1847)

Synonyms
- Drosophila pallida Zetterstedt, 1847

Species of fly

Scaptomyza pallida is a species of fruit fly in the family Drosophilidae. It is found in Europe.

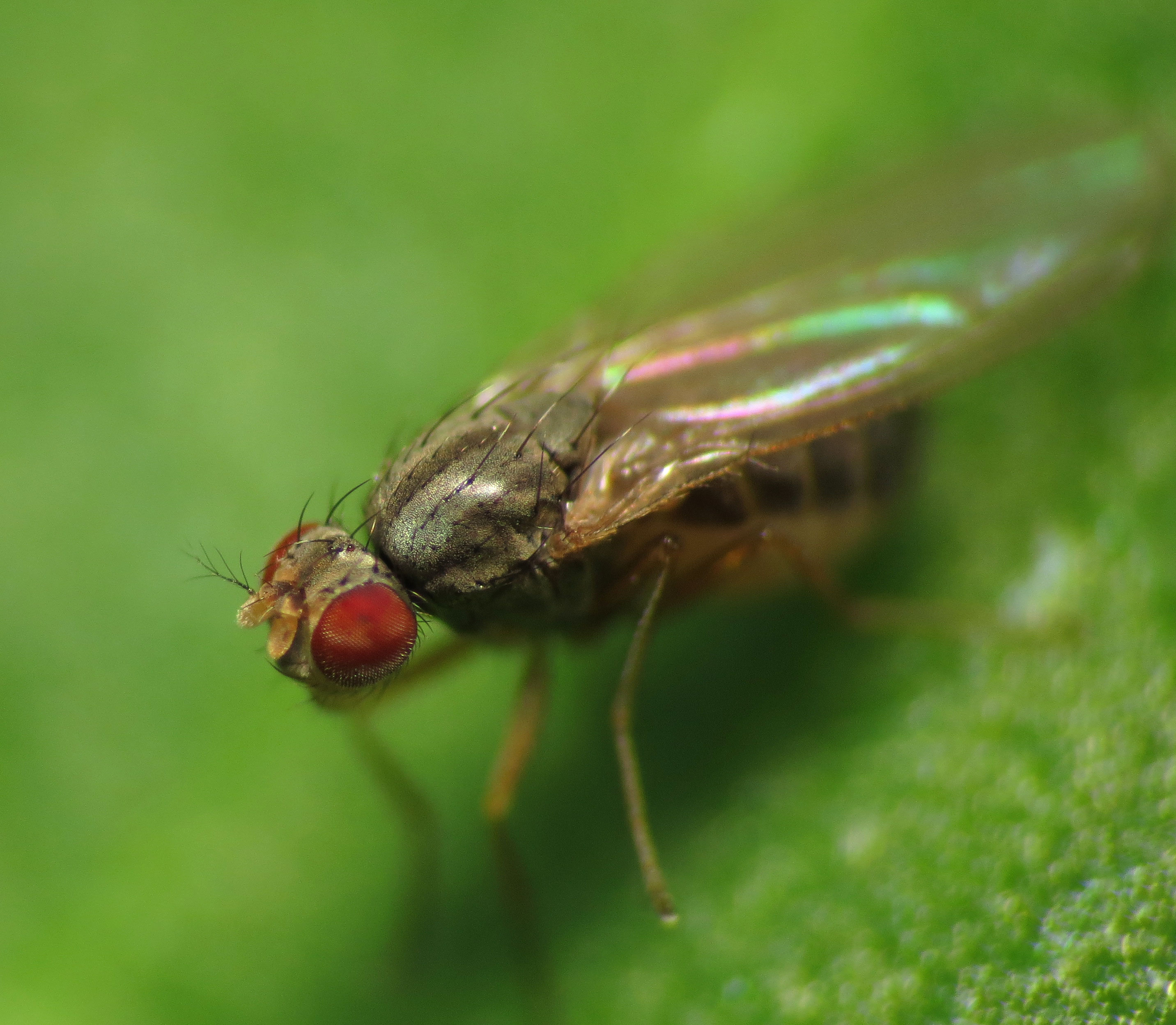
