= Hemicriconemoides =

Scientific classification
- Domain: Eukaryota
- Kingdom: Animalia
- Phylum: Nematoda
- Class: Secernentea
- Order: Tylenchida
- Family: Criconematidae
- Genus: Hemicriconemoides; Chitwood & Birchfield, 1957

Genus of worms

Hemicriconemoides is a genus of nematodes belonging to the family Criconematidae.

The genus has cosmopolitan distribution.

Species:

- Hemicriconemoides affinis Germani & Luc, 1970
- Hemicriconemoides alexis Vovlas, 1980
- Hemicriconemoides amurensis Eroshenko & Volkova, 1986
- Hemicriconemoides asymmetricus Rathour, Sharma, Singh & Ganguly, 2003
- Hemicriconemoides brachyuris (Loos, 1949)
- Hemicriconemoides brachyurus (Loos, 1949) Chitwood & Birchfield, 1957
- Hemicriconemoides brevicaudatus Dasgupta, Raski & Van Gundy, 1969
- Hemicriconemoides californianus Pinochet & Raski, 1975
- Hemicriconemoides camelliae Zhang, 1998
- Hemicriconemoides capensis Van den Berg, 1990
- Hemicriconemoides cedrusmontanus Van den Berg & Meyer, 1991
- Hemicriconemoides chitwoodi Esser, 1960
- Hemicriconemoides cocophillus (Loos, 1949) Chitwood & Birchfield, 1957
- Hemicriconemoides communis Edward & Misra, 1964
- Hemicriconemoides conicaudatus Phukan & Sanwal, 1983
- Hemicriconemoides digitatus Reay & Colbran, 1986
- Hemicriconemoides dipterocarpes Mohilal, Anandi & Dhanachand, 2004
- Hemicriconemoides doonensis Srivastava, Rawat & Ahmad, 2000
- Hemicriconemoides fujianensis Zhang, 1998
- Hemicriconemoides gabrici (Yeates, 1973) Raski, 1975
- Hemicriconemoides gaddi (Loos, 1949) Chitwood & Birchfield, 1957
- Hemicriconemoides ghaffari Maqbool, 1982
- Hemicriconemoides insignis Dasgupta, Raski & Van Gundy, 1969
- Hemicriconemoides kanayaensis Nakasono & Ichinohe, 1961
- Hemicriconemoides longistylus Rahman, 1990
- Hemicriconemoides macrodorus Vovlas, Troccoli & Castillo, 2000
- Hemicriconemoides magnificus Thanh & Chau, 2001
- Hemicriconemoides mangiferae Siddiqi, 1961
- Hemicriconemoides mehdii Suryawanshi, 1971
- Hemicriconemoides microdoratus Dasgupta, Raski & Van Gundy, 1969
- Hemicriconemoides minor Brzeski & Reay, 1982
- Hemicriconemoides minutus Esser, 1960
- Hemicriconemoides neobrachyurus Dhanachand & Jairajpuri, 1980
- Hemicriconemoides nitidus Pinochet & Raski, 1975
- Hemicriconemoides ortonwilliamsi Ye & Siddiqi, 1994
- Hemicriconemoides paracamelliae Maria, Cai, Castillo & Zheng, 2018
- Hemicriconemoides parasinensis Chen & Liu, 2003
- Hemicriconemoides parataiwanensis Decraemer & Geraert E., 1992
- Hemicriconemoides parvus Dasgupta, Raski & Van Gundy, 1969
- Hemicriconemoides phoenicis Azimi & Pedram, 2020
- Hemicriconemoides promissus Vovlas, 1980
- Hemicriconemoides pseudobrachyurus De Grisse, 1964
- Hemicriconemoides rosae Rathour, Sharma, Singh & Ganguly, 2003
- Hemicriconemoides rotundoides Gerlach, 2010
- Hemicriconemoides rotundus Ye & Siddiqi, 1994
- Hemicriconemoides scottolamassesei Germani & Anderson, 1991
- Hemicriconemoides silvaticus Eroshenko & Volkova, 1985
- Hemicriconemoides sinensis Vovlas, 1988
- Hemicriconemoides snoecki Doorsselaere & Samsoen, 1982
- Hemicriconemoides strictathecatus Esser, 1960
- Hemicriconemoides sunderbanensis Ganguly & Khan, 1982
- Hemicriconemoides taiwanensis Pinochet & Raski, 1975
- Hemicriconemoides variabilis Rahaman & Ahmad, 1995
- Hemicriconemoides varionodus Choi & Geraert, 1972
- Hemicriconemoides wessoni Chitwood & Birchfield, 1957
