= Paratylenchus =

Scientific classification
- Domain: Eukaryota
- Kingdom: Animalia
- Phylum: Nematoda
- Class: Secernentea
- Order: Tylenchida
- Family: Tylenchulidae
- Subfamily: Paratylenchinae
- Genus: Paratylenchus; Micoletzky, 1922

Species
- Paratylenchus curvitatus Paratylenchus elachistus Paratylenchus hamatus Paratylenchus macrophallus Paratylenchus microdorus Paratylenchus minutus Paratylenchus projectus Paratylenchus tenuicaudatus...

Synonyms
- Gracilacus Raski, 1962; Gracilipaurus Ganguly & Khan, 1990; Paratylenchoides Raski, 1973

Genus of roundworms

Paratylenchus is a genus of nematodes (round worms). Many of the species in this genus are plant pathogens.
