= Tylenchorhynchus zeae =

Scientific classification
- Kingdom: Animalia
- Phylum: Nematoda
- Class: Secernentea
- Order: Tylenchida
- Family: Belonolaimidae
- Genus: Tylenchorhynchus
- Species: T. zeae

Binomial name
- Tylenchorhynchus zeae Sethi & Swarup, 1968

Species of nematode worm

Tylenchorhynchus zeae is a plant pathogenic nematode infecting pearl millet.
