= Quinisulcius acutus =

Scientific classification
- Kingdom: Animalia
- Phylum: Nematoda
- Class: Secernentea
- Order: Tylenchida
- Family: Belonolaimidae
- Genus: Quinisulcius
- Species: Q. acutus

Binomial name
- Quinisulcius acutus (Allen 1955)

Synonyms
- Tylenchorhynchus acutus

Species of roundworm

Quinisulcius acutus is a plant pathogenic nematode infecting soybean and sunflower.

== See also ==
- List of soybean diseases
- List of sunflower diseases
