= Paratylenchus hamatus =

Fig pin nematode

Scientific classification
- Kingdom: Animalia
- Phylum: Nematoda
- Class: Chromadorea
- Order: Rhabditida
- Family: Tylenchulidae
- Genus: Paratylenchus
- Species: P. hamatus

Binomial name
- Paratylenchus hamatus Thorne and Allen, (1950)

Species of roundworm

Paratylenchus hamatus, the fig pin nematode, is a species of migratory plant endoparasites, that causes lesions on plant roots resulting in symptoms of chlorosis, wilting and ultimately yield losses. They move and feed on different parts of host tissue throughout their life cycle in order to find enough susceptible host tissue to survive and reproduce. A wide range of host plant species are susceptible to the fig pin nematode, including many valuable fruit and vegetable crops such as figs, carrots and celery. They are also commonly found associated with woody perennials in California. P. hamatus inhabits soils in both Europe and North America, and was originally isolated from fig in central California in 1950.

== Hosts and Symptoms ==
Paratylenchus spp. nematodes have a wide variety of hosts with a recorded 25 different plants it is able to infect. Paratylenchus hamatus feeds on the roots of fig trees, celery, grapes, and peaches. P. hamatus has also been documented to cause patchy areas of chlorosis and wilting in lentils, resulting in up to 40% yield loss. Symptoms appear in patches or clusters and plants show a slow and general decline in growth and vigor. Common symptoms of infection are that of other root nematodes; stunted growth of the plant as well as the roots, chlorosis, leaf drop, reduced plant weight or yield, and undersized fruit are all symptoms which may be seen. These symptoms are universal across the different plant species it infects. Shallow localized lesions on the roots can be seen at feeding sites. No signs are present with the exception of the nematodes themselves and their eggs, which are not visible to the naked eye.

== Diagnosis ==
The disease is diagnosed through the above ground symptoms and examination of the roots and soil for P. hamatus. If the symptoms of wilting and chlorosis present in scattered groups or clusters, then the soil and root samples should be screened for P. hamatus. Since the nematodes are the only signs a pathologist must identify P. hamatus from morphological features such as their small size and stylet morphology to confirm their presence. Another clue in diagnosis a P. hamatus infestation is to look at the amount of nematodes present in the soil sample. Because of their small size P. hamatus is found in extremely large numbers.

== Life cycle ==
Paratylenchus hamatus is a migratory endoparasite which means it retains its vermiform shape during its adult life. Because of their close association with host root systems, pin nematodes are easily spread from field to field through the transportation of already infected soil and plant parts. Paratylenchus spp. females generally lay eggs one at a time and can lay up to 4 eggs per day when feeding on host tissue. When eggs hatch 7 or 8 days after laying, the juvenile nematodes seek out plant roots to feed upon. Young, easily penetrated root tips appear to be the main food source for juveniles, which have smaller stylets compared to their adult counterparts. All pin nematodes feed on root epidermal cells and will migrate to a new feeding site once the nutrients have been depleted. As they feed and grow, juvenile pin nematodes will go through a series of four molts, growing a new stylet and outer cuticle each time. When the fourth juvenile stage (J4 or preadult) is reached, the nematodes may enter a survival stage in which they are resistant to unfavorable conditions such as low soil moisture, extreme temperatures, and lack of food. The preadults can survive over 4 years when in this state despite not feeding, as their stylets are diminished and do not function properly. The survival stage is not produced in conditions that favor functions such as feeding and reproduction. After the final molt from the fourth juvenile stage, adult pin nematodes emerge. P. hamatus is a dioecious species, having both males and females. When the adult stage is reached, males mate with females to produce fertilized eggs. However, males are not always necessary for egg fertilization in pin nematodes. In a few species of Paratylenchus, males are not common and it is possible for females to lay fertilized eggs without mating. Females tend to lay more eggs when feeding than when they are not feeding.

== Environment ==
They are primarily located in North America and Europe in cooler environments with adequate moisture since they cannot move without the presence of water films in the soil. They can also be found in both cultivated and non-cultivated soil types, predominantly in the soil surrounding the roots of fig tree. They tend to be more of a problem in vineyards that have an ample supply of woody shrubs close together. However, these nematodes can persist in very adverse soil environmental conditions (decreases in nutrients, low moisture contents and temperature) in the J4 or pre-adult stage. Paratylenchus spp. have been shown to cause more damage in host root tissue when temperatures are around 20 °C and they prefer levels of pH around 6.5 for optimal reproduction. However, the pathogenicity of Paratylenchus spp. at pH levels lower than 6.5 is typically not altered.

== Management ==
Fumigation with 1,2-dibromoethane can be an effective tool to reduce the number of Paratylenchus spp. in the soil, but the process typically kills most of the beneficial soil fauna as well. This can have additional negative repercussions on the soil health. Fumigation would also kill the plants you are trying to cultivate, so the soil would need to be fumigated before the planting date. Crop rotation with small grains is also another management tool for Paratylenchus hamatus since they typically parasitize on fruit and vegetable crops. For post-planting control some non-fumigant nematicides can be used, but the effectiveness is not always consistent.

== Importance ==
P. hamatus has been shown to have different levels of effect on different crops. In California, P. hamatus is the most common pin nematode and has been seen to reduce crop yield of grapes in vineyards and fig farms by stunting plant growth and reducing fruit size. This ultimately results in loss of profits for local farmers. However, data from stone fruit farms in California show no damage to crops with populations of pin nematodes reaching 3000 nematodes/ 1 kg of soil. There is also evidence that populations of pin nematodes around 500 nematodes/ 1 kg of soil work as antagonists for other more damaging nematodes producing healthier trees. So in that case they are not really detrimental to the plant, but possible indirectly beneficial. This not always the case however. For example, P. hamatus in mint caused losses of 25% - 36% when planted in soil with 8000 nematodes/ quart, which shows it does not play an antagonistic role. Overall, the disease severity of P. hamatus is variable and is specific to the species of plant that it is parasitizing on and the concentration at which it is found.

== See also ==
- List of alfalfa diseases
- List of carnation diseases
- List of grape diseases
- List of mint diseases
