= Anguina tritici =

Wheat seed and leaf gall nematode

Scientific classification
- Domain: Eukaryota
- Kingdom: Animalia
- Phylum: Nematoda
- Class: Secernentea
- Order: Tylenchida
- Family: Anguinidae
- Genus: Anguina
- Species: A. tritici

Binomial name
- Anguina tritici (Steinbuch, 1799) Chitwood, 1935

Synonyms
- Anguillula scandens Schneider, 1866; Anguillula tritici (Steinbuch, 1799) Grube, 1849; Anguillulina scandens (Schneider, 1866) Goodey, 1932; Anguillulina tritici (Steinbuch, 1799) Gervais & van Beneden; Anguina tritici (Steinbuch, 1799) Gervais & van Beneden, 1859; Rhabditis tritici (Steinbuch, 1799) Dujardin, 1845; Tylenchus scandens (Schneider, 1866) Cobb, 1890; Tylenchus tritici (Steinbuch, 1799) Bastian, 1865; Vibrio tritici Steinbuch, 1799

Pathogenic nematode

Anguina tritici (ear-cockle nematode, seed-gall nematode, seed and leaf gall nematode, wheat gall nematode, wheat seed gall nematode, wheat seed-gall nematode, wheat seed and leaf gall nematode) is a plant pathogenic nematode.

== History and significance ==
Anguina tritici was the first plant parasitic nematode to be described in the literature in 1743. It causes a disease in wheat and rye called "ear-cockle" or seed gall. Originally found in many parts of the world but has been eradicated from the western hemisphere. Currently in north Africa and west Asia only. Yield losses up to 70% have been reported, ranging from 30-70%. Threshold of 10,000 juveniles/kg soil develop disease.

== Morphology ==
It is a large nematode, ranging from 3–5 millimetres (1/8–1/4 in) in length. Anguina tritici has a three part esophagus and the esophageal glands do not overlap with intestine. The female body tends to be thickened and curved ventrally. It has a short stylet (8-11 μm). Females have one ovary and the vulva located posterior. Males possess small spicules and small bursae or alae.

== Life cycle/reproduction ==
Juveniles find a host and move up the plant in a film of water. They invade meristems and penetrate inflorescences. Once in the developing seed they molt, become adults, mate, and reproduce. Eggs laid by the female develop and hatch as J2 within the seed gall where they desiccate and become dormant. Dormant J2 overwinter in the seed galls until spring. They are released when galls come in contact with moist soil and hydrate. Total life cycle is completed in 113 days.

== Host parasite relationship ==
It is an ectoparasite that becomes endoparasitic invading inflorescence and developing seeds. It causes a disease called "ear-cockle", "gout" or seed gall on wheat and rye, and also infects barley and oat. It does not infest maize or sorghum. On wheat it causes stunted plants and distorted leaves. Seeds are transformed into galls which contain a dried mass of nematodes. If compared to normal wheat seeds, galls are smaller in size, lighter, and their color ranges from light brown to black (normal wheat seeds are tan in color).

== Management ==
The disease has been eradicated by seed sanitation methods. Seed certification programs get rid of galls (lighter and less dense than seed) by flotation, hot water treatments, winnowing or gravity table seed processing.
