= Tylenchorhynchus maximus =

Scientific classification
- Kingdom: Animalia
- Phylum: Nematoda
- Class: Secernentea
- Order: Tylenchida
- Family: Belonolaimidae
- Genus: Tylenchorhynchus
- Species: T. maximus

Binomial name
- Tylenchorhynchus maximus Allen, 1955

Species of nematode worm

Tylenchorhynchus maximus is a plant pathogenic nematode infecting barley.
