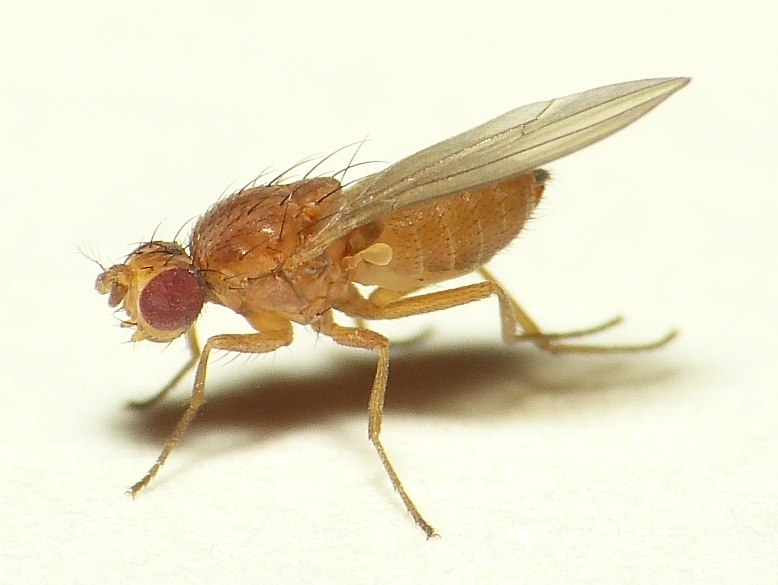
- Scaptomyza flava

Scientific classification
- Kingdom: Animalia
- Phylum: Arthropoda
- Clade: Pancrustacea
- Class: Insecta
- Order: Diptera
- Family: Drosophilidae
- Genus: Scaptomyza
- Species: S. flava

Binomial name
- Scaptomyza flava Fallén, 1823

= Scaptomyza flava =

Species of fly

Scaptomyza flava is an herbivorous leaf mining fly species in the family Drosophilidae. In Latin, flava means golden or yellow. The fly is amber to dark brown in color and approximately 2.5 mm in length. In Europe and New Zealand the larvae are pests of plants in the order Brassicales, including arugula, brassicas, broccoli, Brussels sprouts, bok choy, cabbage, canola, cauliflower, horseradish, kale, kohlrabi, napa cabbage, nasturtium, radish, rapini, rutabaga, turnip, wasabi and watercress. In New Zealand, its range has expanded to include host species that are intercropped with salad brassicas, including gypsophila, otherwise known as baby's breath, which is in the pink family (Caryophyllaceae) and the pea (Pisum sativum) in the Fabaceae. More typically, S. flava is oligophagous within the Brassicales. Scaptomyza are unusual within the Drospophilidae because the group includes species that are truly herbivorous. Other herbivorous drosophilids include D. suzukii, which attacks fruit very early during ripening (and so is a frugivore) and species within the genus Lordiphosa, from Africa and Asia, which also include leaf miners. Most drosophilids feed on microbes associated with decaying vegetation and sap fluxes.

== Distribution ==
Scaptomyza flava is Holarctic in distribution, commonly found across Europe, Asia and North America and only recently has been discovered in New Zealand, where it was first mistaken as a leaf mining agromyzid. The genus Scaptomyza contains species found on all continents except Antarctica.

== Phylogeny ==
Scaptomyza flava belongs to the order Diptera, the family Drosophilidae, and the genus Scaptomyza along with around 272 other species. Scaptomyza is a monophyletic genus nested within the paraphyletic Drosophila lineage that includes D. mojavensis, D. virliis and D. grimshawi. The genus Scaptomyza is sister to or paraphyletic with respect to the Hawaiian Drosophila radiation. Scaptomyza flava is a member of the subgenus Scaptomyza, which is the only subgenus in the Scaptomyza known to include obligate leaf mining species. However, S. flavella, in the subgenus Bunostoma, is a facultative leaf miner of New Zealand sea celery, but adult females oviposit in decaying leaves and so living leaves are attacked by larvae that move in from decaying leaves.

Scaptomyza flava was originally described as Drosophila flava in 1823, but later was redescribed as Scaptomyza flava when the genus Scaptomyza was erected (based on morphological differences with other Drosophila, including longer wings relative to the length of the body). The species has also previously been referred to as S. apicalis and S. flaveola. The most closely related living relative of S. flava is S. montana, which forms a clade sister to S. nigrita. More distantly related to the mustard-feeding Scaptomyza is S. graminum, which feeds on Caryophyllaceae.

== Life history ==
=== Life cycle ===
In captivity, the duration of the Scaptomyza flava life cycle is approximately three weeks, with an average egg to adult growth period of around 20.52 days. The length of the life cycle is over two times as long as yeast-feeding Drosophila like D. melanogaster, a difference likely due to the fact that leaves are less nutritious and mount a potent chemical defense response against the eggs and leaf mining larvae.

Like other adult females in the subgenus Scaptomyza, have highly sclerotized (hardened and darkened) ovipositors valves that are studded with 20-30 tooth-like sensilla. The dentate ovipositors are used both as a trophic organ and an egg-laying organ. To make a hole, the females crawl to the lower side of the leaf and using the blunt end of the ovipositor, move the two valves from side to side, carving a hole (also called a stipple) in the leaf, usually leaving the upper epidermis intact. Once retracting the ovipositor from the wound, they turn counter-clockwise and extend the proboscis to drink the juice that seeps into the wound. Adult females often have green abdomens as a result. Eggs are laid in feeding punctures introduced to the host plant by the female. Larvae hatch somewhere around 48 hours after the female deposits the eggs in the puncture. Once hatched, the larvae feed on the mesophylll tissue within the leaves and make a serpentine mine as they make their way toward the petiole and create a blotch mine as they mature (completing two more molts as a larvae) or move to a new leaf. Most individuals remain in the same plant through multiple stages of development. The larvae then either remain in the leaves or pupariate in the soil.

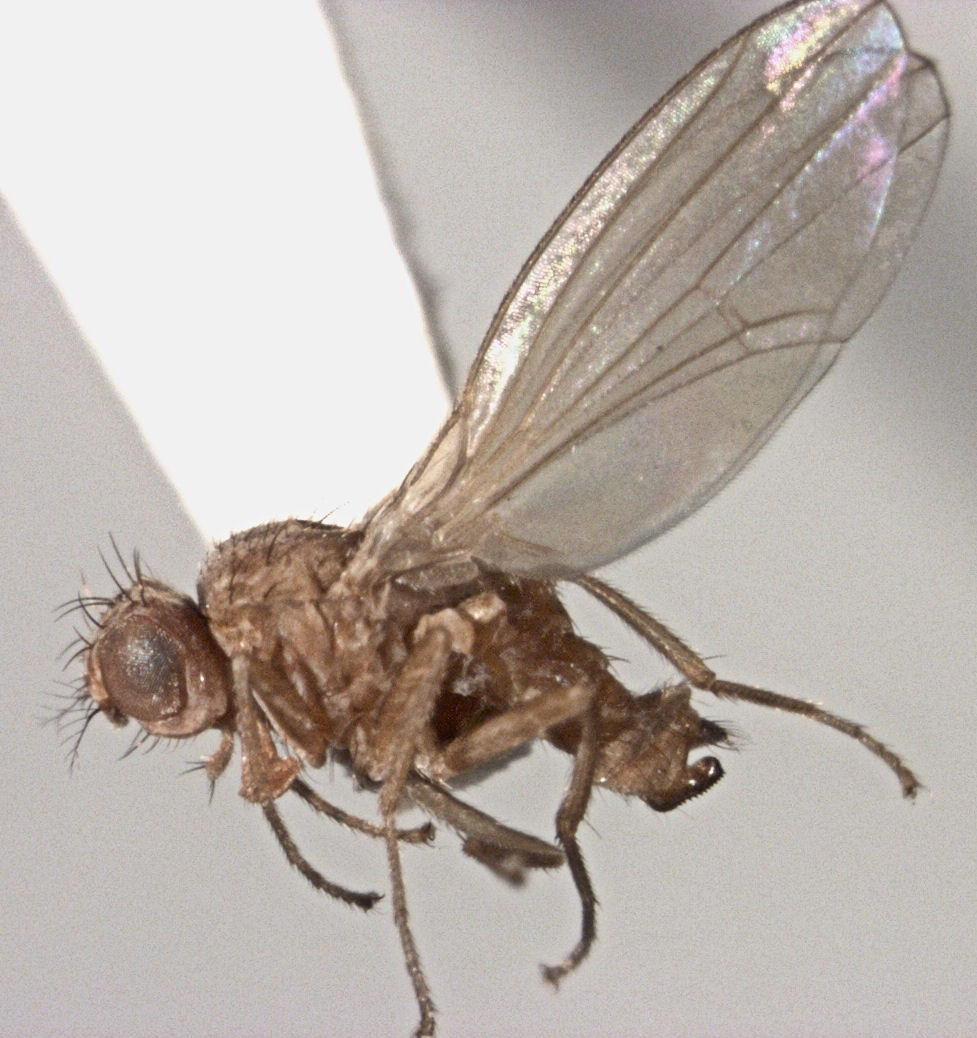
Scaptomyza flava female

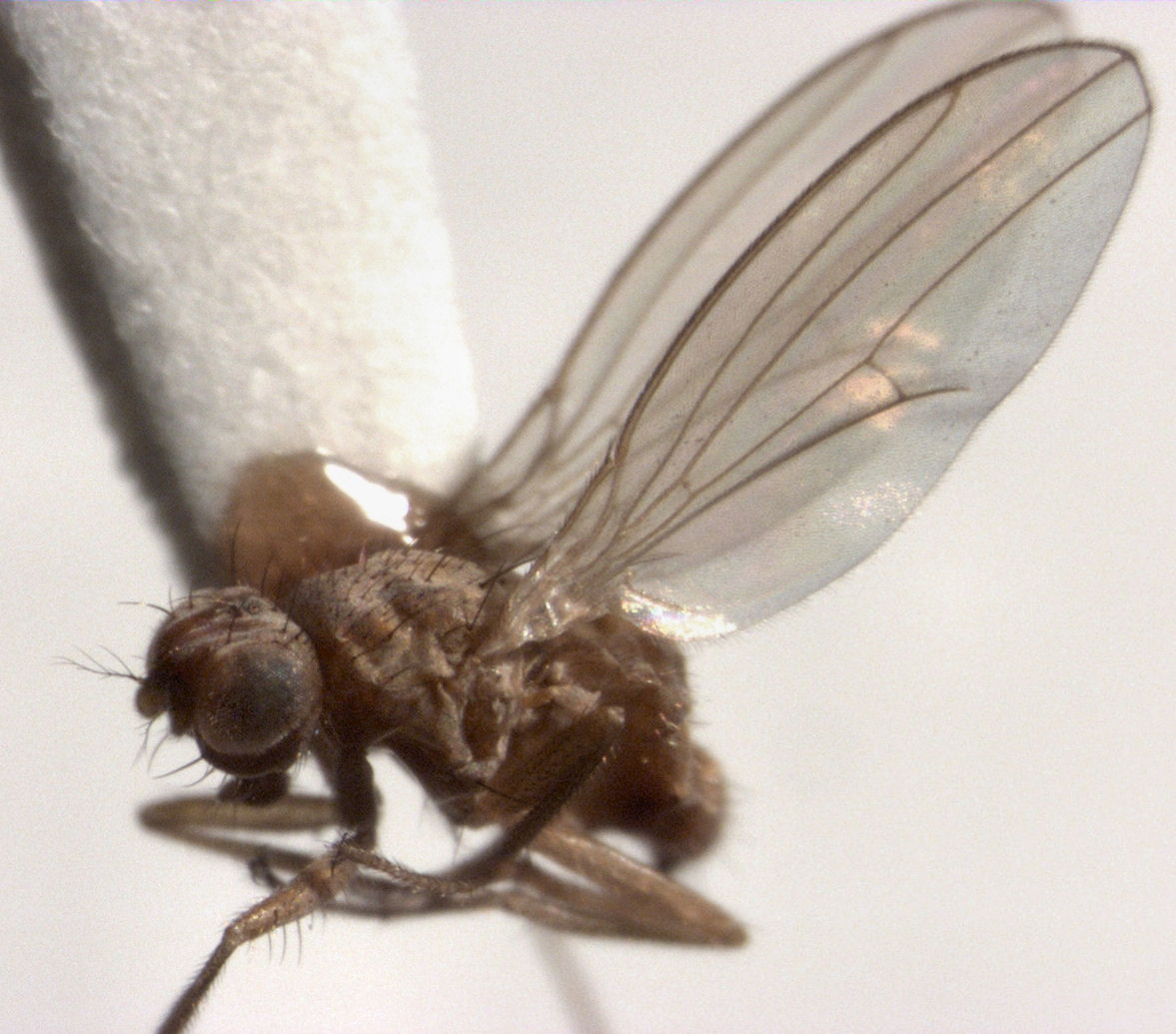
Scaptomyza flava male

=== Mating ===
Scaptomyza flava participate in anisogamous mating, like most animals. When males are exposed to females in a laboratory setting, they take two to three minutes to begin mating rituals. Generally, a male approaches a female and in a display of courtship flaps his wings and touches her body with his front legs. Females then become stationary as the male mounts her, and copulation ensues. Uninterrupted copulation typically lasts around twenty minutes. After mating, the males vibrate their wings and leave the female behind, showing no further interest.

Mating displays differed in frequency between mated and virgin males. Mated males are significantly more likely to practice courtship behavior and successfully mate than virgin flies. This suggests that male S. flava are capable of learning from previous mating experience. This behavior has also been reported in the distantly-related D. melanogaster. In the lab, 90% of flies will mate once or twice, with a much smaller percentage mating three or more times. The mating patterns of S. flava are linked to their circadian rhythm.

=== Oviposition and fertility ===
Scaptomyza flava begin oviposition approximately 2.7 days after emergence, with peak oviposition happening somewhere between five and ten days post-emergence. Over a lifetime, the average female produced approximately 130 eggs, of which approximately 71 were fertilized. Both oviposition and fertility peak within the first five to ten days post-emergence, with approximately 50% of the viable eggs are laid within the first 14 days from when the female began ovipositing.

== Food sources ==
=== Diet ===
Scaptomyza flava larvae are herbivorous endoparasites because they live in, consume and complete their entire immature development in the leaves of living plants. The adult females, like those of Agromyzidae, are also herbivores because they create feeding punctures with their ovipositors and feed on the leaf exudates that seep into the wounds.

==== Larvae ====
Scaptomyza flava larvae are dependent on living plants as a food source, as opposed to other herbivorous insects that can digest decaying plant matter. Scaptomyza flava larvae live in and feed on plants in the Brassicales. Most other drosophilids feed on a mixture of yeast, bacteria and decaying plant tissue and can be reared on media containing yeast, but S. flava does not complete development on these or any other media tested. The trophic level of S. flava is more similar to a fluid-feeding aphid based on highly depleted nitrogen profiles. One benefit of this behavior is protection from pathogens, but this comes at the price of increased susceptibility to parasitoid attack. On the other hand, the plant also mounts a massive increase in defensive chemical concentrations after perceiving attack by S. flava though the plant's asmonate pathway. Downstream of the jasmonate pathway are genes involved in the biosynthesis of glucosinolates, which are upregulated after attack. Some glucosinolates (aliphatic) break down into stable mustard oils (isothiocyanates), which persist in the environment (and are found in wasabi), but they are highly electrophilic, toxic molecules that rapidly bind to DNA and cysteine and lysine residues in cells. Both S. flava and D. melanogaster use the mercapturic acid pathway, like humans, to detoxify mustard oils. However, the glutathione S-transferase enzymes in the Scaptomyza species that feed on Brassicales are more efficient than any known from any animal at detoxifying mustard oils.

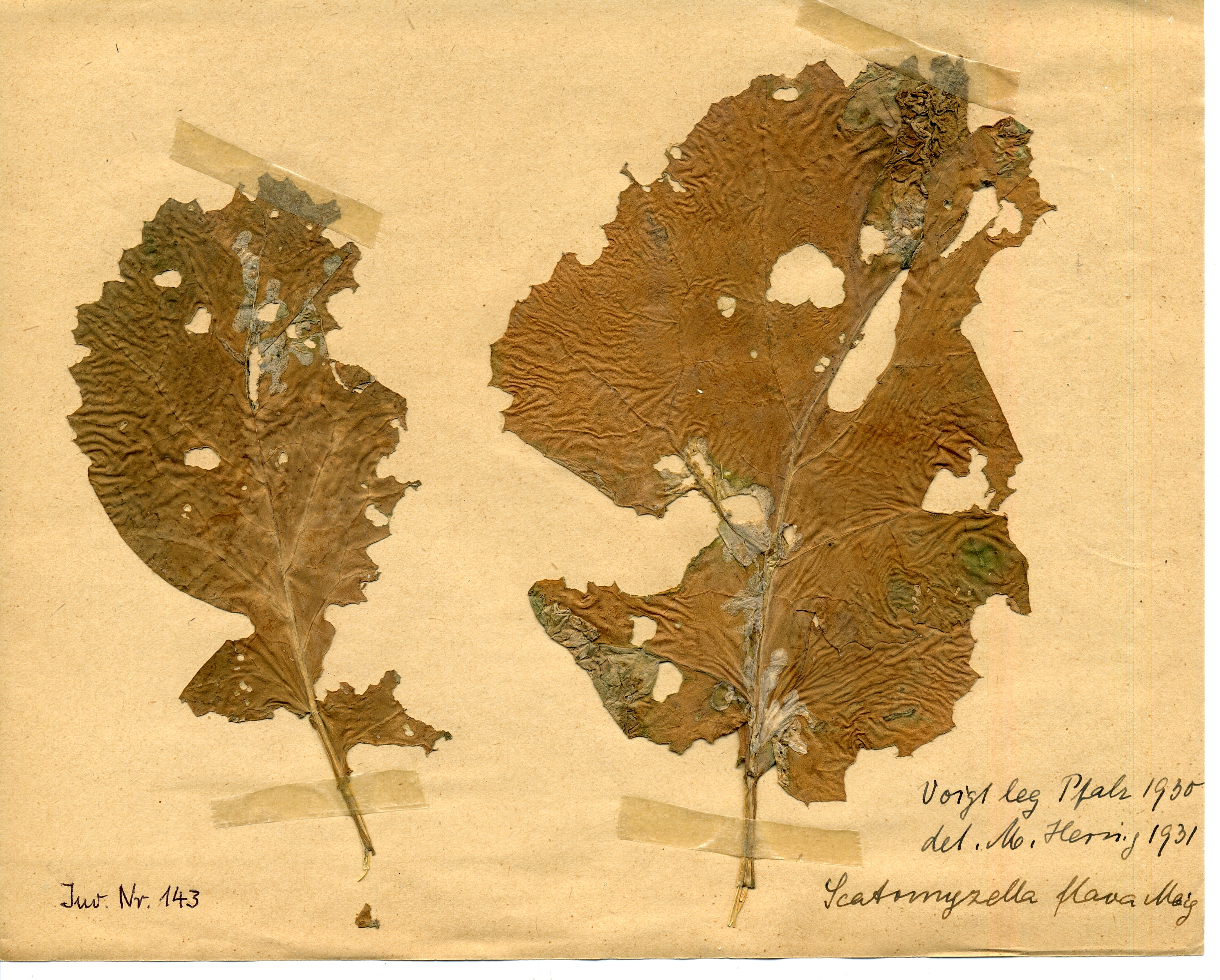
Damage to Brassica leaf by leaf-miner

==== Adult ====
Adult females also feed on the same plants as the larvae. Instead of eating the plants from the inside out, however, they feed on the plant secretions induced by the punctures they make with their ovipositors.

=== Evolution of herbivory ===
Herbivory is not unique to the genus Scaptomyza: one third of the living insect orders include herbivorous species and one-half of all living insect species are herbivorous. Thus, herbivory is the most successful life history from an evolutionary perspective. In the Diptera, herbivory has evolved at least 25 times independently. Specifically, herbivory in Scaptomyza is expected to have evolved between six and sixteen million years ago, with the most recent estimates placing this evolutionary event at approximately 13.5 million years ago. Most species of Scaptomyza are not herbivorous and over half of all living species (but no known leaf-miners) are native to Hawaii where they have diverse life histories, from spider egg sac parasitoids to leaf breeding (feeding on microbes and even perhaps dead arthropods trapped on sticky surfaces).

Molecular phylogenetic analyses suggest herbivory evolved only once in the genus Scaptomyza. Other species in the family Drosophilidae have a strong affinity for detecting the odors of yeast, a trait that S. flava has lost evolutionarily because its lineage has lost three genes encoding odorant receptors (ORs) that are known in D. melanogaster to be tuned to alilphatic esters produced by yeast. When the genes encoding these ORs are knocked out in D. melanogaster the flies may not orient properly toward these volatiles. The loss of ability to sense yeast is associated with evolutionary events leading to the evolution of herbivory. Adult female S. flava are attracted to volatile mustard oils, like most specialists of Brassicales plants, which have co-opted these toxic chemicals as indicators of their host plants. ORs encoded by recently duplicated Or67b genes that evolved rapidly in the S. flava lineage were found to be tuned to volatile mustard oils, which are emitted by wounded Brassicales plants. A similar phenomenon occurred independently in the diamondback moth Plutella xylostella. When one of these ORs, Or67b, is expressed in two different olfactory circuits in D. melanogaster, flies are attracted to mustard oils, which is not typical for D. melanogaster. This suggests that S. flava Or67b, when artificially expressed in a distant relative that feeds on yeast in rotting fruit, can result in an attraction behavior to mustard oils, possibly explaining how specialization on toxic plants can occur through simple genetic changes. Methyl salicylate, a derivative of the ubiquitous plant hormone salicylic acid, is also known to attract S. flava flies at traps in New Zealand. S. flava is not captured at traps baited with bananas and yeast. Most drosophilids, especially those associated with rotting fruit, encounter ethanol and have evolved mechanisms for tolerating and even using it to combat parasitoids. Although drosophilds vector yeast and may be mutualists, the plants attacked by Scaptomyza are harmed by these flies. As a result, they mount a rapid chemical defense to render the food and habitat an inhospitable environment after wounding is detected. When the jasmonate or glucosinolate pathways are knocked out in host plants, S. flava larvae perform better, suggesting that these pathways are involved in a level of resistance to the flies. Conversely, when plants are pre-treated with jasmonate, larvae perform worse.

==== Bypassing glucosinolates ====
The species S. flava and S. nigrita have evolved the ability to partially metabolize the hydrolysis products of glucosinolates, which include the isothiocyanates, and are toxic chemicals synthesized by mustard plants and relatives as a defense mechanism. Other species in the family Drosophilidae are largely unable to overcome these toxins. Glucosinolates play a role in regulating stress-related genes in S. flava, which is different from the specialized systems that other herbivores have developed to bypass the toxic effect of the chemical.

== Mutualism ==
Scaptomyza flava adult females and larvae inoculate their host plants with bacteria to aid in the feeding process. Specifically, S. flava may introduce Pseudomonas syringae to the host plant, which interferes with the anti-herbivore defenses of the host plant. Both adult females and larvae are capable of acting as bacterial vectors. Scaptomyza flava larvae not only prefer to eat plants infected with P. syringae, but have actually been shown to develop faster when feeding on infected plants. The relative S. nigrita has a complex association with phyllosphere bacteria, that likely includes antagonisms, mutualisms, and commensalisms between the leaf miner and microbes.

== Horizontal gene transfer ==
Genes encoding bacterial or phage-derived toxins have been identified in the genome sequence of S. flava. These genes were previously found to be associated with APSE phage toxin cargo genes that confer resistance to parasitoid wasp attack when the phage genes are found in endosymbiotic bacteria that infect aphids.

== Interactions with humans ==
Scaptomyza flava feed on various agricultural staples, often damaging the plants in which they live. While heavy infestations on various food crops can reduce yields, specific measures are not usually taken to contain the fly.

== As a model organism ==
Scaptomyza flava is being developed as a model to study the interactions between plants and herbivorous arthropods. Because it is relatively closely related to the "fruit fly" Drosophila melanogaster, the evolution of genes in its genome are more readily characterized. Specific genetic changes that have evolved and are involved in the adaptation to feeding on living plants can be more easily identified as a result. The fly attacks Arabidopsis thaliana in nature and because this host plant is the premier plant model organism, the genes important in mediating the interaction with S. flava, particularly those involved in resistance, can be studied readily.
