= Hemicriconemoides mangiferae =

Scientific classification
- Kingdom: Animalia
- Phylum: Nematoda
- Class: Secernentea
- Order: Tylenchida
- Family: Criconematidae
- Genus: Hemicriconemoides
- Species: H. mangiferae

Binomial name
- Hemicriconemoides mangiferae Siddiqi, (1961)

Species of roundworm

Hemicriconemoides mangiferae is a plant pathogenic nematode.

== History ==
Hemicriconemoides mangiferae was discovered in 1961 by Siddiqi. It is one of the smallest plant parasitic nematodes. It was originally identified as a parasite of mango roots from India. A complete description of developmental stages of H. mangiferae was provided by Pullikuth Ashokkumar and Sivagami Vadiveli in 1990.,

== Distribution ==
H. Mangiferae has been reported in the following countries: Australia, Brazil, Egypt, Fiji, Ghana, India, Israel, Korea, Mexico, Nigeria, Pakistan, Philippines, South Africa, Sudan, Thailand, United States of America, Vietnam, Venezuela, and the West Indies.

== Morphology ==
H. Mangiferae is characterized by having a close fitting, transparent sheath cuticle. It is primarily an ectoparasitic nematode but has been observed completely inside roots of both mango and litchi fruit. The genital tract length, stylet length and body length are the major criteria in differentiating the H. mangiferae. The body length is very short and stout with a long stylet. The procorpus is fused with the metacarpus to for a two part esophagus. Nematode is able to survive on many weed hosts.

== Life cycle and reproduction ==
The juvenile is a J1-J4, the J2 is what hatches out of the egg. J4 stage is where sexual differentiation occurs. Adult males do not feed or have a stylet. They are rare and not needed for reproduction. Parthenogenic reproduction may be the rule. H. Mangiferae lays eggs in the soil once mating has occurred.

== Host parasite relationship ==
H. Mangiferae anterior becomes embedded in the cortex of the root. It is typically an ectoparasite of the root. It can become completely embedded in the root and become an endoparasite. Necrotic tissue is often found as a result of the nematode feeding. The roots will become stubby as an effect of the nematode feeding. Nutrient and water uptake is interrupted and this will cause the decline of the tree. The visible symptoms can include leaf chlorosis, leaf tip burn, and excess fruit drop. The latter is the most noticeable symptom of infected trees. Levels of 6 nematodes per 1 cubic centimeter is considered detrimental to the tree. When orchards are established you must make sure that you have nematode free stock. Soil fumigation is one way to make sure that this is achieved.

== Management ==
Fruit yields can be maintained if infected trees are well irrigated and fertilized. Chemical options include pre-planting chemicals to treat the soil. 1,2-dibromo-3-chloropropane can be used but it is restricted in many countries including the USA. High organic content in the rhizosphere can be used to have a temporary decline for the nematode population. The management of this nematode is difficult. It is almost impossible to get rid of the nematode once you have an infection. The nematodes effects can be easily overcome by having an efficient and good irrigation and fertilization program you can overcome and fruit yield loss.
