= Hemicriconemoides kanayaensis =

Scientific classification
- Kingdom: Animalia
- Phylum: Nematoda
- Class: Secernentea
- Order: Tylenchida
- Family: Criconematidae
- Genus: Hemicriconemoides
- Species: H. kanayaensis

Binomial name
- Hemicriconemoides kanayaensis Nakasono and Ichinohe, (1961)

Species of roundworm

Hemicriconemoides kanayaensis is a plant pathogenic nematode affecting the tea plant.
