= Gerald Thorne =

Panamanian baseball player

- Outfielder
- Born: 1926 (age 98–99); Panama

Negro league baseball debut
- 1946, for the Philadelphia Stars

Last appearance
- 1946, for the Philadelphia Stars

Teams
- Philadelphia Stars (1946)

Gerald Thorne (born 1926) is a Panamanian former outfielder who played in the Negro leagues in the 1940s.

A native of Panama, Thorne played for the Philadelphia Stars in 1946. In nine recorded games, he posted four hits in 22 plate appearances.
