= Leptothrix hardyi =

Scientific classification
- Kingdom: Animalia
- Phylum: Arthropoda
- Subphylum: Chelicerata
- Class: Arachnida
- Order: Araneae
- Infraorder: Araneomorphae
- Family: Linyphiidae
- Genus: Leptothrix; Menge, 1869
- Species: L. hardyi

Binomial name
- Leptothrix hardyi (Blackwall, 1850)

Synonyms
- Phaulothrix Bertkau, 1885

Genus of spiders

Leptothrix is a monotypic genus of dwarf spiders containing the single species, Leptothrix hardyi. It was first described by Anton Menge in 1869.
