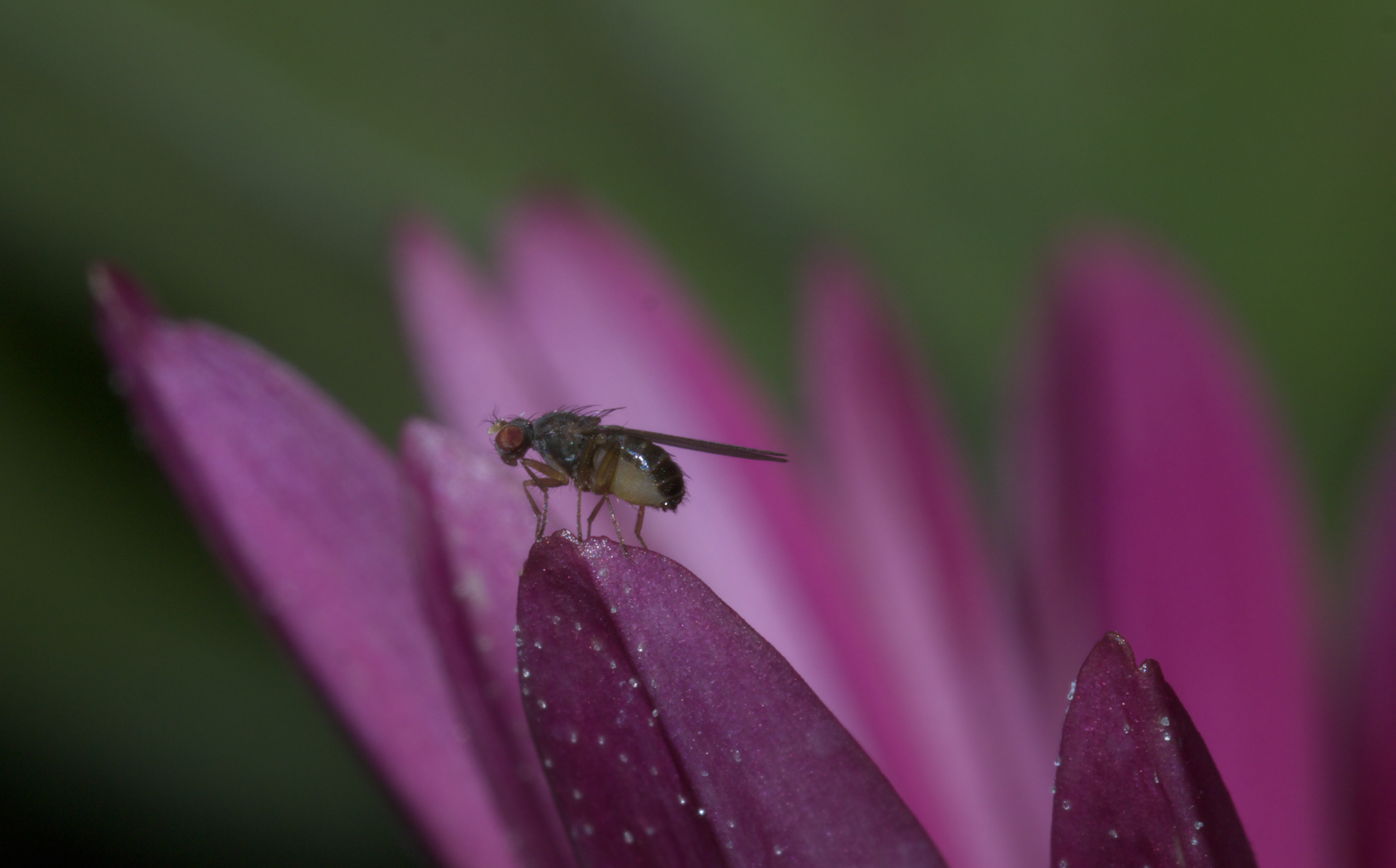

Scientific classification
- Kingdom: Animalia
- Phylum: Arthropoda
- Class: Insecta
- Order: Diptera
- Family: Drosophilidae
- Subfamily: Drosophilinae
- Genus: Scaptomyza; Hardy, 1850

Diversity
- 274+ species

= Scaptomyza =

Genus of flies

Scaptomyza is a genus of vinegar flies in the family Drosophilidae. As of 2025, there are currently 274 described species of Scaptomyza. Of those, 149 are endemic to the Hawaiian archipelago. This genus is part of the species-rich lineage of Hawaiian Drosophilidae, and is the sister lineage to the endemic Hawaiian Drosophila. The genus Scaptomyza is one of several nested within the genus Drosophila, rendering it paraphyletic.

== Description ==
Species of Scaptomyza are often cryptic and lacking in distinct morphological characters. Subgenera are generally defined from characters such as the number and size of the aristal rays, the number and size of thoracic setae, wing pattern, body coloration, and genitalia. Most of these traits are also used to distinguish individual species, though many are only discernible by the structure of the male terminalia. Species descriptions typically include important characters such as the coloration of various body parts, the number, orientation, and morphometrics of important bristles on the head and thorax (chaetotaxy), and the form of the genitalia.

== Taxonomy ==
=== History ===
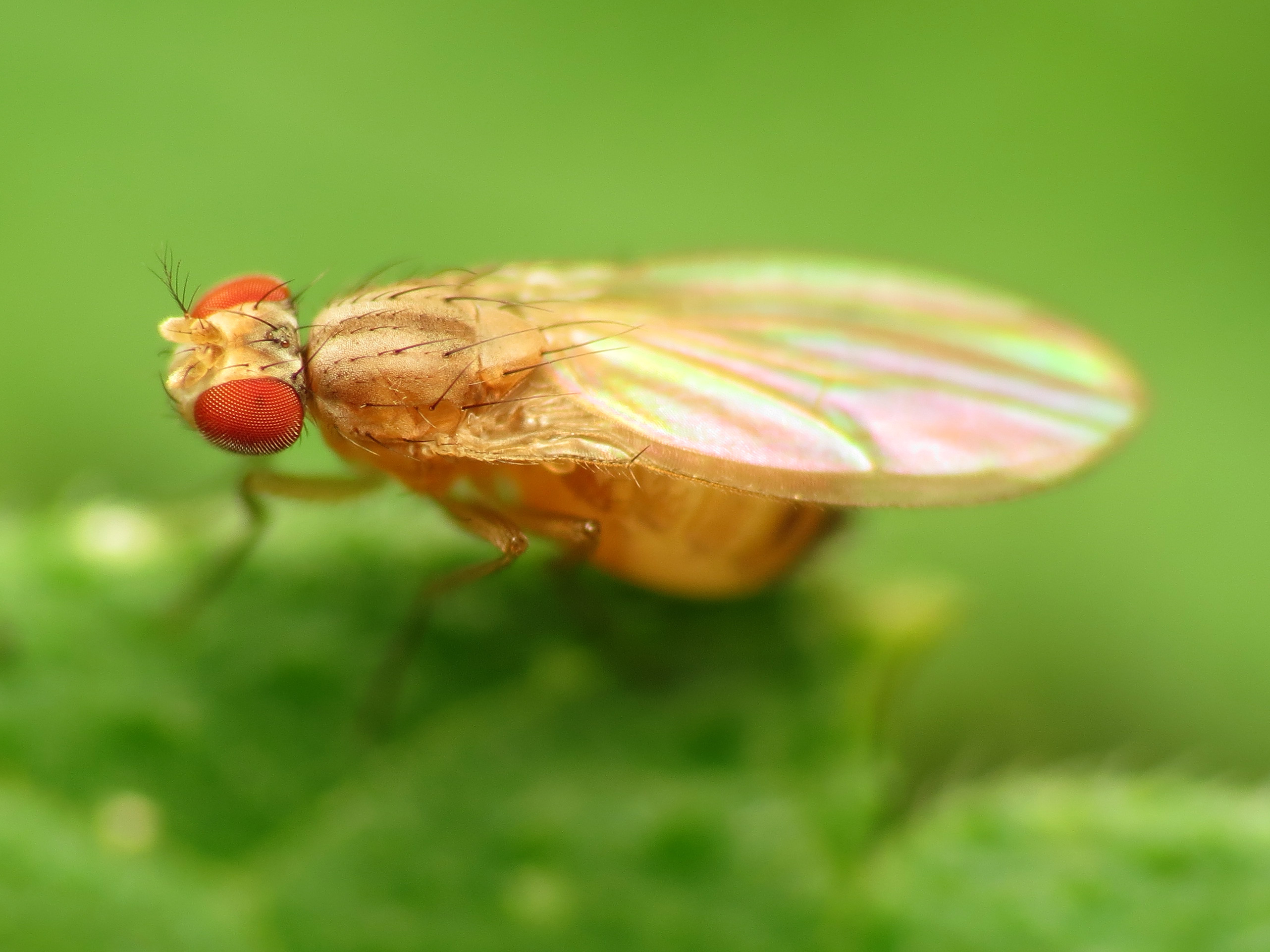
Adult Scaptomyza pallida

The genus Scaptomyza was erected by James Hardy in 1850 with the type species Drosophila graminum Fallén, and then only comprising two species: S. graminum and S. apicalis. Since then, it has become one of the most speciose groups of flies with 274 described species organized into 21 subgenera: Alloscaptomyza, Boninoscaptomyza, Bunostoma, Celidosoma, Dentiscaptomyza, Elmomyza, Engiscaptomyza, Euscaptomyza, Exalloscaptomyza, Grimshawomyia, Hemiscaptomyza, Lauxanomyza, Macroscaptomyza, Mesoscaptomyza, Metascaptomyza, Parascaptomyza, Rosenwaldia, Scaptomyza, Tantalia, Titanochaeta, and Trogloscaptomyza. A majority of these species and subgenera are endemic to the Hawaiian Islands as a result of adaptive radiation of the group there, with many more yet unnamed. The remaining species are cosmopolitan in distribution, found across all continents except Antarctica. Its taxonomy and evolutionary history has been relatively well-studied, with major workers including Sturtevant, Wheeler, Hardy, Throckmorton, Okada, Kaneshiro, Hackman, and Grimaldi in the 20th century, and Katoh, DeSalle, O’Grady, DeSalle, Lapoint, and Santos Rampasso in the 21st.

One specimen, assigned to the species S. dominicana, has been described from Dominican amber that is estimated to have been deposited at least 23 million years ago.

=== Phylogeny ===
The endemic Hawaiian Drosophilidae originate from the colonization of the islands by an ancestor 25 million years ago, and comprise two major lineages: the Hawaiian Drosophila (or Idiomyia sensu Grimaldi, 1990) and Scaptomyza. Scaptomyza is widely accepted to be sister to Idiomyia, and phylogenetically located within the larger paraphyletic genus Drosophila.

The first phylogenetic analysis with particular attention on Scaptomyza was conducted by O’Grady and DeSalle in 2008, who sampled partial mitochondrial genomes across 134 species of drosophilids (though only seven were Scaptomyza). They inferred a phylogenetic tree using maximum parsimony and Bayesian analysis, with bootstrap support values and Bayesian posterior probabilities for each node. Their results corroborated previous hypotheses that the Hawaiian Drosophila and Scaptomyza were sister groups (e.g. Throckmorton, 1966), though it disagreed with Grimaldi (1990), who placed Scaptomyza and Idiomyia in the more distantly-related Scaptomyza and Zygothrica genus groups, respectively.

Lapoint et al. (2013) greatly expanded the dataset from the 2008 study to include 63 species of Scaptomyza. They recovered a tree with Macroscaptomyza was nested within Parascaptomyza, and Elmomyza paraphyletic with respect to Rosenwaldia and Tantalia. The non-Hawaiian taxa did not form a clade, but were instead sister to different groups: Parascaptomyza and Macroscaptomyza were sister to the clade Elmomyza, Rosenwaldia, and Tantalia, and the nominate subgenus and Hemiscaptomyza were placed at increasingly deeper nodes.

Katoh et al. (2017) constructed a different topology than the previous studies, with Hemiscaptomyza and the nominate subgenus at the base of the group rather than Bunostoma + Exalloscaptomyza. The Hawaiian Scaptomyza were recovered as sister to Hawaiian Drosophila (Idiomyia), but were recovered as two separate clades: one of Exalloscaptomyza + Bunostoma, and the remaining subgenera in a clade sister to the mainland Parascaptomyza + Boninoscaptomyza.

== Evolution ==
=== Dispersal to Hawaii ===
Two possibilities have been proposed to explain the geographical distribution of Scaptomyza: the single versus multiple Hawaiian origin hypotheses. The current understanding of the historical origins and movements of Scaptomyza remain far from definitive, given the competing hypotheses and weak support along backbone and internal nodes in the published studies.

O’Grady and DeSalle found the mainland species of Scaptomyza (i.e. the non-Hawaiian taxa) were nested within the Hawaiian lineage, suggesting the genus had originated on the islands and subsequently migrated back to mainland North America. Their findings were corroborated by Lapoint et al., who suggested the ancestor of the lineage sister to Bunostoma + Exalloscaptomya emigrated to the mainland, following which a second colonization event by the ancestor of the remaining Hawaiian taxa occurred. Using a fossil specimen of Scaptomyza and biogeographic information as calibration points, a time of 20–30 mya was estimated for the origin date of the genus, and an emigration event from Hawaii was inferred around 20 mya. Using Lagrange and SIMMAP, the authors reconstructed Hawaii as the ancestral range of the group, suggesting an origin there in concordance with O’Grady & DeSalle.

More recently, Katoh et al. challenged the single origin hypothesis. In concordance with their tree, the authors inferred a multiple-origins hypothesis of the genus in Hawaii, in which Idiomyia and Scaptomyza originated and diverged from each other on the North American mainland 29.9–21.1 mya. Following the divergence, a single independent colonization of the Hawaiian Islands by the ancestor of Idiomyia occurred. Meanwhile, Scaptomyza spread across the globe and colonized Hawaii from Australasia in two separate events by the ancestor of the Exalloscaptomyza + Bunostoma clade and the ancestor of the remaining Hawaiian Scaptomyza.

=== Progression rule ===
The progression rule is a phenomenon observed in many insular taxa in which the age of islands in an archipelago is correlated with the age of lineages in the taxon. Interestingly, the progression rule has so far only been recorded in one group of Elmomyza. In contrast, members of Bunostoma show signs of diversifying “up” the islands, in which younger islands are occupied by earlier-diverging members.

== Natural history ==
=== Diet ===
Many Scaptomyza, like other drosophilids, are saprophagic as larvae. In the Hawaiian taxa, there is a tendency for related species to possess a similar host or substrate. A number of species, such as the cosmopolitan Scaptomyza graminum and numerous species of the nominate and other subgenera, are leaf miners of various plant families. Compared to the larger Drosophila, Scaptomyza are more often found inhabiting ephemeral substrates such as flowers and decaying fruit, due to their small size and short generation time. Three species of Elmomyza are known to inhabit flowers of daisies (Asteraceae), while Exalloscaptomyza are specialists of Ipomoea morning glories; females of the latter subgenus unusually lay only a single egg or neonate larva on the flowers. A number of Scaptomyza exhibit peculiar larval ecologies. One subgenus, Titanochaeta, has evolved to exclusively feed on eggs of spiders, where the females have evolved a sharp, sclerotized ovipositor for piercing egg sacs. A number of closely related Elmomyza live on birdcatcher trees and feed on insects that become stuck to the plant. Most species of Hawaiian Scaptomyza and across the genus as a whole lack ecological data.

Phylogenetic analyses have also provided much insight into the ecology of Scaptomyza. Lapoint et al. (2013) found that the ancestral larval ecology was likely saprophytic, similar to most drosophilids, but specialized on certain plant taxa and specific plant parts. Their analysis provided phylogenetic evidence for conservatism with respect to changes in larval ecology of the group, suggesting that shifts in host and substrate occur rarely.

=== Mating behavior ===
Unlike the other Hawaiian Drosophila, in which males often sport showy secondary sex characteristics and mating involves a complex series of behaviors, Hawaiian Scaptomyza are wholly lacking in these aspects. Males are morphologically plain, and mating is typically an uncomplicated affair, with neither sex exhibiting much, if any, courtship and other pre/post-mating behaviors (Patrick O’Grady, pers. comm.). The mating process has been described for very few species of the group. Shakeel et al. described the mating behavior for the widespread pest species Scaptomyza flava, in which the males waved his wings around the female and palpated the female with his fore tarsi. After mating, the male performed wing vibrations and moved in a zig-zag pattern for a short period. During the entire courtship process, the female was stationary, unless it endeavored to kick off a disfavored male.

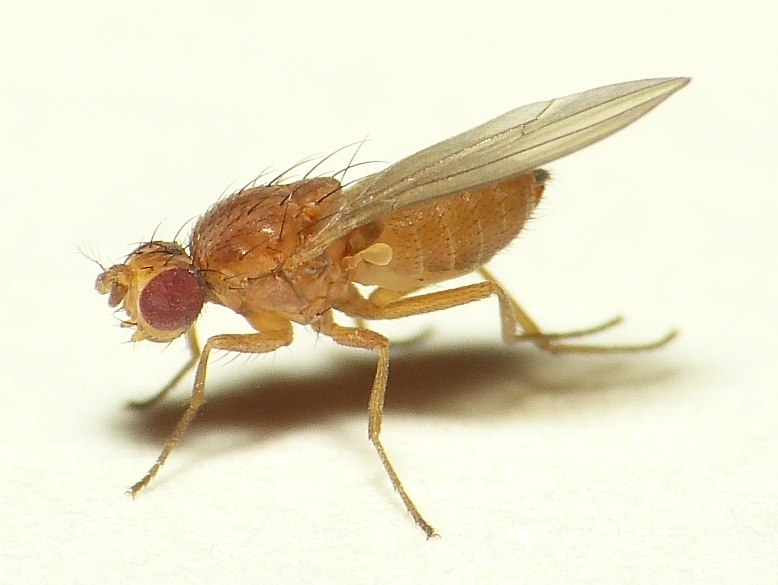
Adult Scaptomyza flava

=== Microbiome ===
Little has been published about the microbiota of Scaptomyza in comparison to the well-studied Drosophila. Larvae of species that have evolved to feed on living plant tissue (i.e. leaf miners) are generally colonized by the bacteria of their host plant. One member of the genus in particular, S. flava, is studied as a laboratory model organism for herbivory and the evolution of plant-insect interactions. The gut biota for the Barbarea vulgaris-feeding S. flava was found to have 99.7% similar microbes to those of the plant. It is likely that ingestion of these microbes aid in detoxification, breakdown of plant tissue, and metabolization of nutrients for the flies. Arabidopsis-feeding S. flava that were treated with antibiotics showed lower feeding rates and fecundity than those left untreated. As plant defenses pose a significant barrier to host-switching for herbivorous insects such as Scaptomyza, such symbiotic relationships may facilitate niche shifts by subverting the need for the fly itself to evolve endogenous mechanisms.

== See also ==
- List of Scaptomyza species
