= Tylenchulidae =

Scientific classification
- Kingdom: Animalia
- Phylum: Nematoda
- Class: Chromadorea
- Order: Rhabditida
- Superfamily: Criconematoidea
- Family: Tylenchulidae; Skarbilovitch, 1947

Synonyms
- Tylenchocriconematidae

Family of nematodes

Tylenchulidae is a family of nematodes belonging to the order Tylenchida.

== Genera ==
Genera:

- Boomerangia Siddiqi, 1994
- Cacopaurus Thorne, 1943
- Gracilacus
- Tylenchulus Cobb, 1913
