= Belonolaimidae =

Scientific classification
- Kingdom: Animalia
- Phylum: Nematoda
- Class: Secernentea
- Order: Tylenchida
- Family: Belonolaimidae

Family of nematodes

Belonolaimidae is a family of nematodes belonging to the order Tylenchida.

== Classification ==
Geraert in his The Dolichodoridae of the World adopts the view of several other taxonomists and considers the species in Belonolaimidae to form a subfamily Belonolaiminae of the family Dolichodoridae.

== Genera ==
- Geocenamus Thorne & Malek, 1968
- Morulaimus Sauer, 1966
- Quinisulcius
- Tylenchorhynchus Cobb, 1913
