= Anguinidae =

Scientific classification
- Kingdom: Animalia
- Phylum: Nematoda
- Class: Secernentea
- Order: Tylenchida
- Family: Anguinidae

Family of roundworms

Anguinidae is a family of nematodes.
