= Heterodera sacchari =

Scientific classification
- Domain: Eukaryota
- Kingdom: Animalia
- Phylum: Nematoda
- Class: Secernentea
- Order: Tylenchida
- Family: Heteroderidae
- Genus: Heterodera
- Species: H. sacchari

Binomial name
- Heterodera sacchari Luc & Merni, 1963

Species of roundworm

Heterodera sacchari, the sugarcane cyst nematode, mitotic parthenogenic sedentary endoparasitic nematode. This plant-parasitic nematode infects the roots of sugarcane, and the female nematode eventually becomes a thick-walled cyst filled with eggs. Aboveground symptoms are species specific and are similar to those caused by other Heterodera species. Symptoms include: stunted and chlorotic plants, and reduced root growth. Seedlings may be killed in heavily infested soils.

== History ==
Heterodera sacchari was first identified in 1963 by Luc and Merny. Throughout the hot tropics and Western Africa, H. sacchari is referred as one of the most economically important cyst nematode species.

== Distribution ==
This species is found in tropical climates and is considered a pest in African and some Asian countries. There have been reports in Jamaica.

== Morphology ==
Eggs are 112-139 μm long and 43-45 μm wide. Second-stage juveniles (J2s) have an annulated cuticle 1.7 μm wide in the middle of the body. The lateral field is composed of three longitudinal lines. The lips are dome-shaped with three annules. The stylet is strong with well-developed knobs. Males are rare, but when found have annules 2.5 μm in the middle of the body with three faint longitudinal lines in the lateral field. The lip region is dome-shaped with 4-5 (sometimes 6) annules. Females become obese and lemon shaped, producing brown cysts when dead varying in size from 0.3-1.0 mm in length and 0.2-0.8 mm in width, observable with the naked eye. The stylet is weak with a length of 23-25 μm with small, rounded knobs.

Heterodera sacchari is morphologically similar to H. elachista, H. oryzae, and H. oryzicola and can be distinguished using features and biochemical characteristics.

== Life cycle and reproduction ==
Heterdera sacchari are mitotic parthenogenesis, meaning males are not required for reproduction and most nematodes will develop into females. Eggs with first-stage juveniles are found inside cysts in the soil. Once stimulated to hatch, the first molt is completed in the egg and second-stage juveniles (J2s) emerge from the egg and migrate to the root. Once inside the root, J2s establish a specialized feeding site called a syncytium in the stele. Once this site is established, the nematode is no longer moving. The feeding J2s then molt 2 more times into third- and fourth-stage juveniles and grow as they are feeding. The last molt reveals the adult stages.

Males of H. sacchari are rarely found, but return to vermiform (worm shape) and exit the root. Females do not move and continue to feed and swell. Females grow so large they rupture the root cortex and can be seen to the naked eye on the roots as white, lemon-shaped pinheads on the root. Females that have undergone parthenogenesis did not mate with a male and will fill with eggs. If a female mates with a male, it is completed once the female has ruptured the root and the posterior end is exposed to the soil where the males are. Once the female is filled with eggs, they will die and become thick-walled, leathery cysts that remain in the soil as survival structures with dormant eggs for many years.

== Host parasite relationship ==
Heterodera sacchari has a narrow host range. Major host crop infected by this nematode include sugarcane (Saccharum officinarum) and rice (Oryza sativa). Other plant hosts include bermudagrass (Cynodon dactylon), Bread grass (Brachiaria brizantha), carpet grass (Axonopus compressus), jungle rice (Echinocloa brizantha), sour grass (Paspalum conjugatum), goose grass (Eleusine indica), palisadegrass (Urochloa brizantha) and wild sugarcane (Saccharum spontaneum).

== Management ==
Reducing the movement of infested soil to other fields will help to decrease the occurrence. Cysts can be dispersed by the transport of soil on roots or machinery, as well as water, irrigation, and wind. Currently, there are no resistant varieties for rice or sugarcane, but there are partial resistance and tolerance. If it is possible, crop rotation with a non-host crop is recommended.
