= Heterodera medicaginis =

Scientific classification
- Kingdom: Animalia
- Phylum: Nematoda
- Class: Secernentea
- Order: Tylenchida
- Family: Heteroderidae
- Genus: Heterodera
- Species: H. medicaginis

Binomial name
- Heterodera medicaginis Kirjanova & Krall, 1971

Species of roundworm

Heterodera medicaginis, the alfalfa cyst nematode, is a plant pathogenic nematode which is cited as an invasive species. It is closely allied to Heterodera daverti, H. glycines and H. sonchophila in the H. schachtii-group. The only known host plant of this obligate parasite is the important crop alfalfa or lucerne, Medicago sativa.

== Description ==
The female alfalfa cyst nematode is white and shaped like a lemon with a body length of 0.4 to 1.2 mm and a width of 0.2 to 0.9 mm. The male is vermiform with a body length of 1.2 to 1.4 mm and a width of about 0.028 mm. The eggs are reniform, measuring 0.12 by 0.05 mm and the first two instar larvae are vermiform. The second instar larvae are mobile in damp soil and search down to a depth of 30 centimetres for suitable roots to invade. Here they develop further and become sedentary, burying their heads in cells and feeding on the cell sap. The central part of their bodies swells, and after moulting they develop into bottle-shaped third instar larvae and after moulting again, lemon-shaped fourth instar larvae. The swollen larvae break out of the root cortex. At this stage they differentiate into males and females. The males become mobile and migrate through the soil searching for females with which to mate. The females remain attached to the root tissues by their heads, continue feeding and start laying eggs. These are held within the bodies of the females which later die and turn into brown cysts with hard cuticles. These eventually become detached from the roots. The eggs develop into larvae inside the cyst and some second instar larvae emerge into the soil to start a new cycle of development. Most of the larvae lie in a state of anabiosis within the cysts where they can remain dormant for several years and still be viable.

== Economic significance ==
The alfalfa cyst nematode causes a decrease in yield of herbage and seeds. The main criterion is the population density of larvae in spring. A 5-10% threshold of harmfulness occurs when there are 330 to 890 larvae per 100 cubic centimetres of soil. Control measures preventing yield losses include crop rotation and the use of tolerant varieties. Other factors affecting the harm done include the date of sowing, the density of seeding, the use of cover crops and the weather.
