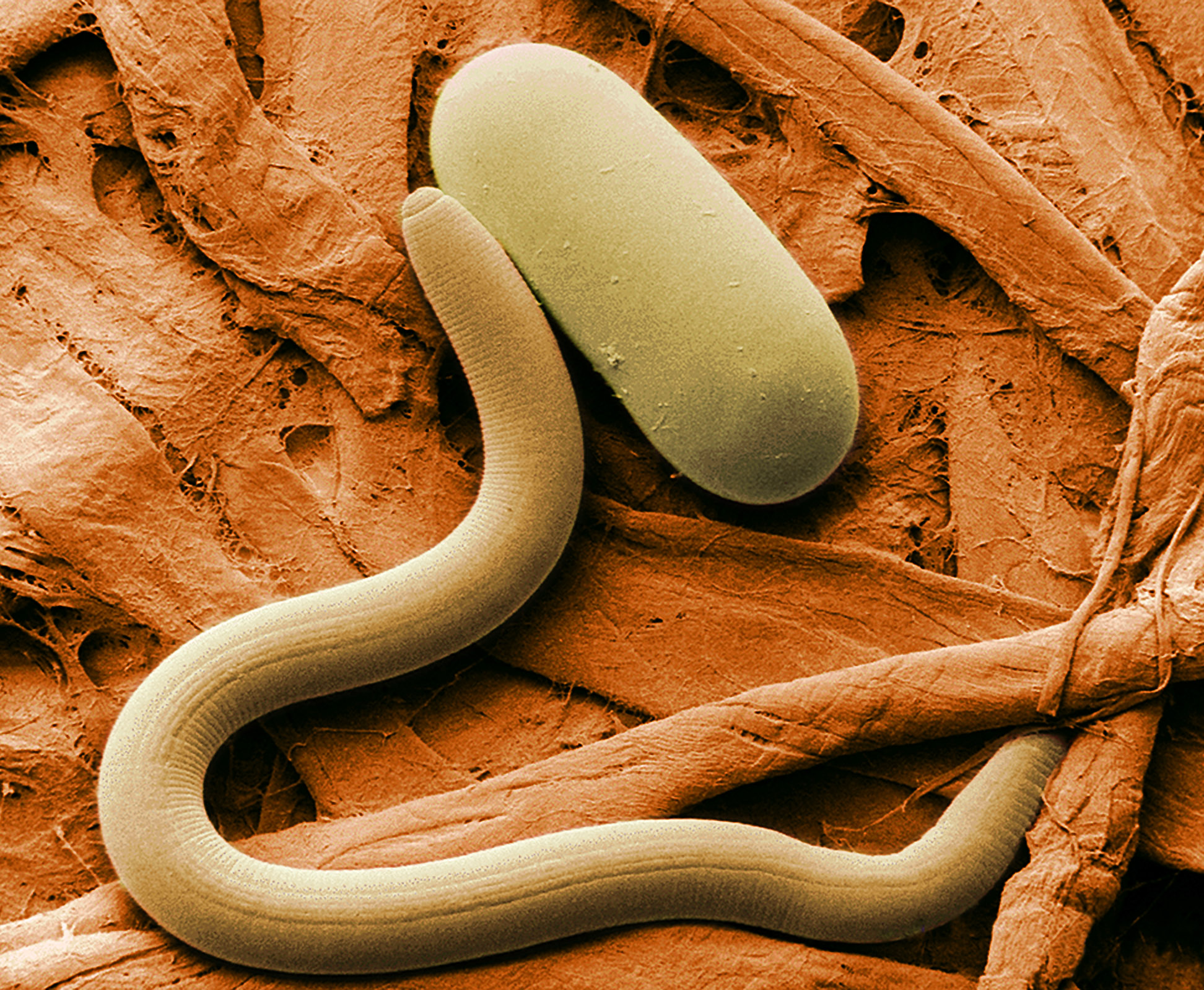
- Heterodera glycines

Scientific classification
- Domain: Eukaryota
- Kingdom: Animalia
- Phylum: Nematoda
- Class: Secernentea
- Order: Tylenchida
- Family: Heteroderidae
- Subfamily: Heteroderinae; Filipjev & Schuurmans Stekhoven, 1941

Genera
- Betulodera Sturhan, 2002; Cactodera Krall & Krall, 1978; Dolichodera Mulvey & Ebsary, 1980; Globodera Skarbilovich, 1959; Heterodera Schmidt, 1871; Paradolichodera Sturhan, Wouts & Subbotin, 2007; Punctodera Mulvey & Stone, 1976

= Heteroderinae =

Subfamily of roundworms

Heteroderinae is a subfamily of roundworms.
