= Heterodera delvii =

Scientific classification
- Domain: Eukaryota
- Kingdom: Animalia
- Phylum: Nematoda
- Class: Secernentea
- Order: Tylenchida
- Family: Heteroderidae
- Genus: Heterodera
- Species: H. delvii

Binomial name
- Heterodera delvii Jairajpuri, Khan, Setty & Govindu, 1979

Species of roundworm

Heterodera delvii (cereal cyst nematode) is a plant pathogenic nematode, who is cited as an invasive species.
