= Heterodera tabacum =

Scientific classification
- Kingdom: Animalia
- Phylum: Nematoda
- Class: Secernentea
- Order: Tylenchida
- Family: Heteroderidae
- Genus: Heterodera
- Species: H. tabacum

Binomial name
- Heterodera tabacum Lownsbery & Lownsbery, 1954

Species of roundworm

Heterodera tabacum is (synonym of Globodera tabacum) a plant pathogenic nematode affecting Jerusalem cherries (Solanum pseudocapsicum).

== See also ==
- List of Jerusalem cherry diseases
