= Heterodera cacti =

Scientific classification
- Domain: Eukaryota
- Kingdom: Animalia
- Phylum: Nematoda
- Class: Secernentea
- Order: Tylenchida
- Family: Heteroderidae
- Genus: Heterodera
- Species: H. cacti

Binomial name
- Heterodera cacti Filipjev & Schuurmans Stekhoven, 1941

Species of roundworm

Heterodera cacti is a plant pathogenic nematode affecting cacti.

== See also ==
- List of foliage plant diseases (Cactaceae)
