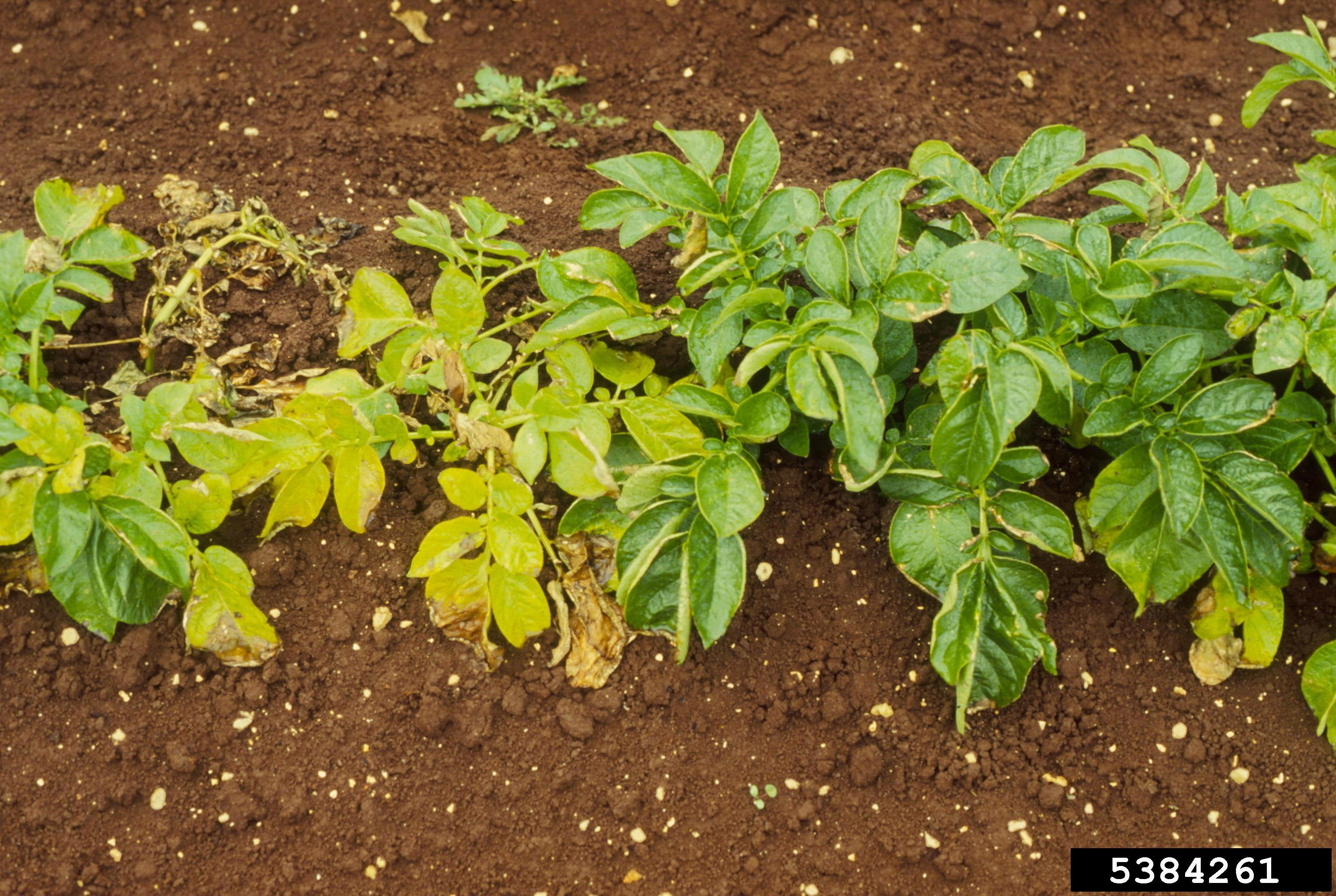

Scientific classification
- Kingdom: Animalia
- Phylum: Nematoda
- Class: Secernentea
- Order: Tylenchida
- Family: Heteroderidae
- Genus: Globodera
- Species: G. pallida

Binomial name
- Globodera pallida (Stone, 1973)

= Globodera pallida =

Species of roundworm

Globodera pallida is a species of nematode in the family Heteroderidae. It is well known as a plant pathogen, especially of potatoes. It is "one of the most economically important plant parasitic nematodes," causing major crop losses, and is a model organism used to study the biology of cyst nematodes. Its common names include potato cyst nematode, white potato cyst nematode, pale potato cyst nematode, potato root eelworm, golden nematode, and pale cyst nematode.

The female has a globe-shaped body with a thick, lacy cuticle. It retains its eggs inside its body rather than releasing them, and becomes a brown cyst when it dies. The female is white to cream in color. Globodera rostochiensis is similar in appearance, but the female is yellow in color for part of its life.

The male has a wormlike body which is held in a C- or S-shape.

This nematode is thought to be native to the Andes. Today it is found in 55 countries, mostly in temperate regions. The microscopic cysts are tough and can survive in soil particles, which are transported around the world on objects such as farming equipment and in flowing water. It has been primarily distributed on potatoes, which were introduced from South America to the rest of the world. It can also live on other solanaceous crops such as tomato and eggplant, and many solanaceous weed species, such as black nightshade (Solanum nigrum).

The juvenile nematodes feed on the roots of the plant. Eggs develop inside the females after fertilization, and when the females die they become tough cysts that protect the mature eggs. The eggs in the cysts can remain viable for up to 30 years. The cysts detach from the roots and drop into the soil, where they can be distributed via soil movement. An infested plant becomes yellow and wilted and loses its leaves.

This nematode is an important agricultural pest, especially in Europe. It causes economic losses of about £50 million per year in the United Kingdom alone. Laws defining best management practices have been passed to reduce the spread of the pest. The movement of soil and potatoes across national boundaries is monitored with quarantines. Farming equipment is cleaned, soil is tested for nematodes, contaminated soil is kept out of fields, and resistant cultivars of crops are alternated with susceptible varieties to reduce the possibility that a more virulent nematode will arise through selection.

The nematode is found nearly worldwide today, but it has been mostly kept out of the United States due to rigid quarantines. An exception is one outbreak that occurred in Idaho in 2006. Upon discovery of this outbreak, Japan banned potato imports from the United States for several years.

The genome of this nematode has been sequenced.
