= Heterodera filipjevi =

Scientific classification
- Domain: Eukaryota
- Kingdom: Animalia
- Phylum: Nematoda
- Class: Secernentea
- Order: Tylenchida
- Family: Heteroderidae
- Genus: Heterodera
- Species: H. filipjevi

Binomial name
- Heterodera filipjevi (Madzhidov, 1981)

Species of roundworm

Heterodera filipjevi is a plant pathogenic nematode affecting barley.

== See also ==
- List of barley diseases
