= Heterodera cardiolata =

Valentine cyst nematode

Scientific classification
- Kingdom: Animalia
- Phylum: Nematoda
- Class: Secernentea
- Order: Tylenchida
- Family: Heteroderidae
- Genus: Heterodera
- Species: H. cardiolata

Binomial name
- Heterodera cardiolata Kirjanova & Ivanova, 1969

Species of roundworm

Heterodera cardiolata is a plant pathogenic nematode.
