= Heterodera bergeniae =

Scientific classification
- Domain: Eukaryota
- Kingdom: Animalia
- Phylum: Nematoda
- Class: Secernentea
- Order: Tylenchida
- Family: Heteroderidae
- Genus: Heterodera
- Species: H. bergeniae

Binomial name
- Heterodera bergeniae Maqbool & Shahina, 1988

Species of roundworm

Heterodera bergeniae is a plant pathogenic nematode in Pakistan.
