= List of tobacco diseases =

This is a list of diseases of tobacco (Nicotiana tabacum). They present challenges to the successful cultivation of tobacco.

== Bacterial diseases ==
Bacterial diseases
Angular leaf spot (Synonym: Wildfire, Black fire)	Pseudomonas syringae pv. tabaci)
Granville wilt	Ralstonia solanacearum, formerly Pseudomonas solanacearum
Hairy roots	Agrobacterium rhizogenes
Hollow stalk	Erwinia carotovora subsp. carotovora E. carotovora subsp. atroseptica
Leaf gall	Rhodococcus fascians

== Fungal diseases ==
Fungal diseases
Anthracnose	Colletotrichum destructivum Glomerella glycines [teleomorph]
Barn spot	Cercospora nicotianae
Barn rot	Several fungi and bacteria
Black root rot	Thielaviopsis basicola
Bikini	Phytophthora nicotianae
Blue mold (downy mildew)	Peronospora tabacina = Peronospora hyoscyami f.sp. tabacina
Brown spot	Alternaria alternata
Charcoal rot	Macrophomina phaseolina
Collar rot	Sclerotinia sclerotiorum
Damping-off, Pythium	Pythium spp. Pythium aphanidermatum Pythium ultimum
Frogeye leaf spot	Cercospora nicotianae
Fusarium wilt	Fusarium oxysporum (several f. sp.)
Gray mold	Botrytis cinerea Botryotinia fuckeliana [teleomorph]
Mycosphaerella leaf spot	Mycosphaerella nicotianae
Olpidium seedling blight	Olpidium brassicae
Phyllosticta leaf spot	Phyllosticta nicotiana
Powdery mildew	Erysiphe cichoracearum
Ragged leaf spot	Phoma exigua var. exigua = Ascochyta phaseolorum
Scab	Hymenula affinis = Fusarium affine
Sore shin and damping-off	Rhizoctonia solani Thanatephorus cucumeris [teleomorph]
Southern stem rot Southern blight	Sclerotium rolfsii Athelia rolfsii [teleomorph]
Stem rot of transplants	Pythium spp.
Target spot	Rhizoctonia solani
Verticillium wilt	Verticillium albo-atrum Verticillium dahliae

== Nematodes, parasitic ==
Nematodes, parasitic
Bulb and stem (stem break)	Ditylenchus dipsaci
Cyst	Globodera solanacearum = Globodera virginiae Globodera tabacum
Dagger, American	Xiphinema americanum
Foliar	Aphelenchoides ritzemabosi
Lesion	Pratylenchus brachyurus Pratylenchus penetrans Pratylenchus spp.
Reniform	Rotylenchulus reniformis
Root-knot	Meloidogyne arenaria Meloidogyne hapla Meloidogyne incognita Meloidogyne javanica
Spiral	Helicotylenchus spp.
Stubby-root	Paratrichodorus spp. Trichodorus spp.
Stunt	Merlinius spp. Tylenchorhynchus spp.

== Viral and phytoplasma diseases ==
Viral mycoplasmalike organisms [MLO] diseases
Alfalfa mosaic	Alfalfa mosaic virus
Aster yellows	Phytoplasma
Beet curly top	Beet curly top virus
Bushy top	Tobacco vein distorting virus and tobacco bushy top virus in combination
Cucumber mosaic	Cucumber mosaic virus
Lettuce necrotic yellows	Lettuce necrotic yellows virus (in Nicotiana glutinosa)
Peanut stunt	Peanut stunt virus
Rosette disease	Tobacco vein distorting virus and tobacco mottle virus in combination
Stolbur	Phytoplasma
Tobacco etch	Tobacco etch virus
Tobacco leaf curl	Tobacco leaf curl virus
Tobacco mosaic	Tobacco mosaic virus and Satellite Tobacco Mosaic Virus
Tobacco necrosis	Tobacco necrosis virus
Tobacco rattle	Tobacco rattle virus
Tobacco ring spot	Tobacco ring spot virus
Tobacco streak	Tobacco streak virus
Tobacco stunt	Tobacco stunt virus
Tobacco vein mottling	Tobacco vein mottling virus
Tomato spotted wilt	Tomato spotted wilt virus
Vein banding	Potato virus Y
Wound tumor	Wound tumor virus

== Miscellaneous diseases and disorders ==
Miscellaneous diseases and disorders
Brown root rot	Pratylenchus spp. (nematodes)
Drought spot	Drought
False broomrape	Unknown
Frenching	Metabolite of Bacillus cereus
Stem break (in Europe)	Ditylenchus dipsaci (nematodes)
Sunscald	High light intensity and high temperatures
Weather fleck	Ozone
