= Heterodera gambiensis =

Scientific classification
- Domain: Eukaryota
- Kingdom: Animalia
- Phylum: Nematoda
- Class: Secernentea
- Order: Tylenchida
- Family: Heteroderidae
- Genus: Heterodera
- Species: H. gambiensis

Binomial name
- Heterodera gambiensis Merny & Netscher, 1976

Species of roundworm

Heterodera gambiensis is a plant pathogenic nematode affecting pearl millet.

== See also ==
- List of pearl millet diseases
