= Heterodera canadensis =

Scientific classification
- Kingdom: Animalia
- Phylum: Nematoda
- Class: Secernentea
- Order: Tylenchida
- Family: Heteroderidae
- Genus: Heterodera
- Species: H. canadensis

Binomial name
- Heterodera canadensis Mulvey, 1979

Species of roundworm

Heterodera canadensis is a plant pathogenic nematode.
