= Heterodera carotae =

Scientific classification
- Domain: Eukaryota
- Kingdom: Animalia
- Phylum: Nematoda
- Class: Secernentea
- Order: Tylenchida
- Family: Heteroderidae
- Genus: Heterodera
- Species: H. carotae

Binomial name
- Heterodera carotae Jones, (1950)

Species of roundworm

Heterodera carotae is a plant pathogenic nematode commonly known as the carrot root nematode or carrot cyst nematode. It is found in Europe, Cyprus and India and is considered an invasive species in the United States. It causes damage to carrot crops and is very specific in its choice of hosts, only infecting Daucus carota and Daucus pulcherrima.

== Distribution ==
In Europe this nematode has been recorded in Germany, France, Portugal, Italy, Hungary, Poland, Sweden, Russia, the Czech Republic, the Netherlands, the United Kingdom and Ireland. It has also been found in India and Cyprus and at several locations in the state of Michigan in the United States of America.

== Morphology ==
The female carrot cyst nematode is white and lemon-shaped, averaging 400 μm by 300 μm, with a pair of ovaries occupying most of the body cavity. The male is threadlike, short with a rounded tail and a single testis averaging 60% of the body length. The mature cyst is lemon-shaped, white at first later becoming reddish-brown, with a distinct neck.

== Life cycle ==
Eggs are found in the cysts attached to the root systems of carrot plants and in plant debris and contaminated soil. Some hatch soon after the cyst is formed and the second stage juveniles disperse through the soil and invade young rootlets by piercing through the epidermis with their stylets. Most, however, remain in the cyst for two to three months after it has turned brown. At first the male and female juveniles look similar, both being threadlike and growing to 1.5 millimetres long. Four weeks after invasion the juveniles moult and the females become mature. An egg-sac begins to form and soon fills up with from 200 to 600 eggs. As the sac swells it bursts through the root tissues. The males move through the soil searching for females, and after fertilisation, the juveniles begin to develop inside the female's body. She dies and her cuticle hardens to become a cyst still attached to the root.

== Economic significance ==
Symptoms of infestation with this nematode include patches of the crop with reduced growth, stunted individual plants with bronzed leaves, small distorted roots, a tangled overgrowth of rootlets and the characteristic cysts. In light soils and when uncontrolled, crop losses caused by this nematode have ranged from twenty to eighty percent. The nematode can be dispersed by the transfer of contaminated soil, plant material and machinery. The dehydrated cysts remain infective in the soil or adhering to roots for up to ten years. If successive carrot crops are grown on the same site, nematode numbers can increase tenfold each year.
