= Meloidogyne acronea =

Scientific classification
- Domain: Eukaryota
- Kingdom: Animalia
- Phylum: Nematoda
- Class: Secernentea
- Order: Tylenchida
- Family: Heteroderidae
- Genus: Meloidogyne
- Species: M. acronea

Binomial name
- Meloidogyne acronea Coetzee, (1956)

Synonyms
- Hypsoperine acronea Hypsoperine (Hypsoperine) acronea

Species of roundworm

Meloidogyne acronea, the African cotton root-knot nematode or African cotton root nematode, is a plant pathogenic nematode affecting pigeonpeas. It is also an invasive species. The roots and surrounding soils of cereals, grasses, and Gossypium spp. provide habitat for this organism. M. acronea was confirmed as a potentially problematic pest of cotton, Gossypium hirsutum cv. Makoka, which was proven through pot experiments.

== See also ==
- List of pigeonpea diseases

== Sources ==
- Coetzee, V. Meloidogyne acronea, a new species of root-knot nematode. Nature. 1956 May 12;177(4515):899-900.
- Page, SLJ., & Bridge, J. (1994). The African Cotton-Root Nematode, Meloidogyne-Acronea - Its Pathogenicity and Intra-Generic Infectivity within Gossypium. Fundamental and Applied Nematology, 17(1), 67–73.
