= Heterodera rosii =

Scientific classification
- Domain: Eukaryota
- Kingdom: Animalia
- Phylum: Nematoda
- Class: Secernentea
- Order: Tylenchida
- Family: Heteroderidae
- Genus: Heterodera
- Species: H. rosii

Binomial name
- Heterodera rosii Duggan & Brennan, 1966

Species of roundworm

Heterodera rosii is a plant pathogenic nematode that attacks chickpeas.
