= Cyst nematode =

Cyst nematodes may refer to:

- Cactodera, a genus that includes the cactus cyst nematode, Cactodera cacti
- Globodera, or potato cyst nematode, a genus of roundworms that live on the roots of the plant family Solanaceae
- Heterodera, a genus of nematodes in the family Heteroderidae
