= Heterodera bifenestra =

Scientific classification
- Kingdom: Animalia
- Phylum: Nematoda
- Class: Secernentea
- Order: Tylenchida
- Family: Heteroderidae
- Genus: Heterodera
- Species: H. bifenestra

Binomial name
- Heterodera bifenestra Cooper, 1955

Synonyms
- Bidera bifenestra (Cooper) Krall & Krall, 1978; Bidera longicaudata (Seidel) Krall & Krall, 1978; Heterodera longicaudata Seidel, 1972

Species of roundworm

Heterodera bifenestra (cereal cyst nematode) is a plant pathogenic nematode, that is a causal agent of the cereal cyst nematode.

Heterodera bifenestra has been found in Sweden and Luxembourg on grass host plants.
