= Heterodera humuli =

Scientific classification
- Kingdom: Animalia
- Phylum: Nematoda
- Class: Secernentea
- Order: Tylenchida
- Family: Heteroderidae
- Genus: Heterodera
- Species: H. humuli

Binomial name
- Heterodera humuli Filipjev, 1934

Species of roundworm

Heterodera humuli is a plant pathogenic nematode, the hop cyst nematode. It is an obligate parasite and infests hop plants, Humulus lupulus.

== Description ==
The female hop cyst nematode is white and lemon-shaped with a body length of 0.3 to 0.7 mm (0.012 to 0.028 in) and a width of 0.3 to 0.6 mm (0.012 to 0.024 in). The male is transparent and vermiform with a body length 0.7 to 0.96 mm (0.028 to 0.038 in). The eggs are oval, 0.09 mm × 0.04 mm (0.0035 in × 0.0016 in) and the first two instar larvae are vermiform. The second instar larvae are mobile in damp soil and invade suitable roots. Here they develop further and become sedentary, burying their heads in cells and feeding on the cell sap. The central part of their bodies swells, and after moulting again they develop into bottle-shaped third instar larvae and then thicker lemon-shaped fourth instar larvae. At this stage they either become male or female depending on the food supply. The swollen larval bodies break out of the root and the mobile males travel through the soil while the females remain attached to the root tissues by their heads. After insemination, the females continue feeding and lay eggs. These remain inside the bodies of the females which die and turn into cysts. A single generation lasts 34 to 56 days depending on environmental conditions.

== Distribution ==
The hop cyst nematode occurs in many European countries, the U.S., Canada, South Africa and New Zealand.

== Biology ==
The optimal soil temperature for the development of this nematode in plant roots is about 25 °C (77 °F). It prefers heavy soils. The main host plant is the hop, Humulus lupulus, but the nematode can also survive in the roots of the stinging nettle, Urtica dioica. Infection with this nematode can lead to a poor quality crop and a decrease in yield of hops of 50%. Mortality in hop cuttings is higher in the presence of this nematode.

In a research study in England, cysts of H. humuli were found in every sample taken in a hop garden. The largest number occurred in the top fifteen centimetres (5.9 in) of soil but some were found at much greater depths. The numbers of second instar larvae fluctuated in a pattern which indicated that there were probably two or three generations in a growing season, each lasting about six weeks. Under controlled conditions of 20 °C (68 °F) and a sixteen-hour day, the life cycle lasted forty days and this was the optimal temperature for development. Most second stage larvae invaded hop roots at 15 °C (59 °F) but the egg hatch was greater at 20 °C (68 °F). In moist soil, the second-stage larvae survived for at least fifty four days and were still capable of invading roots and reproducing. It is uncertain how long the eggs remain viable in the cysts but in hatching trials using root diffusates of H. lupulus, Cannabis sativa, Urtica dioica, Urtica urens and Ficus sp., only the diffusate of H. lupulus had any effect on the hatching rate of the larvae.
