= Heterodera amygdali =

Scientific classification
- Domain: Eukaryota
- Kingdom: Animalia
- Phylum: Nematoda
- Class: Secernentea
- Order: Tylenchida
- Family: Heteroderidae
- Genus: Heterodera
- Species: H. amygdali

Binomial name
- Heterodera amygdali Kir'yanova & Ivanova, 1975

Species of roundworm

Heterodera amygdali is a plant pathogenic nematode native to Tajikistan.
