= Heterodera aucklandica =

Scientific classification
- Domain: Eukaryota
- Kingdom: Animalia
- Phylum: Nematoda
- Class: Secernentea
- Order: Tylenchida
- Family: Heteroderidae
- Genus: Heterodera
- Species: H. aucklandica

Binomial name
- Heterodera aucklandica Wouts & Sturhan, 1995

Species of roundworm

Heterodera aucklandica is a plant pathogenic nematode.
