= Rice cyst nematode =

Rice cyst nematode is the common name for several species of invasive plant-pathogenic nematodes:

- Heterodera elachista
- Heterodera oryzae
- Heterodera oryzicola
