= Heterodera cajani =

Pigeonpea cyst nematode

Scientific classification
- Kingdom: Animalia
- Phylum: Nematoda
- Class: Secernentea
- Order: Tylenchida
- Family: Heteroderidae
- Genus: Heterodera
- Species: H. cajani

Binomial name
- Heterodera cajani Koshi, 1967

Synonyms
- Heterodera vigni Edward & Misra, 1968

Species of roundworm

Heterodera cajani (Pigeonpea cyst nematode, Cowpea cyst nematode) is a plant pathogenic nematode affecting pigeonpeas, which is cited as an invasive species.

== See also ==
- List of pigeonpea diseases
