= Cereal cyst nematode =

Cereal cyst nematode (CCN) (syn. cereal root eelworm and oat cyst nematode) is a plant pest caused by Heterodera avenae, Heterodera bifenestra, Heterodera hordecalis, Heterodera latipons, and Heterodera gotland in the following hosts: Avena sativa, Hordeum vulgare, Secale cereale, Triticum aestivum, and × Triticosecale.
