= Hoplolaimus seinhorsti =

Scientific classification
- Domain: Eukaryota
- Kingdom: Animalia
- Phylum: Nematoda
- Class: Secernentea
- Order: Tylenchida
- Family: Hoplolaimidae
- Genus: Hoplolaimus
- Species: H. seinhorsti

Binomial name
- Hoplolaimus seinhorsti Luc, 1958

Species of roundworm

Hoplolaimus seinhorsti is a plant-pathogenic nematode affecting pigeon pea.

== See also ==
- List of pigeon pea diseases
