= List of foliage plant diseases (Cactaceae) =

This is a list of diseases of foliage plants belonging to the family Cactaceae.

== Plant Species ==
Plant Species
C	Cereus spp.	
R	Rhipsalidopsis gaertneri	Easter cactus
S	Schlumbergera cultivars	Thanksgiving cactus, Christmas cactus and many others

== Bacterial diseases ==
Bacterial diseases
Common name	Scientific name	Plants affected
Soft rot	Erwinia carotovora subsp. carotovora	C, R, S

== Fungal diseases ==
Fungal diseases
Common name	Scientific name	Plants affected
Colletotrichum stem rot	Colletotrichum gloeosporioides	Many cacti
Fusarium stem rot	Fusarium oxysporum	R, S
Helminthosporium stem rot, shattering	Bipolaris cactivora = Helminthosporium cactivorum	C, R, S

== Nematodes, parasitic ==
Nematodes, parasitic
Common name	Scientific name	Plants affected
Cactus cyst nematode	Cactodera cacti = Heterodera cacti	Many cacti

== Viral diseases ==
Viral diseases
Common name	Scientific name	Plants affected
Cactus virus X	Cactus virus X	Many cacti
