= CCN =

CCN may refer to:

== In science and technology ==
- Cement chemist notation, developed to simplify the formulas used by cement chemists
- Cereal cyst nematode, a plant disease
- Corn cyst nematode, a plant disease
- Cerebrocortical necrosis, a nutritional brain disease of cattle
- Cloud condensation nuclei
- Content centric networking, approach to computer-networking architecture
- Controlled-Controlled Not Gate (also known as a Toffoli gate), a component of a reversible computer
- Cyclomatic Complexity Number, a software metric
- CCN protein, a family of proteins
- Critical care nursing

== Organizations ==
- Cameron Chisholm Nicol, Australian architecture firm
- Camino Cristiano Nicaragüense, a Nicaraguan political party
- Caribbean Communications Network Ltd., a unit of ONE Caribbean Media Ltd. based in Trinidad and Tobago
- Chebucto Community Net in Halifax, Nova Scotia
- City College Norwich, a further education college in the United Kingdom
- Commission de la capitale nationale, Canadian Crown Corporation, known in English as the National Capital Commission, administrating federal properties in the region around Ottawa, Ontario and Gatineau/Hull, QC
- Companhia Colonial de Navegação, a former Portuguese shipping company
- Council of Churches in Namibia, an organization representing Christian churches in Namibia
- County Councils Network, the network of County Councils in England
- Covering Climate Now, a consortium of news organizations for news coverage of climate change

== Other uses ==
- Comedy Central News, a TV show on the Dutch Comedy Central
- Concours Complet National, a national eventing competition (see Concours Complet International)
- Certified Clinical Nutritionist, see Nutritionist#United States
- Railway service code for Central Coast & Newcastle Line, New South Wales, Australia
- CMS Certification Number, a system for identifying healthcare providers in the United States
