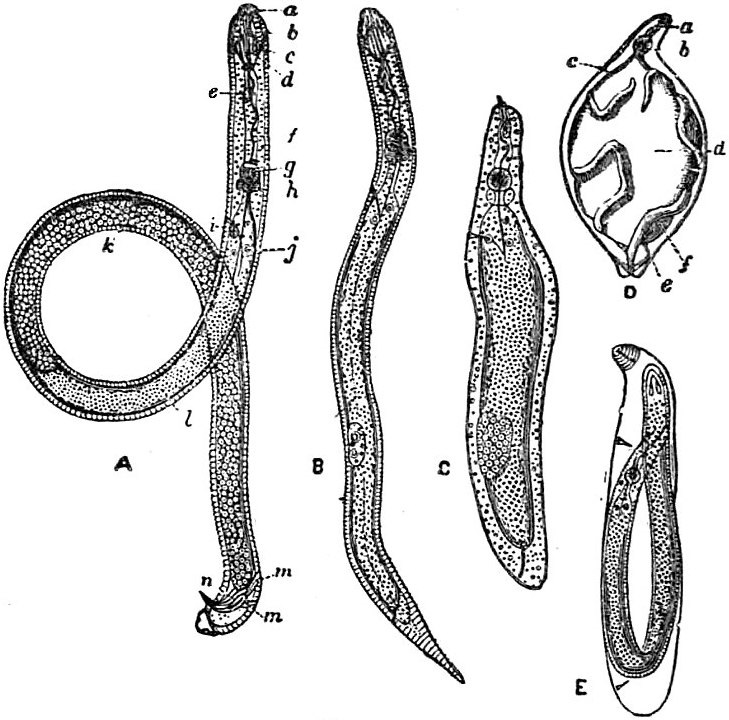

Scientific classification
- Domain: Eukaryota
- Kingdom: Animalia
- Phylum: Nematoda
- Class: Secernentea
- Order: Tylenchida
- Family: Heteroderidae
- Genus: Heterodera
- Species: H. schachtii

Binomial name
- Heterodera schachtii (A.Schmidt, 1871)

Synonyms
- Tylenchus schachtii (Schmidt, 1871) Örley, 1880; Heterobolbus schachtii (Schmidt, 1871) Railliet, 1896; Heterodera schachtii minor _{O.Schmidt, 1930}

= Heterodera schachtii =

Species of roundworm

Heterodera schachtii, the beet cyst eelworm or sugarbeet nematode, is a plant pathogenic nematode. It infects more than 200 different plants including economically important crops such as sugar beets, cabbage, broccoli, and radish. H. schachtii is found worldwide. Affected plants are marked by stunted growth, wilting, yellowing, decreased yields, and death. While there are many methods of control, crop rotation with non-susceptible plants is preferred.

== Discovery ==
In the early 1800s, "beet fatigue" was used to describe the decreased sugar beet yields which occurred after repeated planting on the same field. At first, this decrease was believed to be the result of nutrient depletion, but in 1859 the botanist H. Schacht discovered nematode cysts on the roots of affected plants and hypothesized that they were responsible for the disease. It wasn't until 1871 that another researcher, Schmidt, created the genus Heterodera, and named the nematode H. schachtii in honor of its discoverer.

== Life cycle ==
The cycle begins with eggs deposited either in a gelatinous mass or inside a cyst formed from the body of the female. The eggs become embryonated, then molt, forming the first and second larval stages. These can exist within the cyst for several years, however some will exit the cyst every year. Hatching can be stimulated by the presence of the host plant. The J2 (stage two, infective larvae) penetrate the root until they reach the vascular tissue. If the plant is suitable, the larva will release chemicals from the stylet to form a pocket of lysed cells called a syncytium. This will be the larva's food source for the rest of its life. The juveniles then go through a second, third, and fourth (final) molt. The stage 4, and later adult, female is swollen and becomes flask shaped. The male releases from the syncytium, fertilizes the attached female, and leaves the root. The females produce a gelatinous mass in which they lay some of the eggs. The rest of the eggs remain inside the female. As the feeding stops, the female dies, and her body toughens, the cuticle becoming a protective envelope for the eggs.

== Formation of syncytium ==
Heterodera schachtii modifies the host root cells and forms a hypermetabolic feeding site which nematodes withdraw nutrients from. It is assumed that this parasite manipulate the production and signaling of the host plant hormone cytokinin to activate cell division. However, the mechanism of how the cytokinin modifies host plant's cells is still unknown. It is thought that syncytium are the result of repeated mitosis since there are multiple enlarged nuclei inside the cells. These feeding sites serve as the nematode’s sole source of nutrients throughout its life cycle for several weeks.

== Economic impact ==
Because H. schachtii decreases crop yields globally, it has a significant economic impact on the agricultural industry. In 1999, H. schachtii was estimated to have cost European countries $90 million in losses for sugar beets alone. A small concentration of nematode can have a significant effect on crop yields. With just 18 eggs/gm of soil, yields of cabbage decreases by 28%. When there are more than 50 eggs/ml of soil, it is unprofitable to grow sugar beets and a crop loss of 5% is expected.

== Prevention and control ==
=== Identification ===
Stunted growth and yellowing are early signs of the disease. Infection can be confirmed by the presence of maturing cysts on plants’ roots.

=== Fumigants ===
Ethylene dibromide and metham-sodium are effective at controlling the nematode, but economic and environmental concerns generally prevent the use of fumigants as a form of control.

=== Soil suppressiveness ===
Heterodera schachtii is susceptible to infection by Verticillium suchlasporium and other fungi. When sugar beets are grown on a virgin field and a given amount of H. schachtii is introduced, beets are most vulnerable during the first several seasons. With the continued presence of the nematode in a field, infectious fungi levels rise, nematode concentrations decrease, and crop production increases. Experiments have attempted to control H. schachtii with fungi, but this method is not as economical as crop rotation.

=== Crop rotation ===
Eggs can survive within cysts for 10 or more years. However, ~40% of surviving eggs in a sessile cyst die each year. By growing non-susceptible plants for 2 or 3 years between sugar beet planting, nematode levels can be dramatically reduced. This is the primary method of control used commercially.
