= List of crucifer diseases =

This article is a list of diseases of crucifers (Brassica and Raphanus spp.).

== Bacterial diseases ==
Bacterial diseases
Bacterial leaf spot	Pseudomonas syringae pv. maculicola
Bacterial soft rot Erwinia	Erwinia carotovora
Bacterial soft rot Pseudomonas	Pseudomonas marginalis pv. marginalis
Black rot	Xanthomonas campestris pv. campestris
Crown gall	Agrobacterium tumefaciens
Xanthomonas leaf spot	Xanthomonas campestris pv. raphani

== Fungal diseases ==
Fungal diseases
Alternaria diseases: black spot (leaf, stem, or pod spots)	Alternaria spp. Alternaria brassicae Alternaria brassicicola Alternaria raphani
Anthracnose	Colletotrichum higginsianum
Black leg and Phoma root rot	Leptosphaeria maculans Phoma lingam [anamorph]
Black mold rot	Rhizopus stolonifer
Black root (Aphanomyces)	Aphanomyces raphani
Bottom rot, damping-off, headrot, seedling root rot, wire stem, and basal stem rot	Ganoderma orbiforme Rhizoctonia solani Thanatephorus cucumeris [teleomorph]
Cercospora leaf spot	Cercospora brassicicola
Clubroot	Plasmodiophora brassicae
Damping-off	Fusarium spp. Pythium spp.
Downy mildew, staghead	Peronospora parasitica
Gray mold	Botrytis cinerea Botryotinia fuckeliana [teleomorph]
Light leaf spot	Pyrenopeziza brassicae
Phymatotrichum root rot (cotton root rot)	Phymatotrichopsis omnivora = Phymatotrichum omnivorum
Phytophthora root rot	Phytophthora megasperma
Powdery mildew	Erysiphe polygoni
Ring spot	Mycosphaerella brassicicola Asteromella brassicae [anamorph]
Sclerotinia stem rot and watery soft rot	Sclerotinia sclerotiorum
Southern blight	Sclerotium rolfsii Athelia rolfsii [teleomorph]
Verticillium wilt	Verticillium albo-atrum Verticillium dahliae
White leaf spot and gray stem	Pseudocercosporella capsellae
White rust and staghead	Albugo candida (Peronospora sp. commonly present in staghead phase)
Yellows	Fusarium oxysporum

== Miscellaneous diseases and disorders ==
Miscellaneous diseases and disorders
Autogenic necrosis	Genetic disorder
Black speck	Physiological
Brown girdling root rot	Unidentified
Scab	Streptomyces S. scabies

== Nematodes, parasitic ==
Nematodes, parasitic
Awl	Dolichodorus spp.
Cyst	Heterodera schachtii Heterodera cruciferae
Lesion	Pratylenchus pratensis
Pin	Paratylenchus spp.
Root-knot	Meloidogyne spp.
Sting	Belonolaimus spp.

== Viral diseases ==
Viral diseases
Cauliflower mosaic	Cauliflower mosaic virus
Radish mosaic	Radish mosaic virus
Turnip mosaic	Turnip yellow mosaic virus
Yellows	Beet western yellows virus
