= Heterodera arenaria =

Scientific classification
- Domain: Eukaryota
- Kingdom: Animalia
- Phylum: Nematoda
- Class: Secernentea
- Order: Tylenchida
- Family: Heteroderidae
- Genus: Heterodera
- Species: H. arenaria

Binomial name
- Heterodera arenaria Cooper, 1955

Synonyms
- Bidera arenaria (Cooper, 1955) Krall' & Krall', 1978

Species of roundworm

Heterodera arenaria is a plant pathogenic nematode.
