= Heterodera latipons =

Scientific classification
- Kingdom: Animalia
- Phylum: Nematoda
- Class: Secernentea
- Order: Tylenchida
- Family: Heteroderidae
- Genus: Heterodera
- Species: H. latipons

Binomial name
- Heterodera latipons Franklin, 1969

Species of roundworm

Heterodera latipons, the Mediterranean cereal cyst nematode or wheat cyst nematode, is a plant pathogenic nematode.

== Hosts ==
Hosts include wheat, barley, oat, rye, several Phalaris spp., and Elytrigia repens.

== See also ==
- List of barley diseases
- List of oat diseases
