= Heterodera cruciferae =

Scientific classification
- Kingdom: Animalia
- Phylum: Nematoda
- Class: Secernentea
- Order: Tylenchida
- Family: Heteroderidae
- Genus: Heterodera
- Species: H. cruciferae

Binomial name
- Heterodera cruciferae Franklin, (1945)

Synonyms
- Heterodera (Heterodera) cruciferae

Species of roundworm

Heterodera cruciferae is a plant pathogenic nematode that predates on cabbages.
