= Heterodera oryzicola =

Scientific classification
- Domain: Eukaryota
- Kingdom: Animalia
- Phylum: Nematoda
- Class: Secernentea
- Order: Tylenchida
- Family: Heteroderidae
- Genus: Heterodera
- Species: H. oryzicola

Binomial name
- Heterodera oryzicola Rao & Jayaprakash, 1978

Species of roundworm

Heterodera oryzicola, the rice cyst nematode, is a plant pathogenic nematode, which is cited as an invasive species.
