= Parasitylenchidae =

Scientific classification
- Kingdom: Animalia
- Phylum: Nematoda
- Class: Secernentea
- Order: Tylenchida
- Family: Parasitylenchidae

Family of nematodes

Parasitylenchidae is a family of nematodes belonging to the order Tylenchida.

== Genera ==
Genera:

- Helionema Brzeski, 1962
- Heteromorphotylenchus Remillet & Van Waerebeke, 1978
- Heterotylenchus Bovien, 1937
