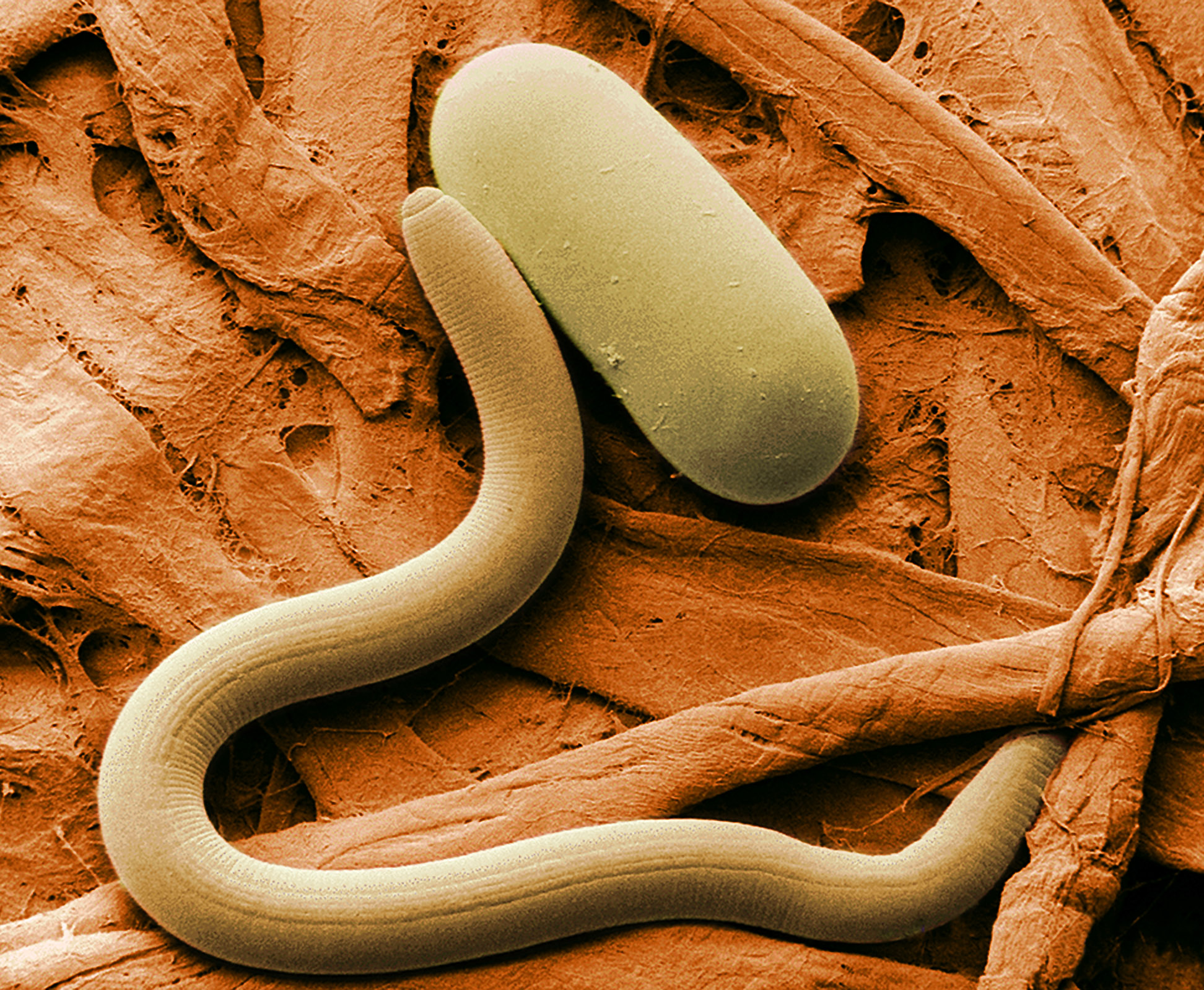
- Heterodera glycines

Scientific classification
- Domain: Eukaryota
- Kingdom: Animalia
- Phylum: Nematoda
- Class: Secernentea
- Order: Tylenchida
- Family: Heteroderidae
- Subfamily: Heteroderinae
- Genus: Heterodera; Schmidt, 1871

Species
- See § Diversity

Synonyms
- Afenestrata Baldwin & Bell, 1985

= Heterodera =

Genus of roundworms

Heterodera is a genus of nematodes in the family Heteroderidae. Members of the genus are obligate parasites and different species attack different crops, often causing great economic damage. The genus is unique among nematode genera because of the ability of the female to transform into a tough, brown, cyst which protects the eggs which have been formed within her body. The name heterodera "refers to the different 'skins' of female and cyst."

== Diversity ==
The following is a list of taxa in the genus Heterodera:

- Heterodera amygdali
- Heterodera arenaria
- Heterodera aucklandica
- Heterodera avenae
- Heterodera bergeniae
- Heterodera bifenestra
- Heterodera cacti
- Heterodera cajani
- Heterodera canadensis
- Heterodera cardiolata
- Heterodera carotae
- Heterodera ciceri
- Heterodera cruciferae
- Heterodera delvii
- Heterodera elachista
- Heterodera filipjevi
- Heterodera gambiensis
- Heterodera glycines, soybean cyst nematode
- Heterodera goettingiana
- Heterodera hordecalis
- Heterodera humuli
- Heterodera latipons
- Heterodera longicaudata
- Heterodera medicaginis, alfalfa cyst nematode
- Heterodera oryzae
- Heterodera oryzicola
- Heterodera rosii
- Heterodera sacchari
- Heterodera schachtii
- Heterodera tabacum
- Heterodera trifolii
- Heterodera ustinovi
- Heterodera zeae, corn cyst nematode

== Genetics ==
GenBank contains internal transcribed spacers sequences for the family, much of which is for this genus. Most of that has been generated by Sergei Subbotin and collaborators (Subbotin et al., 1999, Clapp et al., 2000, Subbotin et al., 2000, Zeng et al., 2000, Subbotin et al., 2001, Amiri & Subbotin 2002, Subbotin et al., 2003). Subbotin et al., 2003 suggests further analysis of this data will yield a large number of new Heterodera species.
