= Fergusobiidae =

Scientific classification
- Domain: Eukaryota
- Kingdom: Animalia
- Phylum: Nematoda
- Class: Secernentea
- Order: Tylenchida
- Family: Fergusobiidae

Family of roundworms

Fergusobiidae is a family of nematodes belonging to the order Tylenchida.

Genera:

- Fergusobia Currie, 1937
