= Heterodera oryzae =

Scientific classification
- Domain: Eukaryota
- Kingdom: Animalia
- Phylum: Nematoda
- Class: Secernentea
- Order: Tylenchida
- Family: Heteroderidae
- Genus: Heterodera
- Species: H. oryzae

Binomial name
- Heterodera oryzae Luc & Berdon, 1961

Species of roundworm

Heterodera oryzae, the rice cyst nematode, is a plant pathogenic nematode, which is cited as an invasive species.
