= Globodera ellingtonae =

Scientific classification
- Kingdom: Animalia
- Phylum: Nematoda
- Class: Chromadorea
- Order: Rhabditida
- Family: Heteroderidae
- Genus: Globodera
- Species: G. ellingtonae

Binomial name
- Globodera ellingtonae Handoo, Carta, Skantar & Chitwood 2012

Species of roundworm

Globodera ellingtonae is one of the potato cyst nematodes and was recently recognized as a new species in the United States. This triggered a quarantine of the fields where it was isolated to prevent the spread of this nematode to other fields.

== History and significance ==
Globodera ellingtonae was isolated in 2008 from a field near Powell Butte, Oregon and in two fields in Idaho. After detail morphological and molecular comparisons with G. pallida and G. rostochiensis, G. ellintonae was described as a new species.

To prevent the spread of this new species, quarantine restrictions were established. The restrictions control how the land is used so the soil is not moved by farm equipment or tillage implements to new locations.

== Distribution ==
Idaho and Oregon, USA

== History ==
In 2008, a new and different potato cyst nematode was isolated from Oregon and Idaho. The infested soil was collected from a research farm near Powell Butte, OR and from two grower fields in Idaho. The field at Powell Butt had a cropping history that included potatoes, wheat, and other crops. It also has a history of weeds problems.

The isolates were characterized both morphologically and molecularly. To do the morphological characterization the cysts were collected from soil samples, juveniles were hatched from cysts, and the specimens were fixed, measured, and photographed by Stantar et al. After completing all the physical measurements of juveniles and cysts the new nematode species differed from G. pallida and G. rostochiensis because of the constriction on the tails of the J2’s, pattern of ridges on the cysts and the number of ridges between the vulva and the anal area, stylet length, and the spicules.

The molecular characterization was done by several molecular methods which include sequence-specific multiplex PCR, PCR-RFLP of ITS1 and – rDNA sequences. DNA was purified, amplified, and the PCR products cloned.

The isolates used for molecular comparison are listed and consists of isolates collected around the world. The new nematode population was compared to G. rostochiensis, G. pallida, G. tabacum, and G. mexicana. Analysis of the ITS rDNA sequences shows that the Globodera population isolated from Oregon and Idaho is in a different grouping than G. rostochiensis and G. pallida. The Globodera sp. fell into the same group as G. ellingtonae isolates from Antofagasta Chile. Due to the lack of morphological measurements of the isolates from South America to go with the molecular results from the US isolates the taxonomic characterization is missing that comparison.

In 2017 a genome sequence for G. ellingtonae was published.

== Regulatory restrictions ==
Due to quarantine restrictions imposed on any new pathogen, G. ellingtonae, has been restricted to the field in Oregon and the two grower fields in Idaho. G. ellingtonae is a restricted pathogen due its initial introduction into the US. Introduced pathogens are under strict regulatory conditions that prevent the spread of the nematode to new fields. APHIS sampled 300,000 additional fields in Idaho and 100,000 fields in other states and no additional G. ellingtonae cysts were found.

== Life cycle ==
Globodera species are migratory semi-endoparasites. The nematode starts out as an egg and hatches into a second stage juvenile. The females move to roots and set up a feeding site whereas the males do not feed. When sexually mature after the fourth molt the males fertilize the female which results in eggs and development of the cyst. Depending on the temperature the life cycle completes in 38 to 48 days. The cysts can remain viable for 30 years.

== Host parasite relationship ==
- Potato
- Kangaroo Apple
- European Bitter-Sweet
- Tomato – tree tomato, currant tomato
- Henbane
- Jimson weed (Devil’s Trumpet)
- Goosefoot
- Eastern black nightshade
- Common Snapdragon
- Quinoa
- Painted Tongue
- Wood Sorrel
- Morelle
- Pepino
- Eggplant
- Horse nettle
- Sunberry

== Management ==
Due to the regulated status of G. ellingtonae the land where the nematode was found is under quarantine to prevent additional spread.

Researchers are looking at trap crops like sticky nightshade, Solanum sisymbriifolium in Europe. Trap crops produce egg hatching compounds that cause eggs to hatch but don’t make good hosts and the juveniles are unable to set up a feeding site. This results in the decline of the egg inoculum in the soil.

Another way to utilize this research is to synthetically produce the compounds produced by trap crop. Up to 10 different compounds have been identified as contributing to the egg hatching factor. If these compounds can be produced and delivered to infested fields this would contribute the depletion of cyst nematode eggs.
