= H. arenaria =

H. arenaria may refer to:

- Hemicycliophora arenaria, a plant pathogenic nematode species
- Heterodera arenaria, a plant pathogenic nematode species

== See also ==
- Arenaria (disambiguation)
