= Heterodera elachista =

Scientific classification
- Domain: Eukaryota
- Kingdom: Animalia
- Phylum: Nematoda
- Class: Secernentea
- Order: Tylenchida
- Family: Heteroderidae
- Genus: Heterodera
- Species: H. elachista

Binomial name
- Heterodera elachista Ohshima, 1974

Species of roundworm

Heterodera elachista, the Japanese cyst nematode or rice cyst nematode, is a plant pathogenic nematode, which is cited as an invasive species.
