= Iotonchiidae =

Scientific classification
- Kingdom: Animalia
- Phylum: Nematoda
- Class: Secernentea
- Order: Tylenchida
- Family: Iotonchiidae

Family of roundworms

Iotonchiidae is a family of nematodes belonging to the order Tylenchida.

Genera:

- Fungiotonchium Siddiqi, 1986
- Iotonchium Cobb, 1920
- Paraiotonchium Slobodyanyuk, 1975
- Skarbilovinema Chizhov & Zakharenkova, 1991
