= Cactodera cacti =

Scientific classification
- Kingdom: Animalia
- Phylum: Nematoda
- Class: Secernentea
- Order: Tylenchida
- Family: Heteroderidae
- Genus: Cactodera
- Species: C. cacti

Binomial name
- Cactodera cacti (Filipjev & Schuurmans Stekhoven, 1941)

Species of roundworm

Cactodera cacti, also known as the cactus cyst nematode or cactus cyst eelworm, is a plant pathogenic nematode. It is a pest of plants in the families Cactaceae, Apiaceae, and Euphorbiaceae.

== History ==
Cactodera cacti was first discovered in 1932 affecting various species of cactus. It gained wider attention after it appeared in Belle Glade, Florida in the 1960s when it was discovered to have infected the roots of celery plants in greenhouses. It was believed that the parasite had spread due to the popular demand of cactus plants in gardens allowing the nematodes to easily spread to the other plants in the greenhouses. In 2012, there were reports of C. cacti emerging in various greenhouses across parts of Northern China.

== Distribution ==
In the United States the cactus cyst has been reported in Arkansas, California, Colorado, Florida, Georgia, Minnesota, and New York. It also ranges across parts of South America, Central America, Europe, and Asia.

As C. cacti feeds off the roots of plants they mainly target plant species with either fine root systems, like cactus and succulents, or taproot plants that store large amounts of nutrients within their roots, like carrots, parsley, and celery.

== Life cycle ==
Cactodera cacti reproduces sexually, although there is evidence that it is also able to reproduce asexually. Females develop eggs within a tough protective cyst which is formed from the body of the female nematode via a process of polyphenol tanning. Each cyst will contain hundreds of eggs and the cysts protect these eggs until they hatch. The eggs can survive without food or water for up to 30 years. The eggs hatch into juvenile nematodes. These juveniles will migrate to roots of a suitable host and remain in the roots of the plant. The nematode will feed from the root whilst they go through their remaining three juvenile stages before moulting into the adult form. Upon maturation the adult female will develop the eggs inside her before dying and forming the protective cyst.

== Symptoms and signs ==
Plants that are infected with C. cacti often show signs of dying such as yellowing or dying leaves, wilting, stunted growth, and reduced flower production. Because the parasite attacks the roots of the plant it can also lead to root rot and allow for other parasites and various fungi to infest the plant as well.

== Prevention ==
The best method to treat nematode infested crops is the rotation of crops by season, as the nematode will not survive without a suitable host. For potted plants or greenhouses it is recommended the soil be changed out or that the roots of the plant be culled before being re-potted into clean soil.

== Impact ==
Cactodera cacti is not significantly important in regards of an economic loss but can prove problematic in greenhouses, nurseries, and home gardens. In Mexico where cactus plants are often used for food production C. cacti infestations can cause problems for local food production.
