= Globodera tabacum =

Scientific classification
- Domain: Eukaryota
- Kingdom: Animalia
- Phylum: Nematoda
- Class: Secernentea
- Order: Tylenchida
- Family: Heteroderidae
- Genus: Globodera
- Species: G. tabacum

Binomial name
- Globodera tabacum Lownsbery and Lownsbery, (1954)

Species of nematode

Globodera tabacum, commonly known as a tobacco cyst nematode, is a plant parasitic nematode that mainly infests the tobacco plant, but also plants in family Solanaceae.

== History and significance ==
The tobacco cyst nematode, Globodera tabacum, is a serious and important soil borne parasite of the shade and broadleaf tobacco. The most important host plant for this nematode is tobacco (Nicotiana tabacum L), but other hosts include tomato, eggplant and closely related solanaceous weeds. This species of nematodes was first discovered in Hazardville, Connecticut in the 1950s. Nematode infection of the tobacco root system causes dramatic stunting, yield loss and decreases leaf quality.

== Distribution ==
Globodera subspecies are distributed as follows (older data): Globodera tabacum tabacum – Connecticut and Massachusetts. Globodera tabacum solanacearum - Virginia and North Carolina. Globodera tabacum virginiae – Virginia, Mexico and Central America. As of 1998, Globodera tabacum tabacum has been reported in Canada as well.

== Morphology ==
Head has four head annules, lip region is well-developed, oral disk is present and the entire head region is heavily sclerotized. The stylet has three rounded knobs while tail is pointy and rounded at the very tip. There are a total of six lips, four large and two small.

== Host – parasite relationship ==
The tobacco cyst nematode is a sedentary semi-endoparasite of the roots. Its feeding site and feeding patterns are typical of the genus Globodera. Nurse cell is a multinucleate syncytium. Tobacco cyst nematode causes significant damage on tobacco root system mainly by intracellular migration. This damage is caused both by mechanical penetration as well as with the enzyme secretions. Syncytium is formed in pericycle and endodermal cells of the plant. Unlike root-knot nematodes, the tobacco cyst nematode does not form feeding tubes enveloped in an endoplasmatic reticulum. Due to lack of enzymes that cause hypertrophy and hyperplasia, there is no galling observed.

== Life cycle/ Reproduction ==
The life cycle is typical of plant parasitic nematodes. This means that Globodera tabacum nematode has four juvenile stages, molts four times and then finally reaches adult stage. The duration of its life cycle is speculated to be temperature dependent. Hatching is often initiated by root exudate.

== Taxonomy ==
Even though there are some disagreements among scientists on Globodera tabacum taxonomy, it is believed that this complex consists of three subspecies: subspecies solanacearum, subspecies tabacum and subspecies virginiae. Mugniéry et al. (1992) confirmed hybridization between all three entities but these groups vary greatly in their capacity to damage tobacco.

== Management ==
Management practices consist of crop rotation, planting resistant cultivars and general soil maintenance and hygiene. Chemical control is an option but it is not widely used in USA against Globodera tabacum spp. virginiae, but only against other two subspecies. The use of 1,3 Dichloropropene as soil fumigant is in process of being phased out in EU. Using trap crop has been suggested by some authors as a possible way of controlling this nematode.
