= List of pocketbook plant diseases =

This article is a list of diseases of pocketbook plants (Calceolaria crenatiflora).

== Bacterial diseases ==
Bacterial diseases
| Bacterial leaf spot | Pseudomonas syringae |

== Fungal diseases ==
Fungal diseases
| Botrytis blight | Botrytis cinerea |
| Myrothecium root and crown rot | Myrothecium roridum |
| Phytophthora root and stem rot | Phytophthora spp. |
| Pythium root rot | Pythium ultimum Pythium mastophorum |
| Sclerotinia blight | Sclerotinia sclerotiorum |
| Verticillium wilt | Verticillium albo-atrum |
