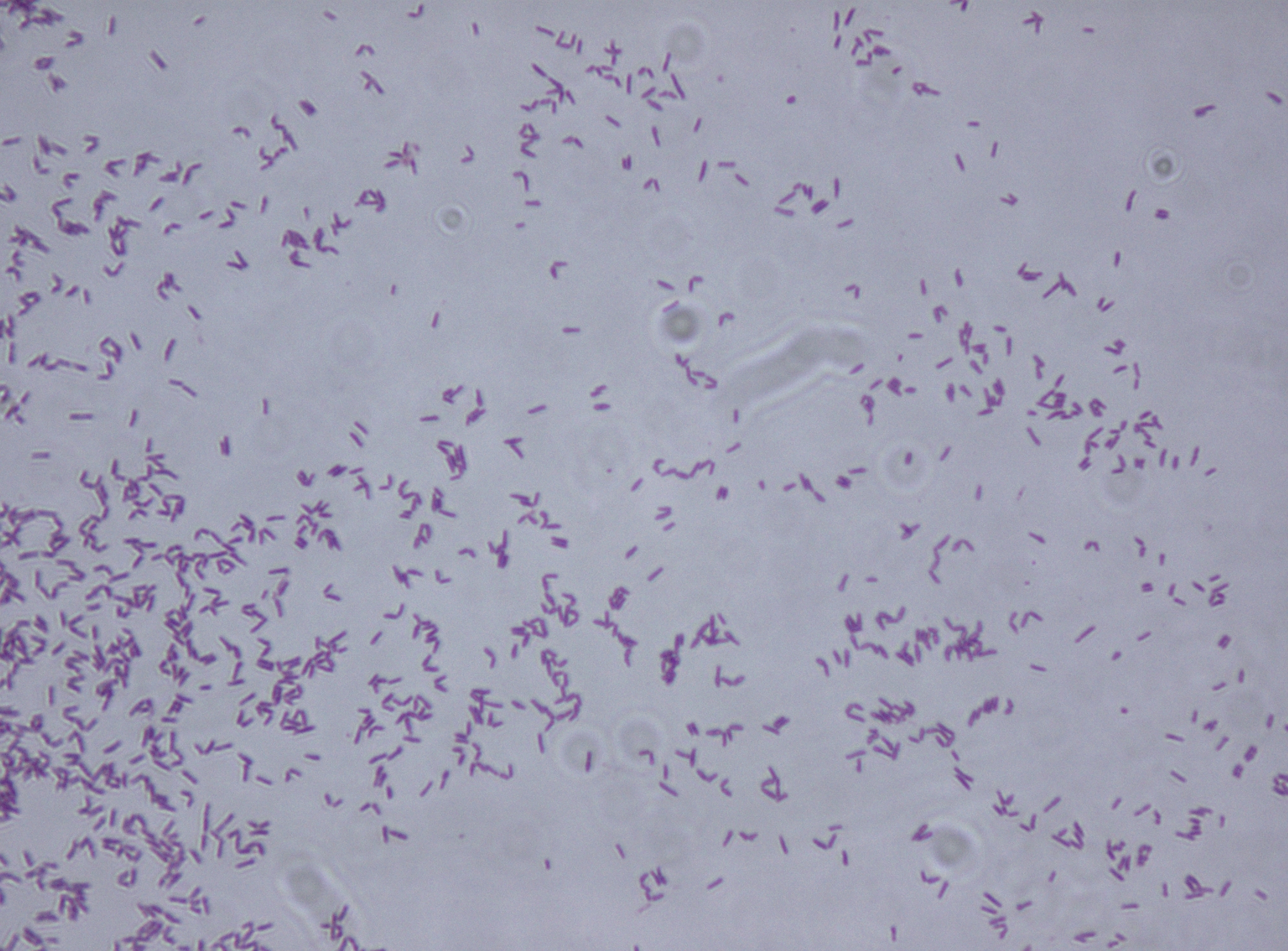

Scientific classification
- Domain: Bacteria
- Kingdom: Bacillati
- Phylum: Actinomycetota
- Class: Actinomycetes
- Order: Mycobacteriales
- Family: Nocardiaceae
- Genus: Rhodococcus
- Species: R. fascians

Binomial name
- Rhodococcus fascians (Tilford 1936) Goodfellow 1984

= Rhodococcus fascians =

Species of bacterium

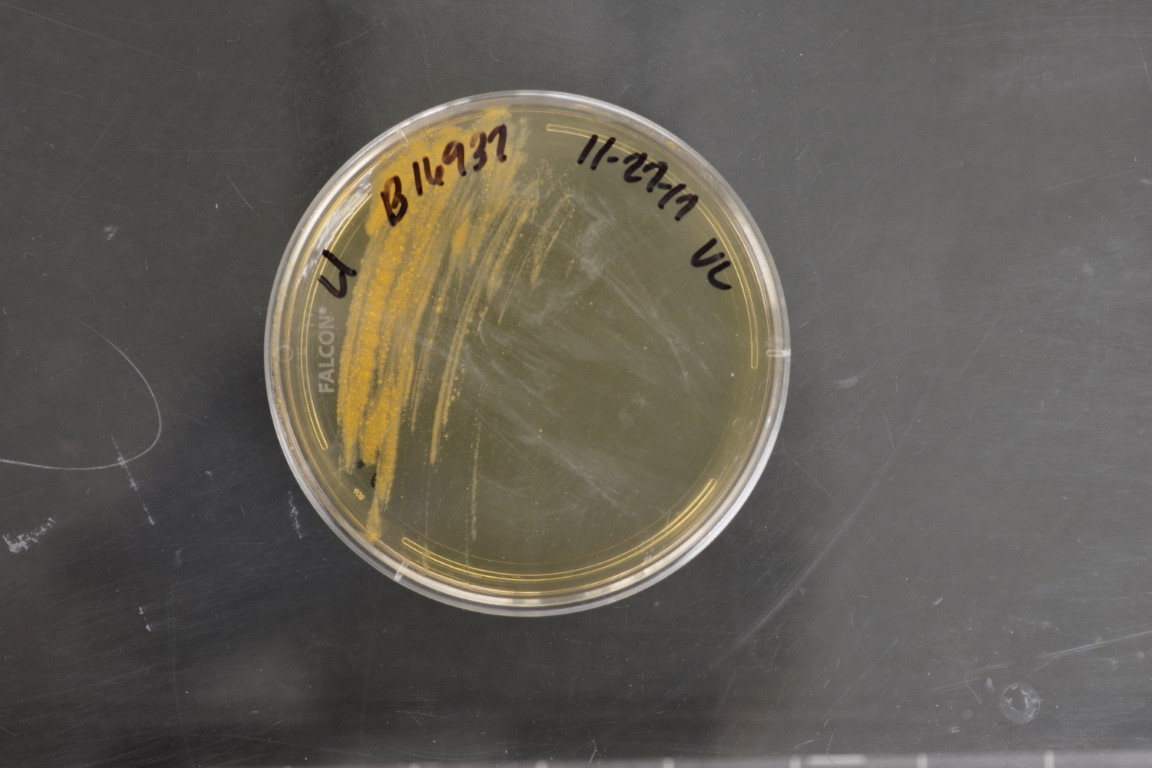
Rhodococcus fascians on agar plate

Rhodococcus fascians (known as Corynebacterium fascians until 1984) is a Gram positive bacterial phytopathogen that causes leafy gall disease. R. fascians is the only phytopathogenic member of the genus Rhodococcus; its host range includes both dicotyledonous and monocotyledonous hosts. Because it commonly afflicts tobacco (Nicotiana) plants, it is an agriculturally significant pathogen.

== Physiology and morphology ==
R. fascians is an aerobic, pleiomorphic bacterium of the actinomycetes that is nonmotile and does not form spores. When grown on the surface of an agar plate, colonies are orange in color and appear both smooth or rough.

== Virulence ==
R. fascians can be a pathogen of plants, both angiosperm or gymnosperm. Infected plants show typical symptoms, such as leaf deformation, witches broom and leaf gall, which development depends on the plant's cultivar, plant's age, and the bacterial strain.

Leaf deformation consists of widening of parenchyma and growth of vascular system, resulting in wrinkling of laminae and widening of veins. Leafy gall is a gall originated from a bud which would not develop under normal conditions. All effects coming from the infection of R. fascians do not depend on plant cells' transformation (as they do in Agrobacterium tumefaciens or Agrobacterium rhizogenes), but on expression of virulence-related genes of bacterium and on the production of compounds that can interfere with normal plant growth and development. During the infection, R. fascians usually stays outside vegetal tissues, near a junction or cavity of a plant's cell walls, maybe to avoid environmental stresses. Presence of R. fascians was also observed in intercellular spaces inside tissues (in leaf or galls) and even inside cell walls. Presence of R. fascians on the infected plant is necessary, not only for the initiation of infection, but also for its maintenance.

=== Virulence genes ===
Virulence in R. fascians is controlled by genes on a plasmid (strains lacking that plasmid are not virulent) and on the chromosome. Using deletion mutations, it was possible to identify three loci on the plasmid: fas, att, and hyp, and one locus on the chromosome, vic.

The fas is an operon made of six genes (orf 1-6) and a regulatory gene, fasR. Because deletions of some fas genes give a non-virulent phenotype, for fas a main role in virulence was proposed . Gene fasR is an araC-like transcriptional regulator. Its transcription can be induced in vitro in cultures containing certain carbon sources (such as glucose, sucrose, arabinose, glycerol, pyruvate, mannitol, mannose) or nitrogen sources (such as histidine), and is influenced by culture pH and optical density. Also, fasR can be induced by gall extract created by virulent strain. The operon codifies for genes involved in cytokinin synthesis and degradation (orf 4,5,6), in particular for an isopentenyl transferase, a cytokinin oxidase and a glutation-s transferase. The orf1,2,3 transcribe for a cytochrome 450, a ferridoxine containing also a pyruvate dehydrogenase alfa-like domain and a pyruvate dehydrogenase beta subunit. It was supposed that the first three genes supply energy for the synthesis and degradation of cytokinin, performed by the last three genes of the operon: R. fascians can actually produce and degrade zeatin and isopentenil adenine. The compound cytokin oxidase (orf4) can also create adenine with a reactive nitrogen in position 6, which can react with other lateral chains, to form cytokininn-like compounds, more efficient in inducing plant tissue growth.

The att is an operon composed of nine genes: attR, a transcriptional regulator, attX, a gene including domains for transmembrane localization (perhaps needed for exportation of compounds made by other att genes), and several genes attA-attH. Many point and Δatt mutants show an attenuated virulence.

Gene attR is a transcriptional factor including a helix-turn-helix motif. Its transcription is regulated by the same factors that regulate fasR transcription, but with a higher intensity, suggesting, with the attenuation of virulence in att mutants, that att may regulate fas transcription. Transcription of att operon is regulated with a quorum-sensing mechanism: indeed, density of cultures can influence transcription of attR, and leafy gall extracts coming from galls made by att mutant strains are less effective on transcription of attR.

Genes attA-attH may be involved in synthesis of compounds needed for transcription of attR and attX. In fact, attA, attD & attH are involved in betalactamase synthesis, but no traces of those compounds were found in culture supernatants.

The hyp codifies for an RNA-helicase; mutants for this gene are hypervirulent. Also, hyp is involved in post transcriptional control of virulence-related genes, maybe on fas products.

Operon vic is an operon made of five genes, located on the bacterial chromosome. The only known gene is vicA, the fourth gene in the operon, whose product is a Mas homologue, a protein needed for the switch from citric acid cycle to glyoxylate cycle, both for metabolic reasons and to avoid glyoxylate accumulation, which is toxic for the bacteria. Mutations in vicA reduce virulence due to incapacity of R. fascians to resist glyoxylate accumulation.

=== Induction of transcription in infected plant ===
In tobacco, infection of R. fascians leads to hyperexpression of a cytochrome P450, homologue to a gene involved in inactivation of abscisic acid in Arabidopsis thaliana, of a gibberellic acid oxidase, which inactivates this hormone and its precursors, a proline dehydrogenase, which has its transcription induced by cytokinin and turns proline into glutamic acid, and a factor involved in molybdenum cofactor, needed for sulfur, carbon and nitrogen metabolism control and for abscisic acid synthesis.

=== Role of phytohormones during infection ===
All the effects of R. fascians infection can be attributed to hormone hyperdosage. In particular, most of the effects are connected to auxin and cytokinin, such as: formation of green islands on leaves, wrinkling of laminae, bud proliferation, delay of senescence, and inhibition of lateral roots. In fact, R. fascians can produce itself cytokinin, or cytokinin-like compounds: using orf4 and orf5 in the fas operon, it can stimulate infected plants to produce cytokinin, and it can produce indole-3-acetic acid itself, using a pathway starting from tryptophan and passing through production of 3-indol-piruvic acid and 3-indol-acetaldeid. R.fascians can also degrade cytokinin to influence the cytokinin/auxin ratio.

Beside cytokinin and auxin, R. fascians acts on other hormones: in particular, it can block abscisic acid and gibberellic acid synthesis in infected plants. Abscisic acid represses growth, so a block of production is needed to allow proliferation of cells in leafy galls. Gibberellic acid controls cellular differentiation, so its block is needed for maintenance of meristematic cells and for their proliferation.

== Plant diseases ==
R. fascians causes diseases in several host plants including tobacco, small fruits (caneberries, strawberries) and ornamental plants (butterfly flowers, Primula, kalanchoes, Impatiens, geraniums, carnations)
