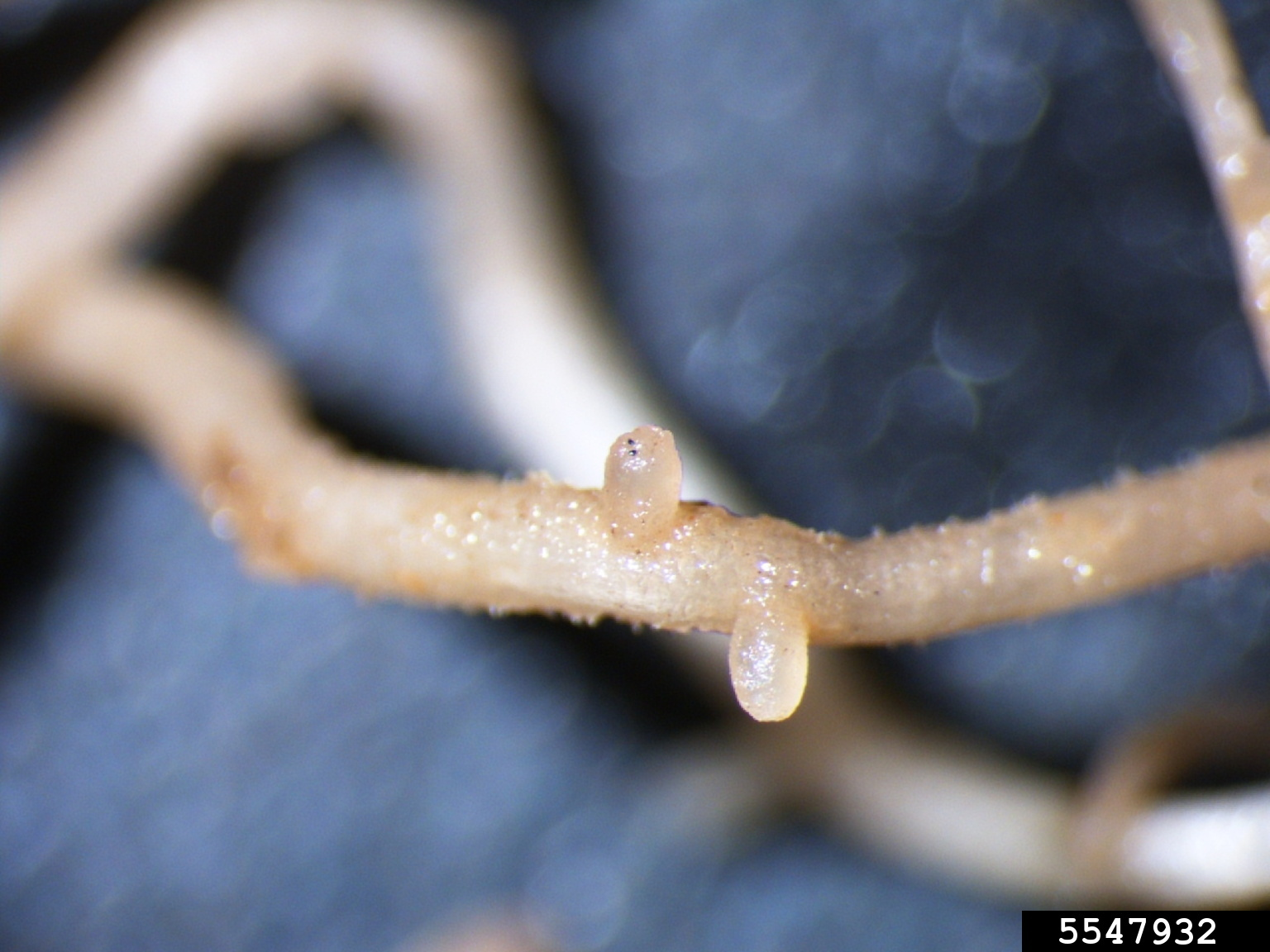

Scientific classification
- Kingdom: Animalia
- Phylum: Nematoda
- Class: Chromadorea
- Order: Rhabditida
- Family: Heteroderidae
- Genus: Heterodera
- Species: H. avenae

Binomial name
- Heterodera avenae Wollenweber, 1924

Synonyms
- Bidera avenae (Wollenweber) Krall & Krall, 1978; Bidera ustinovi (Kirjanova) Krall & Krall, 1978; Heterodera schachtii major O.Schmidt, 1930; Heterodera ustinovi Kirjanova, 1969; Heterodera schachtii var. avenae (Wollenweber, 1924); Heterodera schachtii subsp. maior (O. Schmidt, 1930); Heterodera maior (O. schmidt, 1930) Franklin, 1940; Heterodera schachtii var. avenae (Mortensen, Rostrup & Kolpen Ravn, 1908)

= Heterodera avenae =

Cereal cyst nematode (CCN)

Species of roundworm

Heterodera avenae, the cereal cyst nematode or European cyst nematode, is a plant pathogen and an obligate parasite of cereal crops including barley, oats, wheat and rye. Cereal crops infected with this nematode are more susceptible to infection by fungal diseases such as rhizoctonia root rot.

== Life cycle ==
This microscopic nematode exhibits sexual dimorphism. The female is rounded and white and measures 680 by 930 micrometres. The male is vermiform and transparent and measures 40 by 1300 micrometres. The eggs are oval and the vermiform larvae moult four times. The second instar larvae are mobile and can travel distances of up to thirty centimetres, looking for and invading roots of suitable host species. Here they develop, growing into sedentary bottle-shaped third instar larvae and rounded fourth instar ones. These then develop into either females or males and mating takes place. The female retains the majority of the several hundred eggs she produces inside her body. She turns into a brown cyst by the end of plant growth season, as her external surface hardens and her internal parts die. The larvae may remain in anabiosis within this cyst for several years until suitable host plants become available. The cysts can withstand harsh conditions and can be spread in soil, by agricultural machinery, by animals, by wind, by dust storms or other means.

== Economic significance ==
Infection with cereal cyst nematode is associated with a reduction in grain yield which may be of significant proportions. Thresholds of harmfulness depend on the population density of the nematode and differ among various cultivars and varieties. The weather conditions and soil types are also an important factor, with infections being increased in damp, warm growing seasons. The symptoms of infection include stunting and yellowing of the visible parts of the plant which may give the crop an uneven appearance. The presence of the disease can be established by inspecting the root system of plants and looking for abnormal development. The roots of infested plants develop a tangle of branches and swellings which are white when young but turn dark brown with age. It is the seedlings of cereals that are most readily infected with this nematode and damaged roots are often invaded by soil-borne pathogens such as root and crown rots. When nematode populations are high, significant losses in yield can occur. All wheat varieties are susceptible but some cultivars do not support cyst formation. It was found in trials that direct-drilling that did not disturb the soil below seeding depth reduced the incidence of cereal cyst nematode but did not have the same effect on the other serious cereal seedling diseases of rhizoctonia root rot and take-all. Control is by crop rotation, fallowing and the use of less susceptible varieties.
