= Heterodera zeae =

Corn cyst nematode

Scientific classification
- Kingdom: Animalia
- Phylum: Nematoda
- Class: Chromadorea
- Order: Rhabditida
- Family: Heteroderidae
- Genus: Heterodera
- Species: H. zeae

Binomial name
- Heterodera zeae Koshy, Swarup, and Sethi 1970

Species of roundworm

Heterodera zeae, the corn cyst nematode (CCN), is a plant parasitic nematode that feeds on Zea mays (maize/corn). The CCN has a limited economic impact worldwide due to its high soil temperature requirements.

== History ==
CCN was first described from a population in Udaipur, India in 1970 by Koshy and his co-workers. It was later reported in Egypt and Pakistan. In India the CCN is considered to be one of the four economically important cyst nematodes. The first report of the species in the Western hemisphere came in 1981 from four colonies in Maryland, Harford, Cecil, Kent, and Queen Anne's counties. These four counties were placed under quarantine. The nematode was later identified from Cumberland Co., VA, over 170 miles from the nearest known infested field in Maryland. In Virginia the nematode was restricted to a 3 by 2.5 mile strip of land along the Appomattox River.

== Description ==
The cysts of CCN are light brown in color and lemon shaped. The cysts also have a zig-zag pattern on the cyst wall with four prominent finger-like bullae below the underbridge. The juveniles have an average stylet length of 20 μm and have a thin finely pointed tail. Females have a vulva slit of approximately 33 μm.

== Distribution and economic importance ==
The CCN has been found in India, Pakistan, Egypt, and the United States. In India and Egypt it is considered to be of economic importance. In the United States it is not considered to be of economic importance due to its limited distribution and high soil temperature requirements for reproduction. Surveys have found the nematode in four Maryland counties and one county in Virginia. However, extensive surveys from 2004 to 2011 failed to identify H. zeae from New Jersey, Florida, Wisconsin, Minnesota, South Dakota, North Dakota, and Idaho.

== Reproduction & Life Cycle ==
The life cycle of the CCN is similar to other cyst nematodes in the genus Heterodera. Individuals begin as eggs contained within a cyst, the hardened body of a dead female. Juveniles complete the molt from first stage to second stage within the egg, and it is the second stage juvenile or J2, which hatches from the egg. The J2 will seek out the roots of a suitable host plant and penetrate the root in search of a feeding site. The J2 will establish a permanent feeding site known as a syncytium and progress to adulthood. Males have not been described, but are assumed to exist. Female development is highly temperature dependent with development being minimal at 75 °F and steadily increasing in rate from 80 °F to 97 °F. The optimal developmental temperature is ≥ 97 °F, which is considered high for cyst nematodes. In the greenhouse females will produce around 150 eggs when developing on corn. Upon completion of their life adult females will darken in color and become hardened forming protective cysts, which contain their eggs.

== Host-parasite relationship ==
The CCN is known to be capable of parasitizing and reproducing on 42 different members of the plant family Poaceae. These include the economically important crops of oat, barley, rice, sorghum, and wheat. Corn is the preferred host with reproduction on corn far exceeding the other crops.

The CCN is a sedentary endoparasitic nematode, establishing feeding sites in the roots of host plants near the vascular tissue. Like other cyst nematodes, CCN feeds from a specialized feeding site known as a syncytium. This feeding site is formed by the deterioration of cell walls of adjoining plant cells in response to elicitors delivered through the nematode's stylet. This cell wall deterioration leads to the formation of a single multi-nucleated feeding cell. Through the diversion of nutrients to the syncytium, CCN can stunt corn plant growth and reduce yield.

== Management ==
The CCN is currently not considered an economically important pest of corn in the United States. If CCN reaches damaging levels crop rotation to non-host crops would be a viable management option as the CCN's host range is limited to grasses and its non-hosts include soybean, alfalfa, and cotton. It has been reported that temperature may influence the susceptibility of poor host plants to infection by H.zeae. At 15 and 23 degrees Celsius the J2's of H.zeae penetrated maize roots but failed to penetrate roots of wheat however, penetration and development on corn and wheat roots was similar at 32 degrees Celsius. Different cultivars of wheat and oats failed to support the reproduction of H.zeae under temperature ranges from 11-22 degrees Celsius however, when the temperature was increased to 33 degrees Celsius in the growth chamber slight nematode reproduction was observed. If CCN is a concern monitoring soil temperatures and alternate hosts and potential host crops may be beneficial. Host plant resistant corn lines have been found and could be used to develop resistant hybrids if needed.
