= List of impatiens diseases =

This article is a list of diseases of Impatiens species, such as Busy Lizzie (I. walleriana).

== Bacterial diseases ==
Bacterial diseases
Bacterial fasciation	Rhodococcus fascians
Pseudomonas leaf spot	Pseudomonas syringae

== Fungal diseases ==
Fungal diseases
Botrytis blight	Botrytis cinerea
Cercospora leaf spot	Cercospora apii
Fusarium root and crown rot	Fusarium sp.
Impatiens downy mildew	Plasmopara obducens
Myrothecium leaf spot	Myrothecium roridum
Phyllosticta leaf spot	Phyllosticta sp.
Phytophthora root rot	Phytophthora sp.
Powdery mildew	Erysiphaceae spp.
Pythium root rot	Pythium aphanidermatum Pythium debaryanum Pythium irregulare Pythium paroecandrum Pythium spinosum Pythium ultimum
Rhizoctonia root and stem rot	Rhizoctonia solani
Southern blight	Sclerotium rolfsii
Verticillium wilt	Verticillium albo-atrum

== Nematodes, parasitic ==
Nematodes, parasitic
Root-knot nematode	Meloidogyne arenaria

== Viral and viroid diseases ==
v diseases
Cucumber mosaic	genus Cucumovirus, Cucumber mosaic virus (CMV)
Helenium S	genus Carlavirus, Helenium S virus (HVS)
Impatiens necrotic spot	genus Tospovirus, Impatiens necrotic spot virus (INSV)
Potexvirus, unnamed	genus Potexvirus
Tobacco streak	genus Ilarvirus, Tobacco streak virus (TSV)
Tomato spotted wilt	genus Tospovirus, Tomato spotted wilt virus (TSWV)
