= Solanum acaule =

Scientific classification
- Kingdom: Plantae
- Clade: Tracheophytes
- Clade: Angiosperms
- Clade: Eudicots
- Clade: Asterids
- Order: Solanales
- Family: Solanaceae
- Genus: Solanum
- Species: S. acaule

Binomial name
- Solanum acaule Bitter

Synonyms
- List: Solanum acaule var. caulescens Bitter; Solanum acaule var. checcae Hawkes; Solanum acaule f. incuyo Ochoa; Solanum acaule var. punae (Juz.) Hawkes; Solanum acaule subsp. punae (Juz.) Hawkes & Hjert.; Solanum acaule var. subexinterruptum Bitter; Solanum depexum Juz.; Solanum depexum var. chorruense Hawkes; Solanum punae Juz.; Solanum schreiteri Bukasov; Solanum uyunense Cárdenas

Species of flowering plant

Solanum acaule is a species of wild potato in the family Solanaceae, native to Peru, Bolivia, northern Chile, and northwestern Argentina. It is being extensively studied for its resistance to Phytophthora infestans (the cause of late potato blight), Potato leafroll virus, Potato virus X, Potato virus Y, potato cyst nematodes, and frost, in an effort to improve the domestic potato Solanum tuberosum.

== Chloroplast genome ==
The complete chloroplast genome of S. acaule was constructed by de novo assembly using Illumina paired-end (PE) sequencing data. The chloroplast genome of S. acaule is circular and has a length of 155,570 bp and typical quadripartite consisting of 86,020 bp of large single copy, 18,364 bp of small single copy, and 25,593 bp of a pair of inverted repeat regions. A total of 158 genes were annotated including 105 protein-coding genes, 45 tRNA genes, and eight rRNA genes. Maximum likelihood phylogenetic analysis of the sequence with 31 species in the Solanaceae revealed that S. acaule is fully resolved in a large clade with nine other Solanum species including S. tuberosum.
