= List of Jerusalem cherry diseases =

This article is a list of diseases of the Jerusalem cherry (Solanum pseudocapsicum).

== Fungal diseases ==
Fungal diseases
Alternaria leaf spot	Alternaria solani
Anthracnose	Colletotrichum sp.
Botrytis blight	Botrytis cinerea
Phyllosticta leaf spot	Phyllosticta dulcamarae
Phyllosticta leaf spot	Phyllosticta pseudocapsici
Phytophthora root and crown rot	Phytophthora parasitica
Powdery mildew	Leveillula taurica
Pythium root rot	Pythium ultimum
Rhizoctonia root and crown rot	Rhizoctonia solani
Southern blight	Sclerotium rolfsii
Stemphylium leaf spot	Stemphylium solani
Verticillium wilt	Verticillium albo-atrum

== Nematodes, parasitic ==
Nematodes, parasitic
Cyst nematode	Heterodera tabacum
Root knot nematode	Meloidogyne arenaria Meloidogyne incognita Meloidogyne javanica

== Viral and viroid diseases ==
Viral and viroid diseases
Cucumber mosaic	genus Cucumovirus, Cucumber mosaic virus (CMV)
Impatiens necrotic spot	genus Tospovirus, Impatiens necrotic spot virus (INSV)
Tobacco mosaic	genus Tobamovirus, Tobacco mosaic virus (TMV)
Tomato spotted wilt	genus Tospovirus, Tomato spotted wilt virus (TSWV)
