= List of butterfly flower diseases =

This is a list of diseases of Butterfly Flower (Schizanthus × wisetonensis).

== Bacterial diseases ==
Bacterial diseases
Bacterial fasciation	Rhodococcus fascians
Bacterial soft rot	Erwinia carotovora subsp. carotovora = Pectobacterium carotovorum subsp. carotovorum
Crown gall	Agrobacterium tumefaciens

== Fungal diseases ==
Fungal diseases
Anthracnose	Colletotrichum gloeosporioides
Ascochyta leaf spot	Ascochyta sp.
Botrytis blight	Botrytis cinerea
Phytophthora root rot	Phytophthora cactorum Phytophthora cinnamomi Phytophthora cryptogea
Rhizoctonia root and crown rot	Rhizoctonia solani

== Nematodes, parasitic ==
Nematodes, parasitic
Foliar nematodes	Aphelenchoides sp.
Root-knot nematode	Meloidogyne javanica

== Viral and viroid diseases ==
Viral and viroid diseases
Impatiens necrotic spot	genus Tospovirus, Impatiens necrotic spot virus (INSV)
Tomato spotted wilt	genus Tospovirus, Tomato spotted wilt virus (TSWV)

== Bibliography ==
- Common Names of Diseases, The American Phytopathological Society
