= Heterodera hordecalis =

Scientific classification
- Kingdom: Animalia
- Phylum: Nematoda
- Class: Chromadorea
- Order: Rhabditida
- Family: Heteroderidae
- Genus: Heterodera
- Species: H. hordecalis

Binomial name
- Heterodera hordecalis Andersson, 1975

Species of roundworm

Heterodera hordecalis is a plant pathogenic nematode affecting barley.

== See also ==
- List of oat diseases
