= Fusarium affine =

Scientific classification
- Kingdom: Fungi
- Division: Ascomycota
- Class: Sordariomycetes
- Order: Hypocreales
- Family: Nectriaceae
- Genus: Fusarium
- Species: F. affine

Binomial name
- Fusarium affine Fautrey & Lambotte

Species of fungus

Fusarium affine is a fungal plant pathogen affecting tobacco.

== See also ==
- List of tobacco diseases
