= Verticillium albo-atrum =

Scientific classification
- Kingdom: Fungi
- Division: Ascomycota
- Class: Sordariomycetes
- Order: Glomerellales
- Family: Plectosphaerellaceae
- Genus: Verticillium
- Species: V. albo-atrum

Binomial name
- Verticillium albo-atrum Reinke & Berthold, (1879)

Synonyms
- Verticillium albo-atrum var. caespitosum Wollenw., (1929); Verticillium albo-atrum var. tuberosum Rudolphi

Species of fungus

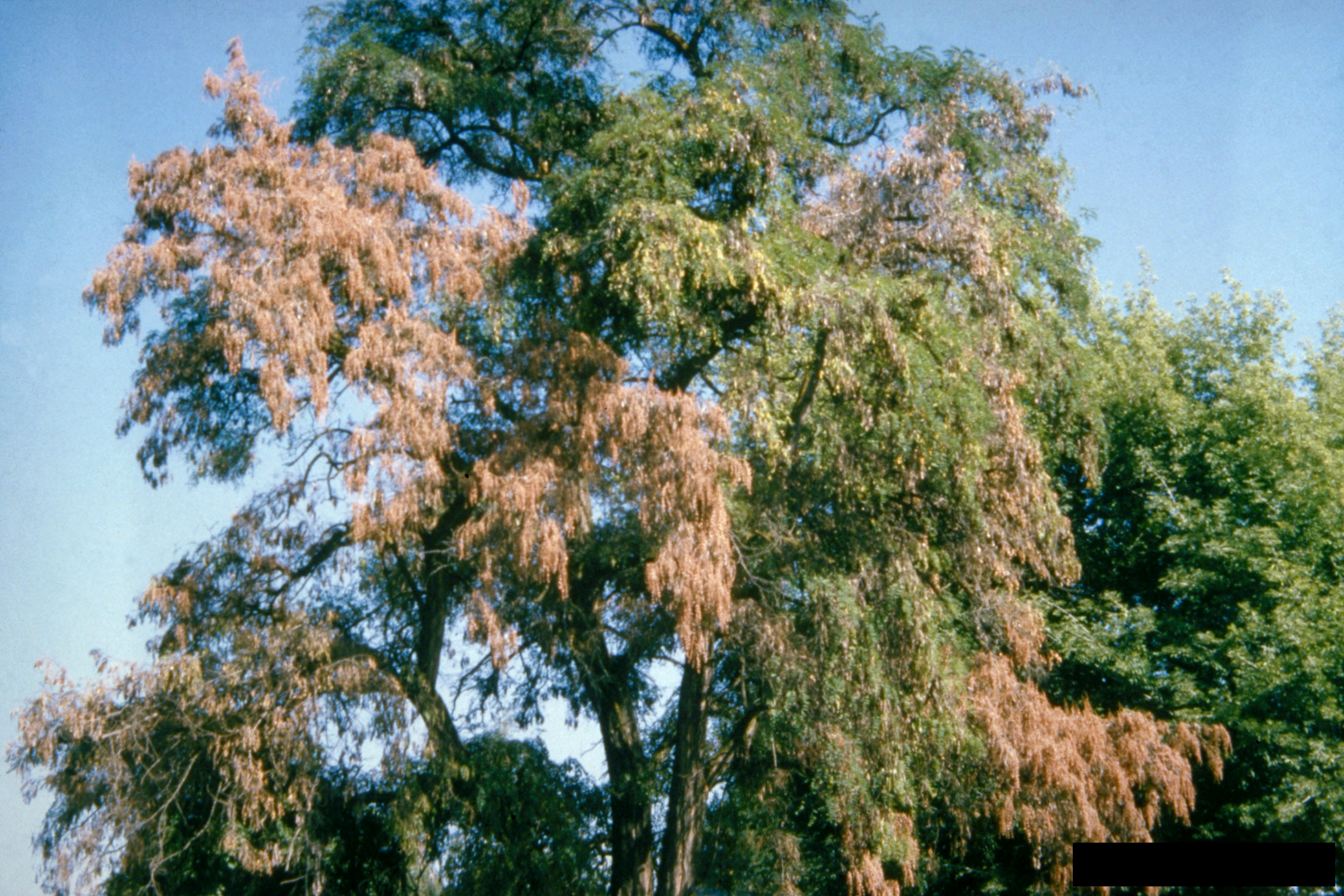
A tree infected with Verticillium Wilt

Verticillium albo-atrum is a plant pathogen with many hosts.

== Infected plants ==
See:

- List of potato diseases
- List of alfalfa diseases
- List of African daisy diseases
- List of beet diseases
- List of caneberries diseases
- List of tobacco diseases
- List of tomato diseases
- List of sunflower diseases
- List of strawberry diseases
- List of sapphire flower diseases
- List of rose diseases
- List of pocketbook plant diseases
- List of Capsicum diseases
- List of peanut diseases
- List of mint diseases
- List of mango diseases
- List of Jerusalem cherry diseases
- List of impatiens diseases
- List of hop diseases
- List of hemp diseases
- List of geranium diseases
- List of fuchsia diseases
- List of elm diseases
- List of dahlia diseases
- List of cucurbit diseases
- List of crucifer diseases
- List of cineraria diseases
- List of chickpea diseases
- List of Ficus diseases
