= List of pigeon pea diseases =

This article is a list of diseases of pigeon peas (Cajanus cajan).

== Bacterial diseases ==
Bacterial diseases
Bacterial leaf spot and stem canker	Xanthomonas campestris pv. cajani
Halo blight	Pseudomonas amygdali pv. phaseolicola

== Fungal diseases ==
Fungal diseases
Alternaria blight	Alternaria alternata Alternaria tenuissima
Anthracnose	Colletotrichum cajani Colletotrichum truncatum
Armillaria root rot	Armillaria mellea
Botryodiplodia blight	Lasiodiplodia theobromae = Botryodiplodia theobromae
Botryosphaeria stem canker	Botryosphaeria xanthocephala Fusicoccum cajani [anamorph]
Botrytis gray mold	Botrytis cinerea
Cercoseptoria leaf spot	Cercoseptoria cajanicola
Cercospora leaf spot	Mycovellosiella cajani = Cercospora cajani Cercospora indica Cercospora instabilis Cercospora thirumalacharii
Cladosporium leaf blight	Cladosporium oxysporum
Cladosporium leaf spot	Cladosporium cladosporioides
Collar rot	Sclerotium rolfsii Athelia rolfsii [teleomorph] = Corticium rolfsii
Colletotrichum stem canker	Colletotrichum crassipes
Damping-off	Pythium aphanidermatum Pythium splendens var. hawaiianum
Dieback and stem canker	Colletotrichum capsici
Diplodia stem canker	Diplodia cajani
Dry root rot	Macrophomina phaseolina = Rhizoctonia bataticola
Fusarium leaf blight	Fusarium pallidoroseum = Fusarium semitectum
Fusarium seedling rot	Fusarium avenaceum Fusarium equiseti
Fusarium wilt	Fusarium udum Gibberella indica [teleomorph]
Macrophomina stem canker	Macrophomina phaseolina =Rhizoctonia bataticola
Myrothecium leaf spot	Myrothecium gramineum Myrothecium roridum
Neocosmospora root rot	Neocosmospora vasinfecta
Periconia leaf spot	Periconia byssoides
Phaeoisariopsis leaf spot	Phaeoisariopsis griseola
Phoma stem canker	Phoma cajani
Phyllosticta leaf spot	Phyllosticta cajani
Phytophthora blight	Phytophthora drechsleri f.sp. cajani
Phytophthora root rot and stem blight	Phytophthora drechsleri
Phytophthora Stem Canker	Phytophthora nicotianae var. parasitica = Phytophthora parasitica
Powdery mildew	Leveillula taurica Oidiopsis taurica [anamorph] Ovulariopsis ellipsospora
Rust	Uredo cajani
Sclerotinia stem rot	Sclerotinia sclerotiorum
Seedling or seed rot	Aspergillus flavus Aspergillus niger
Synchytrium brown gall and wilt	Synchytrium phaseoli-radiati
Synchytrium orange gall	Synchytrium umbilicatum
Web blight	Thanatephorus cucumeris Rhizoctonia solani [anamorph]
Wet leaf rot	Choanephora cucurbitarum
Wet root rot	Rhizoctonia solani Thanatephorus cucumeris [teleomorph]

== Nematodes, parasitic ==
Nematodes, parasitic
Dirty root (reniform nematode)	Rotylenchulus reniformis
Lance nematode	Aphasmatylenchus; Hoplolaimus seinhorsti
Pearly root (cyst nematode)	Heterodera cajani
Root-knot (root-knot nematode)	Meloidogyne acronea Meloidogyne arenaria Meloidogyne incognita Meloidogyne javanica

== Viral diseases ==
Viral diseases
Arhar mosaic	Arhar mosaic virus
Foliar vein yellowing	Rhabdovirus
Mild mosaic	Tobacco mosaic virus
Mosaic	Alfalfa mosaic virus Cowpea mosaic virus
Phyllody	Mycoplasma-like organism
Rhynchosia little leaf	Mycoplasma-like organism
Rhynchosia Mosaic	Rosette Mycoplasma-like organism Virus (most likely)
Sterility mosaic	Pigeonpea Sterility Mosaic Virus
Witches' broom	Mycoplasma-like organism
Yellow mosaic	Mung bean yellow mosaic virus

== Miscellaneous diseases and disorders ==
Miscellaneous diseases and disorders
Marginal leaf burn	Salinity injury (most likely)
