= Rotylenchulidae =

Scientific classification
- Domain: Eukaryota
- Kingdom: Animalia
- Phylum: Nematoda
- Class: Chromadorea
- Order: Panagrolaimida
- Family: Rotylenchulidae

Family of roundworms

Rotylenchulidae is a family of nematodes belonging to the order Rhabditida.

Genera:

- Acontylus Meagher, 1968
- Bilobodera Sharma & Siddiqi, 1992
- Rotylenchulus Linford & Oliveira, 1940
- Senegalonema Germani, Luc & Baldwin, 1984
