= Bipolaris cactivora =

Scientific classification
- Kingdom: Fungi
- Division: Ascomycota
- Class: Dothideomycetes
- Order: Pleosporales
- Family: Pleosporaceae
- Genus: Bipolaris
- Species: B. cactivora

Binomial name
- Bipolaris cactivora (Petr.) Alcorn (1983)

Synonyms
- Drechslera cactivora (Petr.) M.B. Ellis (1971); Helminthosporium cactivorum Petr. (1931)

Species of fungus

Bipolaris cactivora is a plant pathogen causing cactus stem rot and pitaya fruit rot.

== Hosts and symptoms ==
Bipolaris cactivora is an ascomycete, causing cactus stem rot and pitahaya (dragon fruit) rot. Also known as Drechslera cactivora, this fungus has been reported causing fruit rot on Hylocereus undatus (white-fleshed pitahaya). This specific cactus is both used decoratively as well as commercially in production of pitahaya fruit. The initial symptoms of the disease, appearing two to three days after inoculation, are yellowish lesions that are water soaked, which progress to a brown color. Seven to ten days after initial appearance of lesions, the rot expands to form large areas of rot which grow dark colored spores. The rot then dries, and the plant dies.

== Disease cycle ==
Bipolaris cactivora will overwinter in the asexual state as conidia on grass, weeds, and debris, although sometimes the mycelia will also live on debris or weeds. The pathogen normally begins to infect a host in late spring and early summer when the hosts start to flower and the temperature raises above 25 °C. Once the conidia infect the petals they do not start to cause any visible symptoms until the fruit begins to grow and ripen within the flower. Once the fruit ripens, the fungal conidia germinate, producing mycelia. The mycelia will then produce hyphae that force their way into the openings of the plant tissue and take hold of the host. When the temperature rises to around 35º the mycelia will start to mature into fruiting bodies that release their ascospores. These are distributed by wind, rain, and irrigation. Some of these will make it to a viable host, grass, weeds, and debris, and will begin to form conidia on the surface. The conidia will infect additional hosts that are in close proximity where they will wait for the next flowering period. The conidia are primarily distributed by wind and rain.

== Disease management ==
There are currently no fungicides labeled for use to combat B. cactivora in the United States, though difenoconazole has been shown to be effective against the fungus. The recommended cultural practices to combat Bipolaris rot are to limit canopy wetness and to maintain a sanitized field. Irrigating in the morning to allow for the plants to dry throughout the day as well as proper spacing of the plants to allow airflow through the canopy will aid in drying and prevention of conditions suitable for the fungus. Similarly, field sanitation will interfere with the fungus' ability to overwinter as conidia in plant debris, limiting exposure to the fungus during the following season. Bacillus subtilis and Bacillus amyloliquefaciens have been shown to be effective biocontrol methods for fungus prevention.

== Importance ==
Cacti and plants like pitaya are becoming more popular as ornamental garden plants and produce, especially in places where they can grow naturally such as the southwest and Florida. It is also increasingly being grown on a commercial scale for food and medicinal purposes. Pitaya, specifically, is being grown in ten countries and without proper care B. cactivora can cause up to 44% economic loss of pitaya yields. Grafted cacti are also extremely susceptible to B. cactivora, which is a huge problem for countries like South Korea whose exports of grafted cacti represent 70% of the global market. Many of the countries that grow pitaya or cacti such as South Korea, Vietnam, and most of south east Asia, are in tropical regions with little wealth and farmers often do not have the resources to combat the disease.

== Environment ==
Bipolaris cactivora grows fastest in warm, damp, humid environments. It is most severe between 75 and 91 °F. This is reflected in the countries and regions where B. cactivora is reportedly found, namely Florida, Vietnam, Japan, Korea, Israel, and China. These tropical and subtropical areas are high in both humidity and temperature, making them very conducive to the growth of the pathogen. As cactus for pitahaya fruit is often grown in warm, humid greenhouses in Korea, the pathogen is often found in cactus farms. Spread of the fungus is mediated by wind, irrigation, and rain, so these conditions are helpful but not entirely necessary for fungal growth. Plants that are grown very closely together may similarly have issues with this fungus, as they will make a wet, humid microclimate that is conducive to the growth of B. cactivora.

== Pathogenesis ==
The pathogen grows best in a high humidity environment, above 65%, in temperatures between 25 and 35 °C. it was found to be able to infect both the wounded and unwounded fruits, and wounded plant stems. The wounded fruit were also found to be much more susceptible to the disease than the healthy fruit. The symptoms are dark green and black lesions and rot in the fruit and stems. On average inoculated plants took four to five days to start exhibiting symptoms regardless of if the fruit stem or seedling was infected. Seedlings and juvenile plants are the most susceptible to the pathogen and are much more likely to see the disease spread across the entire plant instead of being isolated near the point of infection.
