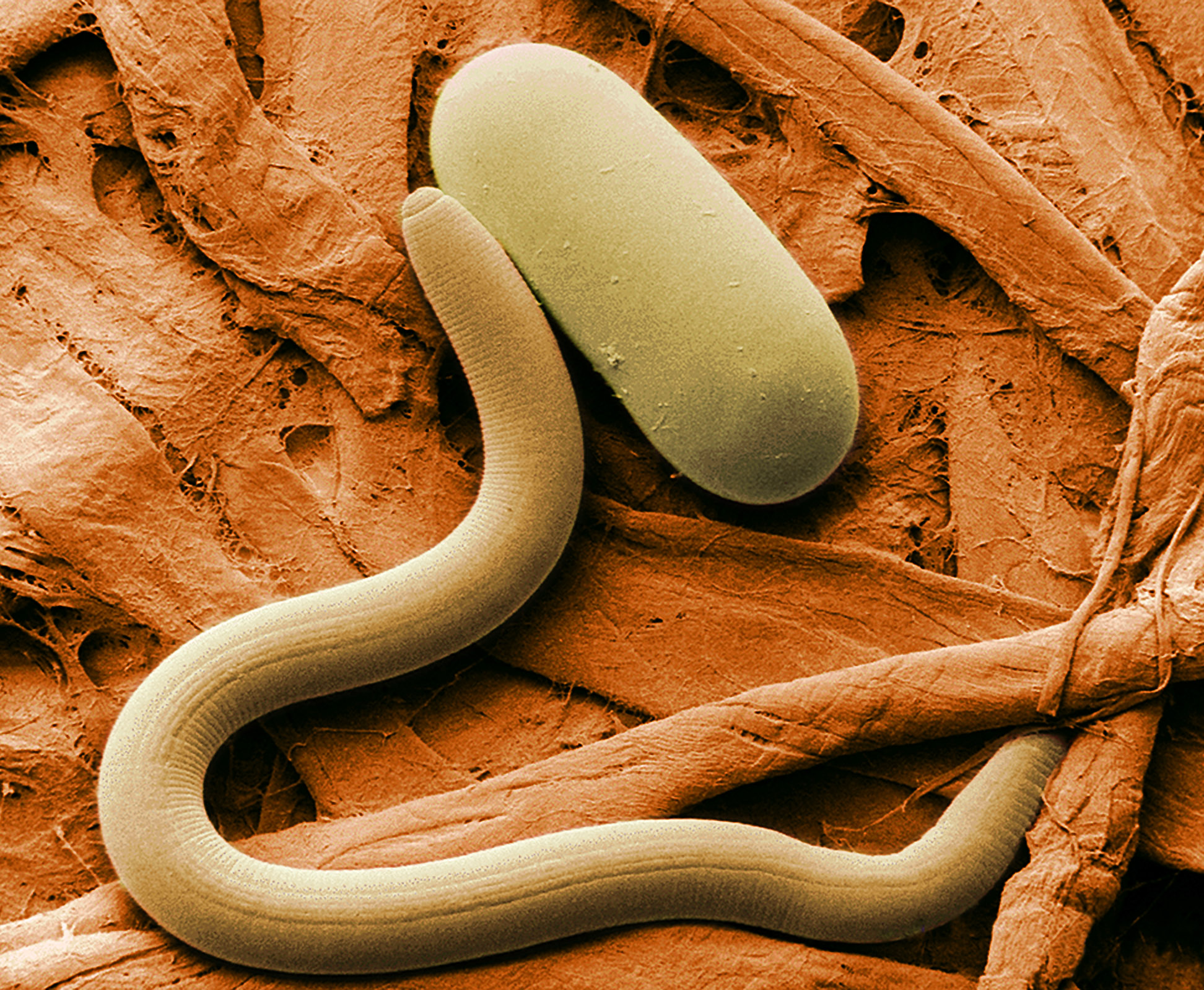
- Soybean cyst nematode and egg

Scientific classification
- Kingdom: Animalia
- Phylum: Nematoda
- Class: Secernentea
- Order: Tylenchida
- Family: Heteroderidae
- Genus: Heterodera
- Species: H. glycines

Binomial name
- Heterodera glycines Ichinohe, 1952

= Soybean cyst nematode =

Species of roundworm

The soybean cyst nematode (SCN), Heterodera glycines, is a species of nematode and agricultural pest notable for being the most damaging to soybean crop yields in the U.S., targeting the roots of soybean and other legume plants. When infection is severe SCNs cause stunting, yellowing, impaired canopy development, and yield loss. The symptoms caused by SCNs can go easily unrecognized by farmers—in some cases there are no warning symptoms before a loss of 40% of the yield. (Note: "You can literally have 40% yield loss with no symptoms," says Greg Tylka, Iowa State University (ISU) Extension nematologist.) Due to the slight stunting and yellowing, many farmers may mistake these symptoms as environmental problems when in fact they are SCNs. Another symptom of SCNs that may affect farmers' yields is stunted roots with fewer nitrogen-fixing nodules. Due to the fact that soybean cyst nematodes can only move a few centimeters in the soil by themselves, they mostly are spread via tillage or plant transplants. This area of infection will look patchy and nonuniform making diagnosis more difficult for farmers. They can be seen in the roots of summer soybean plants if the roots are taken out very carefully and gently washed with water. (Note: A root dig can indicate the telltale SCN sign of little white SCN females on roots.) The egg masses should be seen as bright white or yellow "pearls" on the roots. The later the roots are pulled the harder it will be to diagnose due to the SCNs female dying and turning a much darker color, forming a "cyst".

== Biology ==
As the nematode feeds, it swells. The female swells so much that her posterior end bursts out of the root and she becomes visible to the naked eye. In contrast, the adult male regains a wormlike shape, and he leaves the root in order to find and fertilize the large females. The female continues to feed as she lays 200 to 400 eggs in a yellow gelatinous matrix, forming an egg sac which remains inside her. She then dies and her cuticle hardens forming a cyst. The eggs may hatch when conditions in the soil are favorable, the larvae developing inside the cyst and the biological cycle repeating itself. There are usually three generations in the year. In the autumn or in unfavorable conditions, the cysts containing dormant larvae may remain intact in the soil for several years. Although soybean is the primary host of SCN, other legumes can also serve as hosts.

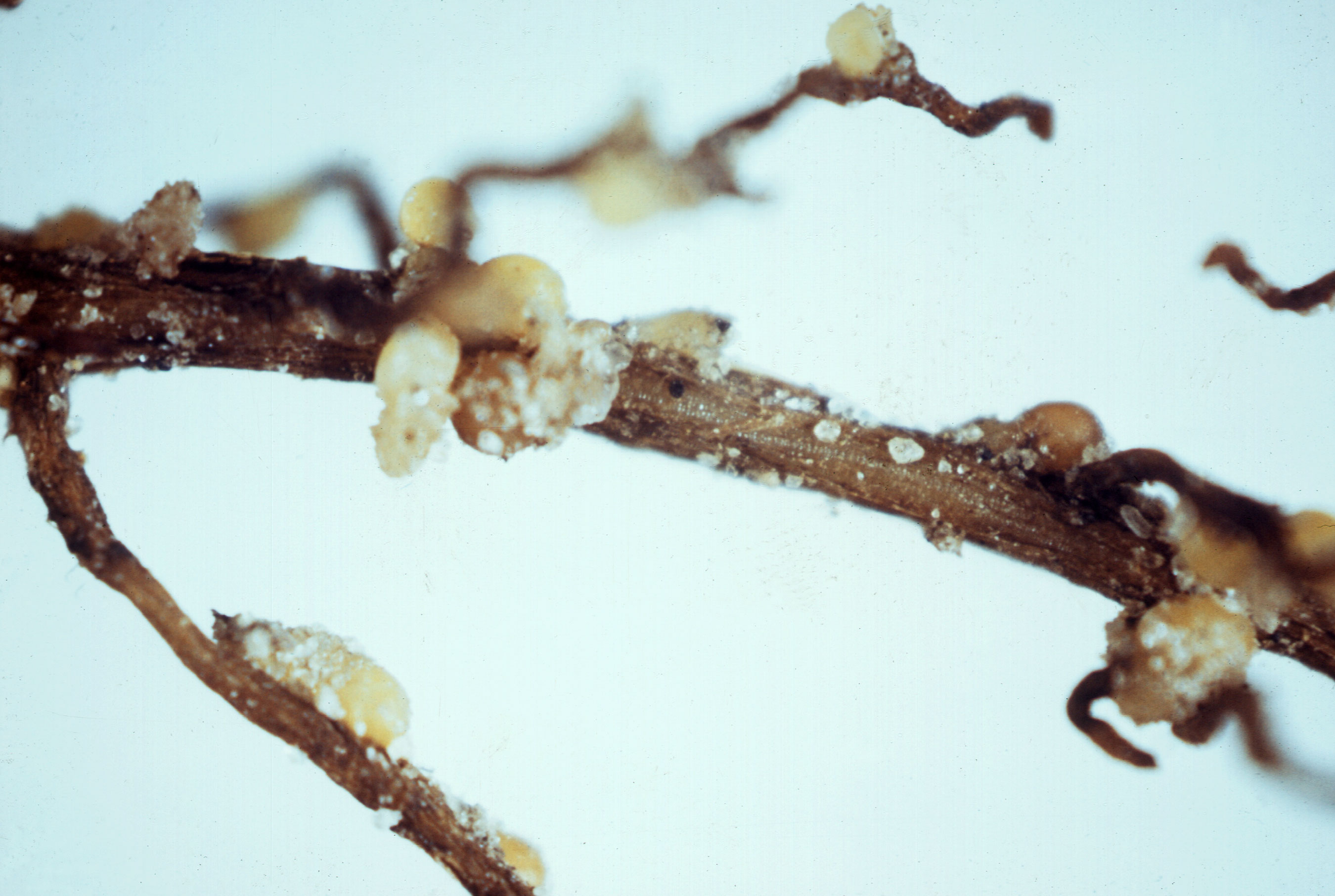
Segment of infected soybean root. Signs of infection are white to brown cysts filled with eggs that are attached to root surfaces.

== Disease cycle ==
Soybean cyst nematodes are so devastating because of their life cycle being so efficient for multiplication. They have six life stages, which is the norm for all nematodes. These stages are egg, juvenile (J1-J4), and adult, and they can complete multiple cycles within a single growing season. The SCNs makes its first molt while still inside the egg going from a juvenile 1 (J1) to a juvenile 2 (J2). When the soybean cyst nematode is a J2 it may then enter the root of the plant, usually just behind the root tip. Once the SCNs have gained entry into the root, they can create specialized feeding cells called syncytia by penetrating the pericycle, endodermis, or cortex cell with their stylet in order to take in nutrients from the plant. These are cell masses with multiple nuclei that are formed due to cell wall dissolution and fusion. The J2 will then continue on in its development only when a syncytium cell is created. Female SCNs will remain there for the rest of their life, while males will leave the root after reaching adulthood. The males are attracted to a pheromone that is released by the female when her egg mass is ready for fertilization. When the eggs from the egg mass are fertilized, some of them will hatch within that same growing year to continue on with infection. Eggs will still remain inside the female, and when she dies and hardens into a "cyst", they will go into dormancy until the following growing season or until conditions are favorable. This cyst is very resilient against environmental conditions and can hold as many as 250 eggs.

== Locations ==
- Africa: Egypt
- Asia: Iran (Golestan Province and Mazandaran Province), China (Hebei, Hubei, Heilongjiang, Henan, Jiangsu, Liaoning), Indonesia (Java), Korean peninsula, Japan, Taiwan (unconfirmed), Russia (Amur District in the Far East).
- North America: Canada (Ontario), USA (Alabama, Arkansas, Delaware, Florida, Georgia, Illinois, Indiana, Iowa, Kansas, Kentucky, Louisiana, Maryland, Minnesota, Michigan, Mississippi, Missouri, Nebraska, New Jersey, North Carolina, North Dakota, Ohio, Oklahoma, Pennsylvania, South Carolina, South Dakota, Tennessee, Texas, Virginia and Wisconsin).
- South America: Argentina, Brazil, Chile, Colombia, Ecuador.

== Management ==
Management of soybean cyst nematodes can be very difficult. Due to symptoms being hard to spot early on, they can infect a field rather quickly and persist indefinitely. SCNs can survive in the soil for long periods of time under adverse conditions, can work up on infecting previously resistant varieties of plants, (Note: There have been cases where SCN has clipped yields of SCN-resistant varieties. Reliance on the main genetic source of SCN resistance (PI 88788) may be helping SCN to overcome SCN-resistant varieties.) and can never be completely eliminated (only suppressed). For these reasons SCNs is a very economically devastating pest. SCNs cause up to $1.3 billion in annual losses due to their resilience and persistence in the soil. In addition, SCNs can cause yield losses that exceed 30%. Soybean cyst nematodes can easily be prevented by thoroughly cleaning farm equipment to prevent introduction to the field. If a field is already infected on the other hand, that will not do much except help contain the infection from spreading to other fields. Right now, the most effective way of management is reducing tillage, planting resistant varieties, (Note: Genetics, ... play a part, too. "With higher land costs, you have to have higher management," he says. ... Select ... varieties coupled with appropriate defensive characteristics ... says Naeve. "You have to figure out how to get the right variety in the right field," he adds. ... Picking defensive characteristics is key. Moore picks varieties resistant to soybean cyst nematode (SCN) ... Planting SCN-resistant varieties can help you minimize yield losses on SCN-infested soils. ... For now, Tylka advises farmers to continue planting SCN-resistant varieties on infested soils. In most cases, they still work. "Cyst-resistant varieties pay dividends twice – with decreases in egg population and yield increases," he says.) and crop rotation. Crop rotation is a very effective measure of control in heavily infested fields. Growing nonhost plants for two consecutive years is generally appropriate to allow for the growth of susceptible soybean cultivars. The more consecutive years of crop rotation used, the more effective this method will be in fields with high infestations. One full year may be sufficient in fields in which the nematode population is low or is heavily parasitized by fungi. Reducing tillage will help isolate the SCNs into just the infected area because they are small and do not travel very far. SCNs in the cyst form will have about 50% of their eggs hatch each year so numbers can be greatly reduced if they do not have a host to infect for several years. Planting resistant cultivars, rotating crops from soybean to corn, and planting cover crops are very effective management strategies to reduce the SCN population in a field. Studies have been done on using fungal root endophytes, such as Fusarium, in deterring against nematodes which could be the next step in SCN prevention.

=== Resistant soybean varieties ===
Resistant varieties are available.

==== PI 88788 ====
The vast majority, however, rely on one breeding line (PI 88788) as their only source of resistance. (Note: Reliance on the main genetic source of SCN resistance (PI 88788)may be helping SCN to overcome SCN-resistant varieties. Out of 807 resistant varieties listed by ISU this year, just 18 had a genetic background outside of PI 88788. "We have lots of varieties to pick from, but the genetic background is not as diverse as we would like it to be," says Tylka.) (The resistance genes provided by PI 88788, Peking, and PI 90763 were characterized in 1997.) As a result, for example, in 2012 only 18 cultivars out of 807 recommended by the Iowa State University Extension had any ancestry outside of PI 88788. By 2020 the situation was still about the same: Of 849 there were 810 with some ancestry from PI 88788, 35 from Peking, and only 2 from PI 89772. (On the question of exclusively PI 88788 ancestry, that number was not available for 2020.) That was speculated to be in 2012—and was clearly by 2020—producing SCN populations that are virulent on PI 88788.
