= Hymenula affinis =

Scientific classification
- Kingdom: Fungi
- Division: Ascomycota
- Genus: Hymenula
- Species: H. affinis

Binomial name
- Hymenula affinis (Fautrey & Lambotte) Wollenw., (1916)

Species of fungus

Hymenula affinis is an ascomycete fungus that is a plant pathogen.
