= Setty =

Setty is a surname. Notable people with the surname include:

- Challa Sreenivasulu Setty (born 1965), Indian banker
- Doddanna Setty (1840–1921), Indian merchant and philanthropist
- Suman Setty (fl. 2002), Indian actor
- S.V. Setty (1879–1918), Indian aviator
