= Cercospora nicotianae =

Scientific classification
- Kingdom: Fungi
- Division: Ascomycota
- Class: Dothideomycetes
- Order: Mycosphaerellales
- Family: Mycosphaerellaceae
- Genus: Cercospora
- Species: C. nicotianae

Binomial name
- Cercospora nicotianae Ellis & Everh. (1893)

Species of fungus that infects plants

Cercospora nicotianae is a cosmopolitan fungal plant pathogen and the causal agent of frog-eye leaf spot (FLS) on tobacco (Nicotiana tabacum). The disease is a significant factor in tobacco production worldwide, causing lesions on leaves that reduce crop yield and the quality of cured leaf tobacco.

== Taxonomy ==
The species Cercospora nicotianae was formally described by American botanists J. B. Ellis and B. M. Everhart in 1893. The fungus is classified under the phylum Ascomycota. It is known primarily by its asexual stage, or anamorph, which is a common characteristic among Cercospora species. The conceptual framework for the genus was defined by C. Chupp in his 1954 monograph. C. nicotianae reflects historical classification debates and has known synonyms, such as C. raciborskii.

== Description ==
=== Symptoms ===
Infection by C. nicotianae on tobacco leaves initially appears as small, water-soaked flecks. These rapidly expand to form the characteristic "frog-eye" lesions*, which are typically 2–15 mm in diameter. These lesions are circular, featuring a distinct reddish-brown or dark margin surrounding a pale tan, gray, or parchment-like center.

=== Microscopic Features ===
Under conditions of high humidity, the centers of the lesions develop minute black dots known as pseudostromata, from which hyaline (translucent), slender conidiophores emerge. These structures produce needle-shaped asexual spores (conidia) that facilitate the spread of the pathogen.

== Ecology and Life Cycle ==
C. nicotianae is primarily a pathogen of tobacco, but it also infects a wide range of alternate hosts within the Solanaceae family, including tomato, eggplant, and various Physalis weeds. The fungus survives between growing seasons in infected crop debris on the soil surface and can persist on perennial host plants. Spread and new infections occur when **conidia** (asexual spores) are disseminated by wind or rain-splash to nearby host leaves.

A unique feature contributing to the pathogen's virulence is the production of the photo-activated phytotoxin, Cercosporin. This toxin generates highly reactive species, primarily singlet oxygen, which causes lipid peroxidation and damage to host cell membranes, leading to cell death and disease development.

== Distribution ==
Cercospora nicotianae is cosmopolitan, found across all major tobacco-producing regions globally. It is particularly severe in tropical and subtropical regions characterized by high temperatures and high humidity, including Central America, South Asia, and Africa. Its geographical range is generally noted between 35° North and 35° South latitudes worldwide.

== Management ==
The primary economic impact of the disease is a reduction in leaf yield and the development of "barn spot" on the cured leaves, which significantly lowers the value of the tobacco crop. Control strategies integrate cultural practices (crop rotation, sanitation) and chemical control (fungicides).

A notable challenge in management is the widespread issue of quinone outside inhibitor (QoI) fungicide resistance, particularly to active ingredients like azoxystrobin. This resistance is conferred by point mutations in the fungal cytochrome b gene (cytb), specifically the G143A and F129L mutations. Isolates carrying the G143A mutation exhibit a high level of resistance.
