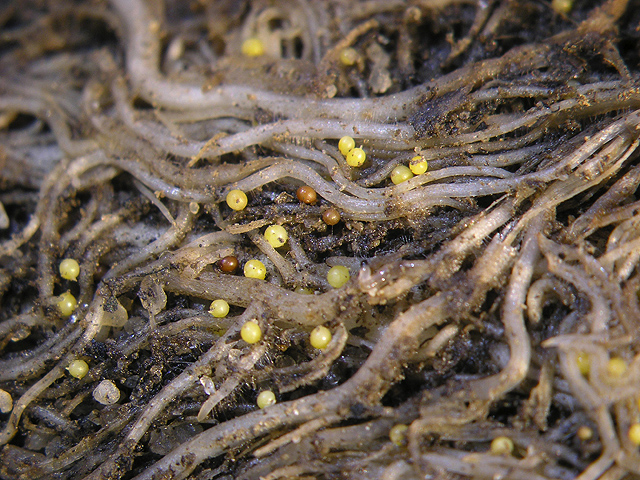
- Nematode cysts on potato roots

Scientific classification
- Kingdom: Animalia
- Phylum: Nematoda
- Class: Chromadorea
- Order: Rhabditida
- Family: Heteroderidae
- Subfamily: Heteroderinae
- Genus: Globodera; Skarbilovich, 1959

Species
- Globodera achilleae; Globodera artemisiae; Globodera chaubattia; Globodera ellingtonae; Globodera hypolysi; Globodera leptonepia; Globodera millefolii; Globodera mirabilis; Globodera pallida; Globodera pseudorostochiensis; Globodera rostochiensis; Globodera tabacum; Globodera zelandica

= Potato cyst nematode =

Potato cyst nematode (Eel worms)

Genus of roundworms that live on potato roots

Potato root nematodes or potato cyst nematodes (PCN) are 1-mm long roundworms belonging to the genus Globodera, which comprises around 12 species. They live on the roots of plants of the family Solanaceae, such as potatoes and tomatoes. PCN cause growth retardation and, at very high population densities, damage to the roots and early senescence of plants. The nematode is not indigenous to Europe but originates from the Andes. Fields are free from PCN until an introduction occurs, after which the typical patches, or hotspots, occur on the farmland. These patches can become full field infestations when unchecked. Yield reductions can average up to 60% at high population densities.

Medium scale distribution of the potato cyst nematode: "hotspot" or "infestation focus". Primary hotspot (introduction into the field) and two secondary hotspots (caused by cultivation). Each square = 1m^{2}.

== Biology and life cycle ==
The eggs hatch in the presence of Solanoeclepine A, a substance secreted by the roots of host plants otherwise known as root exudates. The nematodes hatch when they grow into a second-stage juvenile (J2). At this stage, the J2 nematodes find host cells on which to feed. The potato cyst nematodes are endoparasites meaning they go completely into the root to feed. Access to the root cells is gained through piercing through the cell wall using the nematode’s stylet. After a feeding tube has been established, a syncytium begins to form through the breakdown of multiple cell walls adjacent to each other. J2 nematodes continue to feed until they grow into third-stage juveniles (J3), then fourth-stage juveniles (J4), and finally reach the adult stage. The shape of the J3 females begins to appear more like a sac as the female grows into a J4 nematode. At the J4 stage, the body of the female nematode lies outside of the root while the head remains inside the cell. During this stage, the male nematodes become motile again and are then able to fertilize the female nematodes leading to embryos developing inside the female body. Once the female is fertilized, the female dies and leaves a protective cyst containing 200-500 eggs. Once the cysts detach from the original hosts, they remain in the soil until they find another suitable host beginning the cycle again. Cyst nematodes are monocyclic because they have one life cycle per season. Potato cyst nematodes can be detected by their patchy distribution in the field. The specific distribution is caused by the limited spread of these nematodes. Most potato cyst nematodes don’t migrate very far across a field because of their feeding patterns. Both susceptible and resistant potato varieties will suffer from growth retardation at low and medium populations densities. At very high population densities mechanical damage of the root system will occur. The female individuals swell up and appear as cysts on the surface of the roots, each containing up to 400 eggs. In temperate zones only one generation per year will occur. In the Mediterranean countries sometimes a second generation is reported. Cysts can then also be found on the skin of the tubers. Each year without host a certain fraction of the eggs will hatch (spontaneous hatch). The eggs can survive for up to 20 years inside these cysts.

== Pest control ==
The speed of spread of the nematodes from field to field can be reduced by cleaning equipment of possibly infested soil before changing location and by using only certified PCN-free seed tubers. If possible, ask for seed potatoes grown on fields which were declared free of the potato cyst nematode. Pesticides can be used, but they will not get a field free of nematodes. They will increase yields and are only profitable at high population densities, when the financial profit of the extra yield will surpass the cost of the pesticide application. Crop rotation with at least 6 years between planting of a susceptible crop is an effective means to reduce nematode population densities to below damage threshold. However, the best way to manage potato cyst nematodes is the use of (partial) resistant potato varieties. During the last 10 years a number of varieties have been developed which can keep both potato cyst nematode species below damage and detection threshold, without the use of pesticides.

Other methods of pest control include nematicides such as fosthiazate (Nemathorin), aldicarb (Temik), oxamyl (Vydate) and fluopyram which are applied to the soil. The level of toxicity is important to consider when applying and depends on the manufacturer and the specific instructions of application. The use of certified disease free seed will also assure that potato cyst nematodes are not present due to planting infected tubers. Soil testing for potato cyst nematodes is also crucial in keeping track of the prevalence of the nematodes. Controlling the quantity of the nematodes allows the prevention of an epidemic. Lastly, resistance to potato cyst nematode has been found in Solanum acaule. The downside is that Solanum acaule is a wild potato species containing high glycoalkaloid content making it toxic for consumers. The use of trap crops such as Solanum sisymbriifolium has been shown to reduce the density of PCN in soil by up to 80%, reducing the need for pesticide application

== Importance ==
Potato cyst nematodes have the ability to cause a large scale devastation in crops due to the massive amounts of nematode embryos in each cyst. Many continents across the world such as Australia, North America, Asia, Europe, and Africa have had many epidemics of potato cyst nematodes that continue to persist year after year. Potato cyst nematodes are important economically due to the fact that they can substantially reduce crop yields. Globodera pallida are able to cause 80% yield loss in a potato field if left untreated. On a more global scale, the Australian potato industry is worth about AUD$500 million yearly which equates to $340 million U.S. dollars.
