= Bilobodera =

Scientific classification
- Domain: Eukaryota
- Kingdom: Animalia
- Phylum: Nematoda
- Class: Chromadorea
- Order: Panagrolaimida
- Family: Rotylenchulidae
- Genus: Bilobodera; Sharma & Siddiqi, 1992

Genus of roundworms

Bilobodera is a genus of nematodes belonging to the family Rotylenchulidae.

Species:

- Bilobodera flexa Sharma & Siddiqi, 1992
- Bilobodera mesoangustus (Minagawa, 1986)
