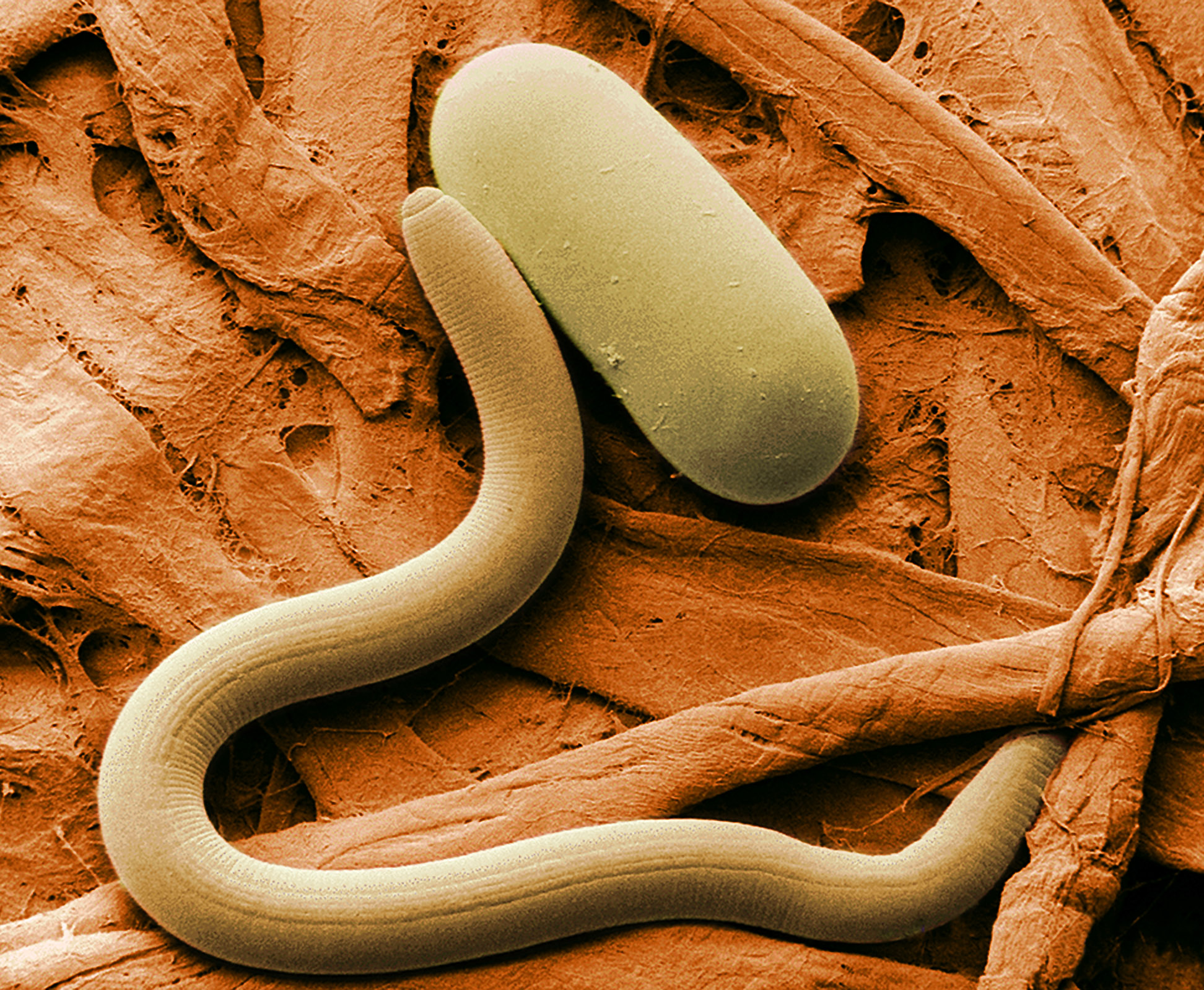
- Heterodera glycines, worm and egg

Scientific classification
- Domain: Eukaryota
- Kingdom: Animalia
- Phylum: Nematoda
- Class: Secernentea
- Subclass: Tylenchia
- Order: Tylenchida

Families
- See text

= Tylenchida =

Order of roundworms

Tylenchida is an order of nematodes.

== List of families ==
- Superfamily Criconematoidea
  - Family Criconematidae
  - Family Tylenchulidae
- Superfamily Tylenchoidea
  - Family Anguinidae
  - Family Belonolaimidae
  - Family Dolichodoridae
  - Family Ecphyadophoridae
  - Family Hoplolaimidae
  - Family Heteroderidae
  - Family Pratylenchidae
  - Family Tylenchidae
- Superfamily Sphaerularina
  - Family Allantonematidae
  - Family Fergusobiidae
  - Family Iotonchiidae
  - Family Parasitylenchidae
  - Family Sphaerulariidae
