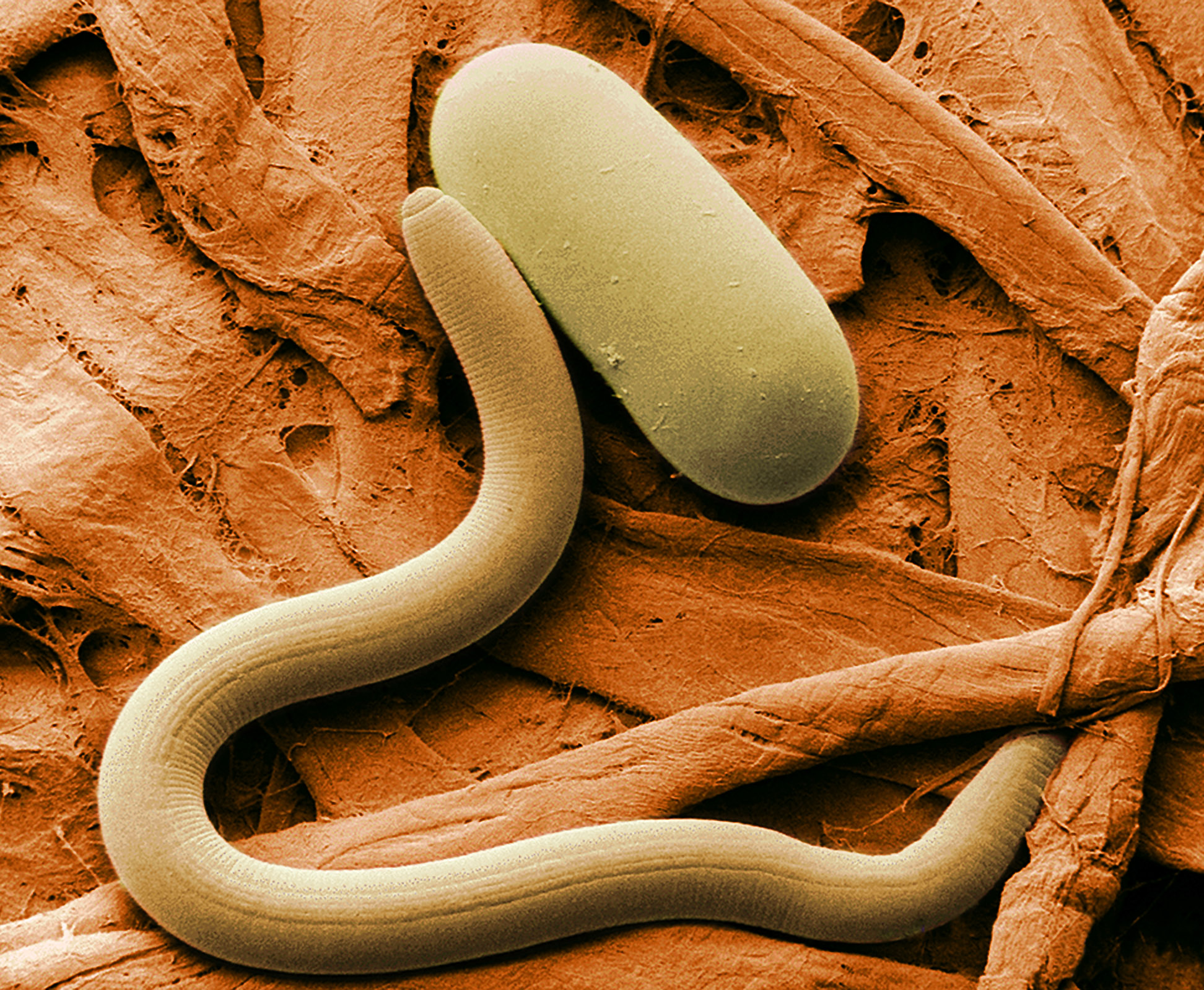
- Heterodera glycines

Scientific classification
- Domain: Eukaryota
- Kingdom: Animalia
- Phylum: Nematoda
- Class: Secernentea
- Order: Tylenchida
- Superfamily: Tylenchoidea
- Family: Heteroderidae

Genera
- Afenestrata; Bilobodera; Dolichodorus; Ekphymatodera; Globodera; Heterodera; Hylonema; Meloidodera; Meloidogyne

= Heteroderidae =

Family of roundworms

Heteroderidae is a family of nematodes. The name comes from the Greek heteros = other and deras = skin (derm). This "refers to the different 'skins' of female and cyst."

== Genetics ==
GenBank has unusually extensive coverage of Heteroderidae internal transcribed spacers, most of which has been generated by Sergei Subbotin and collaborators (Subbotin et al. 1999, Clapp et al. 2000, Subbotin et al. 2000, Zeng et al. 2000, Subbotin et al. 2001, Amiri & Subbotin 2002, Subbotin et al. 2003). In total over 1/3 of described Heteroderidae have some ITS data in GenBank. Overall Subbotin et al. find the preexisting taxonomy to fit very well with these sequences, with some room for further diversification of recognized species to fit this new molecular evidence.
