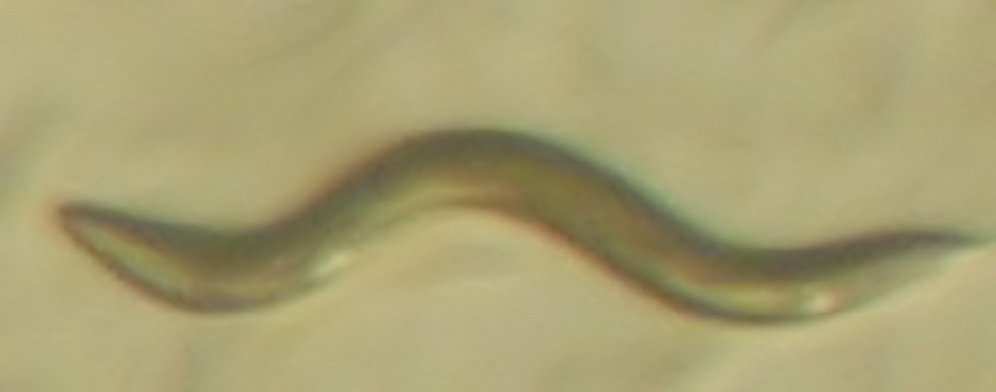

Scientific classification
- Kingdom: Animalia
- Phylum: Nematoda
- Class: Secernentea

Subclasses
- Diplogasteria (disputed); Rhabditia (paraphyletic?); Spiruria; Tylenchia (disputed) and see text

= Secernentea =

Class of roundworms

Secernentea was a class of nematodes in the Classical Phylogeny System (Chitwood, 1958) and is no longer in use. This morphological-based classification system has been replaced by the Modern Phylogeny system, where taxonomy assignment is based on small subunit ribosomal DNA (SSU rDNA).

== Description ==
Amphid apertures of Secernenteas are pore or slit-like.

Some Secernenteas have deirids which are located near nerve ring.

Secernenteas have posterior phasmids.

The excretory system of a Secernentea is tubular.

Cuticles of Secernenteas are striated in two to four layers. Lateral field is present.

Secernenteas have three esophageal glands. Their esophageal structure varies.

Male Secernenteas generally have one testis.

Caudal alae are common in Secernenteas.

Sensory papillae of Secernenteas are cephalic only. It might be caudal papillae in male Secernenteas.

Secernenteas are mostly found in land but they are rarely found in marine water or freshwater.

== Taxonomy ==
Subclasses and orders of Secernentea are:

- Subclass Rhabditia (paraphyletic?)
  - Rhabditida
  - Strongylida
- Subclass Spiruria
  - Ascaridida
  - Camallanida (sometimes included in Spirurida)
  - Drilonematida (sometimes included in Spirurida)
  - Oxyurida (= Rhabdiasida)
  - Rhigonematida (formerly in Tylenchia)
  - Spirurida
- Subclass Diplogasteria (may belong in Rhabditia)
  - Diplogasterida
- Subclass Tylenchia (may belong in Rhabditia)
  - Aphelenchida
  - Tylenchida

Some families traditionally considered to be Rhabditida seem to be closer to the Tylenchida. If the Tylenchia are to be maintained as separate, they probably will be included therein.

== See also ==
- Adenophorea
