= List of banana and plantain diseases =

This article is a list of diseases of bananas and plantains (Musa spp.).

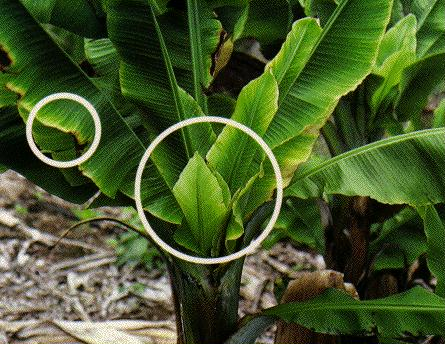
Photo showing symptoms of the Banana Bunchy Top Virus (BBTV)

== Bacterial diseases ==
Bacterial diseases
Bacterial wilt	Pseudomonas solanacearum (race 1)
Blood disease	Ralstonia syzigii subsp. celebensis
Bugtok	Ralstonia solanacearum (race 2)
Finger tip rot (gumming)	Burkholderia cenocepacia (syn. Pseudomonas cenocepacia) Pseudomonas spp.
Moko	Ralstonia solanacearum (race 2)
Rhizome rot	Erwinia carotovora (syn. Pectobacterium carotovorum) Erwinia chrysanthemi (syn. Dickeya dadantii)
Javanese vascular wilt	Pseudomonas spp.
Xanthomonas wilt (BXW), Banana bacterial wilt, enset wilt	Xanthomonas campestris pv. musacearum

== Fungal diseases ==
Fungal diseases
Anthracnose	Colletotrichum musae
Armillaria corn rot	Armillaria mellea Armillaria tabescens
Black cross	Phyllachora musicola
Black leaf streak (BLS) or Black Sigatoka	Mycosphaerella fijiensis Paracercospora fijiensis syn. Pseudocercospora fijiensis [anamorph]
Black root rot	Rosellinia bunodes
Brown blotch	Pestalotiopsis leprogena
Brown spot	Cercospora hayi
Ceratocystis fruit rot	Ceratocystis paradoxa Chalara paradoxa [anamorph]
Cigar-end	Verticillium theobromae Trachysphaera fructigena
Cladosporium speckle	Cladosporium musae
Corm dry rot	Junghuhnia vincta
Cordana leaf spot	Cordana johnstonii Cordana musae
Crown rot	Fusarium pallidoroseum Colletotrichum musae Verticillium theobromae Fusarium spp. Acremonium spp.
Cylindrocladium root rot	Cylindrocladium spp.
Damping-off	Deightoniella torulosa
Deightoniella fruit speckle, leaf spot and tip rot	Deightoniella torulosa
Diamond spot	Cercospora hayi Fusarium spp.
Dwarf Cavendish tip rot	Nattrassia mangiferae = Hendersonula toruloidea
Eyespot	Drechslera gigantea
Fruit freckle (freckle)	Guignardia musae Phyllosticta musarum [anamorph]
Fruit rot	Botryosphaeria ribis
Fungal root-rot	Fusarium solani Nectria haematococca [teleomorph] Fusarium oxysporum Rhizoctonia spp.
Fungal scald	Colletotrichum musae
Leaf rust	Uredo musae Uromyces musae
Leaf speckle	Acrodontium simplex
Leaf spot	Curvularia eragrostidis
Leaf spot	Drechslera musae-sapientum
Leaf spot	Leptosphaeria musarum
Leaf spot	Pestalotiopsis disseminata
Main stalk rot	Ceratocystis paradoxa
Malayan leaf spot	Haplobasidion musae
Marasmiellus rot	Marasmiellus inoderma Marasmius semiustus
Panama disease (Fusarium wilt)	Fusarium oxysporum f.sp. cubense Races 1, 2 and 4 - inc.Tropical Race 4 (TR4) and Subtropical Race 4
Peduncle rot	Lasiodiplodia theobromae Fusarium pallidoroseum Fusarium oxysporum Verticillium theobromae
Pestalotiopsis leaf spot	Pestalotiopsis palmarum
Phaeoseptoria leaf spot	Phaeoseptoria musae
Pitting	Pyricularia grisea
Pseudostem heart rot	Fusarium moniliforme Gibberella fujikuroi [teleomorph]
Root & rhizome rot	Cylindrocarpon musae
Sclerotinia fruit rot	Sclerotinia sclerotiorum
Septoria leaf spot	Mycosphaerella eumusae [sexual stage] Septoria eumusae [anamorph] A new species even more aggressive than Black Sigatoka and spreading in Asia and the Indian Ocean.
Sheath rot	Nectria foliicola Mycosphaerella musicola Pseudocercospora musae [anamorph]
Sooty mold	Limacinula tenuis
Speckle	Mycosphaerella musae
Squirter (black end disease)	Nigrospora sphaerica
Stem-end rot	Colletotrichum musae
Trachysphaera finger rot	Trachysphaera fructigena
Tropical speckle	Ramichloridium musae = Veronaea musae = Periconiella musae
Verticillium tip rot	Verticillium theobromae
Yellow Sigatoka	Mycosphaerella musicola

== Viral diseases ==
Viral diseases
Disease	Viruses
Bract mosaic	Banana bract mosaic virus Abaca bract mosaic virus
Bunchy top	Banana bunchy top virus Abaca bunchy top virus
Mosaic	Cucumber mosaic virus Abaca mosaic virus
Streak	Banana streak virus
Banana mild mosaic	Banana mild mosaic virus
Banana virus X	Banana virus X

== Nematodes, parasitic ==
Nematodes, parasitic
Nematode root rot (burrowing nematode)	Radopholus similis
Root-knot	Meloidogyne arenaria Meloidogyne incognita Meloidogyne javanica
Root-lesion	Pratylenchus coffeae Pratylenchus goodeyi Pratylenchus brachyurus Pratylenchus reniformia
Spiral nematode root damage	Helicotylenchus multicinctus Helicotylenchus dihystera

== Miscellaneous diseases and disorders ==
Miscellaneous diseases and disorders
Alligator skin	Light abrasions on fruit peel caused by leaves or bracts
Blue disease	Magnesium deficiency
Choke	Low winter temperatures
Dwarfism	Genetic mutation
Elephantiasis	Unknown cause
Fruit chimera	Genetic mutation
Fused fingers	Genetic defect
Giantism	Genetic mutation
Heart leaf unfurling disorder	Unknown cause
High mat	Unknown cause
Leaf edge chlorosis	Unknown cause
Maturity bronzing	Unknown cause
Rayadilla	Zinc deficiency
Rosetting	Nitrogen deficiency
Roxana	Unknown cause
Spike leaf	Low winter temperatures
Split peel	Rapid filling of pulp of fruit
Taiwan marginal scorch	Unknown cause
"Segmented Banana"	Chilling injury to fruit One of the less common plantain diseases is exostentialis clittellus referred to by most plantain and banana farmers as "segmented banana". This is a result of the peel forming tiny inter-fruit membranes which cause the banana to appear as though it has been sliced before it is peeled. This is generally a result of freezing the fruit, and occurs most commonly in fruit that is sold in large stores or supermarkets.
Yellow mat	Unknown cause
Yellow pulp	Delay in fruit filling, drought, excessive shading, magnesium deficiency, poor nutrition
Yellows	Lack of water
Neer Vazhai	Unknown etiology
Kottai Vazhai or seediness in Parthenocarpic Poovan banana	Unknown etiology, probably due to BSV infection
