= R. H. Stover =

Canadian-Honduran phytopathologist (1926–2003)

- Born: December 2, 1926; Chatham, Ontario, Canada
- Died: February 25, 2003 (aged 76); La Lima, Honduras
- Known for: Musa, Foc/Panama disease, Fusarium in general, M. fijiensis, M. musicola
- Awards: Award for Contributions to Banana Research, ACORBAT; Gold Medal, Coll. Ag. Sci. Prof. Hond.; Medal of Honor for Merit, U. San Pedro Sula
- Scientific career
- Fields: phytopathology, economic botany, economic mycology
- Institutions: Canadian Department of Agriculture in Harrow, Ontario; Garrett lab, Cambridge Botany School; United Fruit, La Lima; Department of Plant Path., UF; Div. Trop. Res., UF; Div. Trop. Res., SIATSA, United Brands; Hond. Found. Ag. Res. (FHIA); board, Coll. Ag. Sci. Prof. Hond.; board trust., Intern. Net. Improv. Ban. Plantain, CGIAR
- Thesis: The Black Rootrot Disease of Tobacco: Studies on the Causal Organism Thielaviopsis Basicola (1950)
- Doctoral advisor: D. L. Bailey

Robert Harry Stover (2 December 1926 – 25 February 2003) was a Canadian-Honduran phytopathologist specializing in Musa crops and their fungal diseases.

Stover graduated from University of Guelph with a B.S. in agricultural bacteriology in 1947, from 1949 to 1951 a phytopathologist for the Canadian Department of Agriculture in Harrow, Ontario, specifically being head of their investigations of tobacco diseases. During the winters of those years he was a graduate student of D. L. Bailey at University of Toronto, and in 1950 he received a PhD in phytopathology and mycology. He moved the next year to La Lima, Honduras, to work for United Fruit on Fusarium oxysporum f. sp. cubense/Panama disease.

Stover did a sabbatical at what was then called the Cambridge Botany School in the 1960s, at the lab of Denis Garrett. During this time he became perhaps the most renowned researcher on Foc, and wrote Fusarial Wilt (Panama Disease) of Bananas and Other Musa Species.

From 1961 to 1974 he was chief of the Department of Plant Pathology of United. (Although Luis Sequeira visited, asked to work for him, and was indeed hired, he would end up never working for Stover and instead found something more interesting at another UF division elsewhere.) During this time Stover became interested in Mycosphaerella musicola/Sigatoka leaf spot, and then its congener M. fijiensis/black sigatoka when it arrived in the Americas. Briefly in 1969 and 1970 he was on the governing board of the College of Agricultural Science Professionals of Honduras and was one of the founding members of the board of trustees of the International Network for the Improvement of Banana and Plantain, part of CGIAR.

In 1975 Stover was made director of both United Fruit's and the newly formed United Brands-SIATSA's Divisions of Tropical Research. He continued at UF's DTR until 1977, and UB's DTR until 1984 when he joined a non-profit institution newly created by UB's donation of their facilities. This was the Honduras Foundation for Agricultural Research (Fundación Hondureña de Investigación Agrícola, FHIA). Also in 1977, he was made a Fellow the American Phytopathological Society, and in 1983 he was awarded the Award for Contributions to Banana Research by the ACORBAT (the Asociación para la Cooperación en Investigaciones de Banano en el Caribe y en América Tropical). He then "retired" the next year to become a consultant for a large number of banana growers, agrochemical companies, and government agencies throughout Latin America but also in Africa, Australia, and Asia. Also in 1985 he received the Gold Medal of COLPROCAH (the College of Agricultural Science Professionals of Honduras) and the Medal of Honor for Merit of the University of San Pedro Sula.

In 1987 Stover took over the Bananas treatise from N. W. Simmonds, which Simmonds described as being really Stover on Bananas as he had so improved and rewritten it since the previous edition. In Simmonds' opinion Stover's familiarity with bananas had surpassed his own by that point. His works continued to be foundational to any research done on Musa fungal pathology, and to some degree any tropical crop pathology.

In 2001 FHIA's library was renamed the Robert H. Stover Library in his honor.

For the rest of his life he remained an active member of APS, the Canadian Phytopathological Society, the AAAS, COLPROCAH, and ACORBAT, and died on February 25, 2003, near his adopted home of 52 years, La Lima.

== Works ==
- Stover, R. H. (1986). "Disease Management Strategies and the Survival of the Banana Industry". Annual Review of Phytopathology. 24 (1). Annual Reviews: 83–91. doi:10.1146/annurev.py.24.090186.000503. ISSN 0066-4286.
