= Sigatoka disease complex =

The Sigatoka disease complex consists of three fungi of banana:

- Mycosphaerella fijiensis – Black sigatoka
- Mycosphaerella musicola – Yellow sigatoka
- Mycosphaerella eumusae – eumusae leaf spot

== See also ==
- List of banana and plantain diseases
