= Torulosa =

Torulosa may refer to:

- Allocasuarina torulosa (Rose She-Oak or Forest Oak), a tree which grows in sub-rainforest of Queensland and New South Wales, Australia
- Cupressus torulosa, species of cypress
- Deightoniella torulosa, plant pathogen
- Epioblasma torulosa, species of freshwater mussel, an aquatic bivalve mollusk in the family Unionidae, the river mussels
- Fuscoporia torulosa, species of bracket fungus in the Fuscoporia genus, family Hymenochaetaceae
