= Banana production in Ivory Coast =

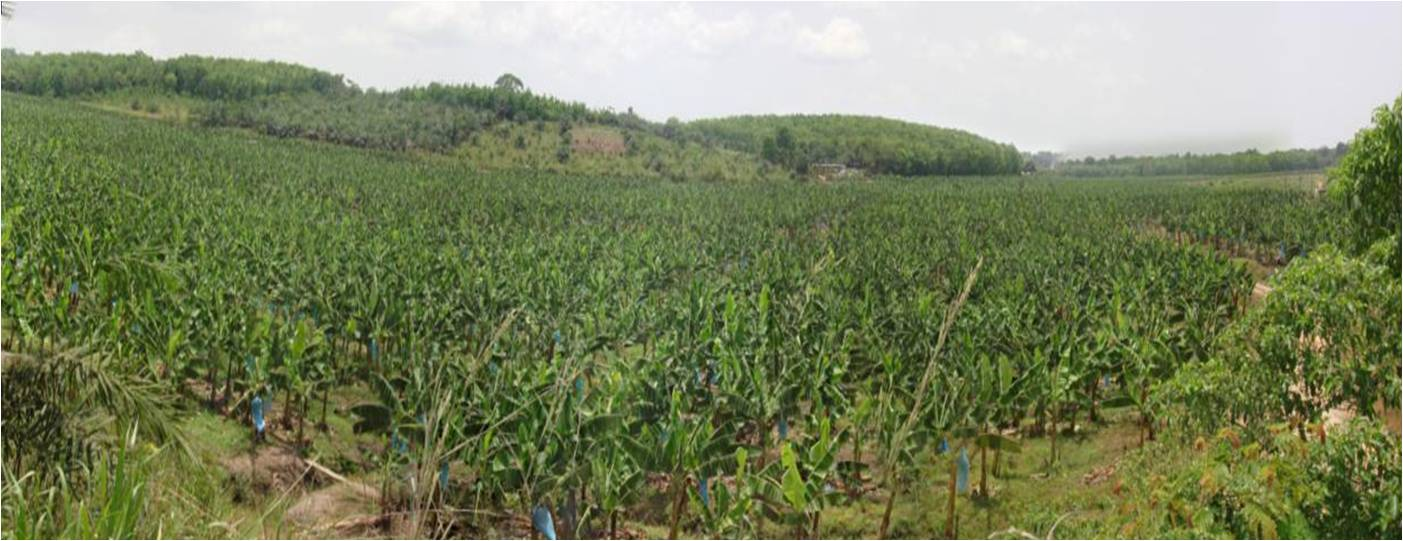
A banana plantation in Ivory Coast

Banana production in Ivory Coast, as in most of Africa, is primarily for local consumption and consists of crops of dessert bananas, cooking bananas grown on open plantations, and intermittent crops from sea level to elevations of 2000 metres above sea level. West Africa is second to Central Africa in banana production in Africa and its use as a staple crop for local residents. Most of the banana crop in Central Africa is for local consumption, bananas being a major foodstuff in this area.

Export banana crops are grown in West Africa, with Ivory Coast and Cameroon being the two African nations that do a sizable export business in bananas, exporting the fresh fruit to Europe. The soils, quantity and distribution of rainfall, and temperatures in equatorial West Africa produce combinations of suitable conditions for banana production.

== Pests ==
- Black Sigatoka
- Yellow Sigatoka
- Septoria leaf spot disease
- Panama disease
- Nematodes
- Insects
