= Banana freckle =

Fungal disease of bananas

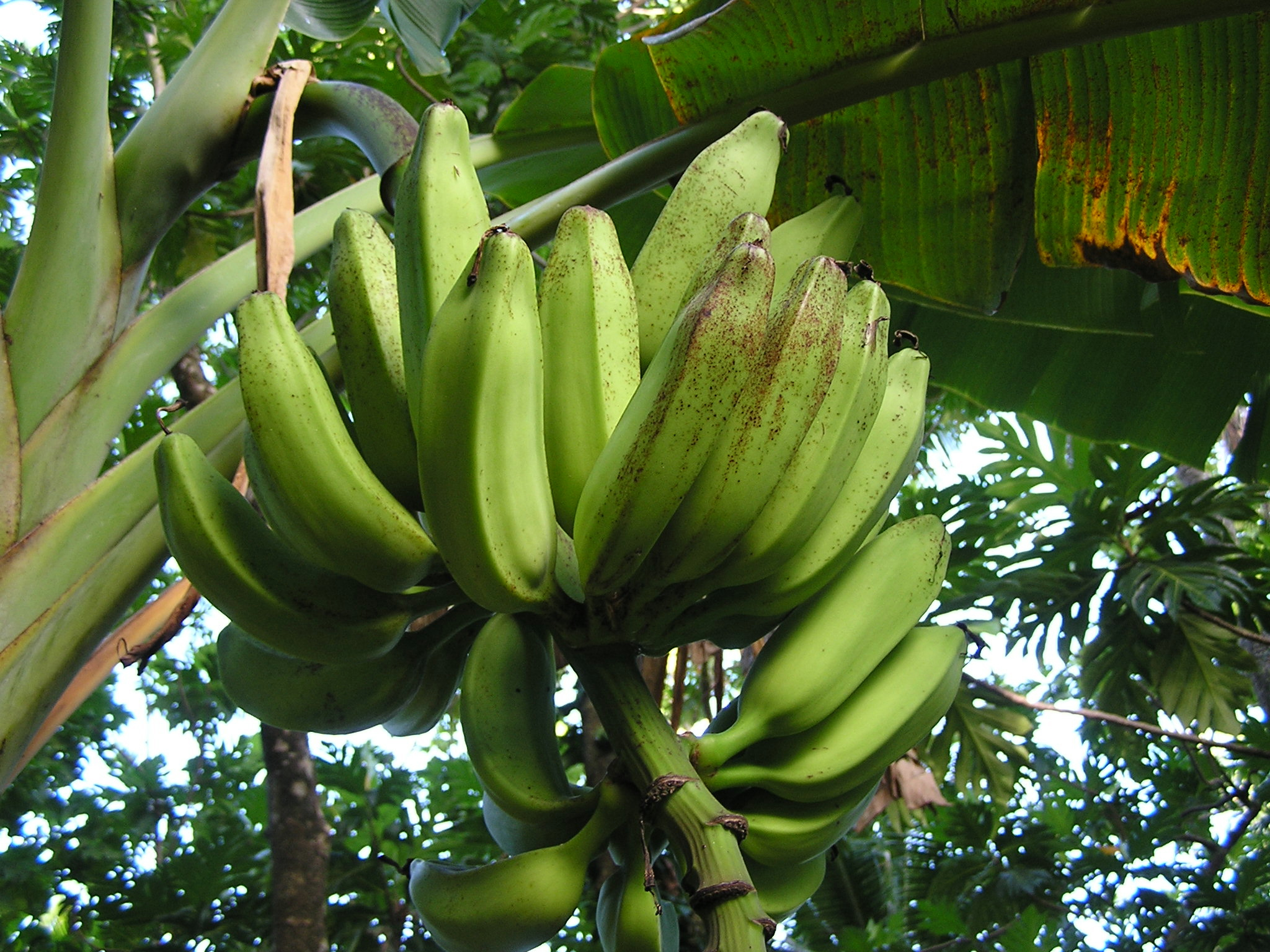
A plant affected by banana freckle

Banana freckle is a disease caused by the fungus Guignardia musae (teleomorph) or Phyllosticta musarum (anamorph). Generally, the causal agent of disease is referred to as Guignardia-Phyllosticta sp. There are several different strains of the fungus that exist to infect different banana varieties around the globe. Symptoms include yellowing of the tissue and formation of small dark brown spots on the leaves and fruit. Within the spots, conidia or pycnidia can be found. Banana freckle is easily propagated and spread from plant to plant by rain splash and movement of infected tissue or fruit. Management of the disease consists of cutting out infected leaves, using the paper bag method, fungicide application, and proper sanitation techniques. This devastating disease is extremely relevant for the major banana exporting countries of the world. In the absence of chemical control, there is about a 78% yield loss. Banana freckle disease needs to be carefully monitored in order to prevent further spread of the disease.

== Hosts and symptoms ==
Several strains of this pathogen exist, and some are species-specific. For example, the fungal strain that infects Australian bananas, Lady Finger and Bluggoe, does not infect Cavendish bananas. Individual strains are found in various locations across the globe (see “Environment” section for more information on pathogen strains). Banana freckle are not known to infect any other types of fruits.

Symptoms typically appear after 2–4 weeks after the banana cluster has opened, and seem to be primarily localized on older leaves. Infected tissues may also yellow with age, and eventually senesce in the most severe case of symptoms. Even in the cases of minor infections, the fungus renders the banana fruit unmarketable at the loss of the grower.

Major macroscopic diagnostic signs include small brown to dark brown specks on leaves and fruits, which indicate the presence of fungal spores protruding through the infected tissues. Depending on which stage (sexual or asexual) the fungus completes its life cycle, the spots will be either pycnidia or conidia. Microscopically, these dark spots, or freckles, can range from 1 millimetre (5/128 in) in diameter to 4 millimetres (5/32 in).

As is the case for most fungal diseases, banana freckle is diagnosed based on the presence of its spores. Fruiting bodies and spores obtained from lesions and fungal cultures are key components when identifying the pathogen. The causal strain of the fungus can then be determined by the type of banana it has infected.

== Disease cycle ==
=== Contact ===
Spores land on banana plants or fruits by rain splash or movement of infected tissue or fruit.

=== Germination and Infection ===
The spores that landed on the plant germinate and as hyphae grow on the outside of the host into masses known as mycelium, they also form appressoria in order to penetrate the host cells. After entering, the hyphae form a haustorium which allows them to absorb nutrients through the plasma membrane of the host cell.

=== Reproduction ===
- Asexual – Phyllosticta musarum – Conidia in Pycnidium
- Sexual – Guignardia musae – Hyphae of opposite mating types undergo plasmogamy and then karyogamy to form ascocarps with asci.

=== Development ===
Dikaryotic hyphae grow and develop ascocarps, where asci develop diploid ascospores which undergo meiosis to become haploid.

=== Dispersal ===
Asci survive in tissue and can be spread to new host by water or movement of infected tissue.

== Environment ==
Banana freckle has been identified in 27 countries. Warm, humid environments like that of Southeast Asia, Australia, and Oceania are ideal growing conditions for the causal genera guignardium and phyllosticta. The high annual precipitation of these tropical areas is also very conducive to the spread of the spores by splash.

Geopolitical Region	Country/Province	Pathogen	Infected Cultivar(s)
Australia	Northern Territory	G. musae, P. musarum, P. cavendishii	Bluggoe, Cavendish
	Queensland	G. musae, P. musarum	Bluggoe, Embul
	New South Wales	G. musae, P. musarum	Bluggoe, Embul
	Western Australia	G. musae, P. musarum	Bluggoe, Embul
	Christmas Island	G. musae	Bluggoe
Oceania	Fiji	G. musae	Bluggoe
	Hawaii	G. musae	Bluggoe
	New Caledonia	G. musae	Bluggoe
	Niue	G. musae	Bluggoe
	Palau	G. musae	Bluggoe
	Papua New Guinea	G. musae	Bluggoe
	Samoa	G. musae	Bluggoe
	Solomon Island	G. musae	Bluggoe
	Tonga	G. musae	Bluggoe
	Vanuatu	G. musae	Bluggoe
South Asia	Bangladesh	G. musae	Bluggoe
	Bhutan	G. musae	Bluggoe
	India	G. musae, P. musarum	Bluggoe, Embul
	Nepal	G. musae, P. musarum	Bluggoe, Embul
	Pakistan	G. musae	Bluggoe
	Sri Lanka	G. musae	Bluggoe, Embul
Southeast Asia	Brunei	G. musae, P. musarum	Bluggoe, Embul
	China (Southeast)	G. musae, P. musarum	Bluggoe, Embul
	Indonesia	G. musae	Bluggoe
	Malaysia	G. musae	Bluggoe
	Myanmar	G. musae	Bluggoe
	Philippines	G. musae	Bluggoe, Cavendish
	Taiwan	G. musae	Bluggoe, Cavendish
	Thailand	G. musae	Bluggoe
	Vietnam	G. musae	Bluggoe

== Management ==
There are a number of control methods to prevent and reduce the banana freckle disease. The paper bag method seems to be the most effective way to gain physical control of the pathogen. The infected leaves are the primary source of spores, and placing a bag over the bananas, once harvested, creates a barrier to prevent inoculum from spreading to the fruit.

Some cultural controls include pruning out infectious plant material, planting in pathogen-free fields, and practicing proper sanitation techniques. In the Philippines, pruning and cutting out patches of infected tissue have prevented the spread of the pathogen in the plant during disease outbreaks. General sanitation practices have also reduced the spread of inoculum. When planters failed to maintain sanitary equipment, seeds, and soil, they witnessed severe fruit infections. The more freckles seen on the leaves of the plant, the more the fruit develops symptoms of the disease. Inversely, less freckles corresponded to less disease.

In addition, multiple fungicides have been seen to reduce banana freckle disease. In Hawaii, spraying the leaves and fruit with maneb (0.01 pounds per US gallon (0.0012 kg/L) water plus 4 ounces (110 g) of sticker-spreader) every 2 weeks or once a month throughout the year has remarkably reduced the spread of inoculum. In Taiwan, spraying fungicides, such as phaltan, orthocide, chlorothalonil, dithiocarbamates, and propiconazole, biweekly have produced effective results against the disease. In the Philippines, chemical controls used against Black or Yellow Sigatoka disease have been helpful. These consist of mancozeb, triazoles, tridemorph, and strobilurin. Mancozeb seems to be the most effective fungicide against banana freckle disease in Hawaii and the Philippines. These fungicides do not eliminate the pathogen completely, but they reduce the inoculum levels and eventually reduce yield loss.

Lastly, eradication of infected plants can prevent further infection of other fruit around the area.

== Importance ==
Banana freckle disease has become a major problem for many countries involved with banana export and production. In the absence of disease management, there is an estimated 78% yield loss. However, the expenses that go toward methods for disease control is 25% of the selling price. Although the fruit is still edible when affected by the disease, market value is reduced. Japan does not tolerate any symptoms and will not purchase any bananas with suspicious blemishes. This causes problems for the exporting business in Taiwan and the Philippines.

Banana freckle was first identified in Hawaii in 1917 and then soon after in the Philippines. The disease is most common in Hawaii, Indonesia, Thailand, Taiwan, and New Guinea to name a few. This devastating fungal disease can infect the leaves during any stage of the plant’s life cycle. In July 2013, Phyllosticta cavendishii (banana freckle) was detected in the Northern Territory on the Cavendish variety of bananas on two rural properties. In January 2019, after a successful eradication program, absence of banana freckle has been declared for Australia (exclusive of external territories).
