= Goldfinger banana =

Edible fruit cultivar

Musa 'FHIA-01 Goldfinger'
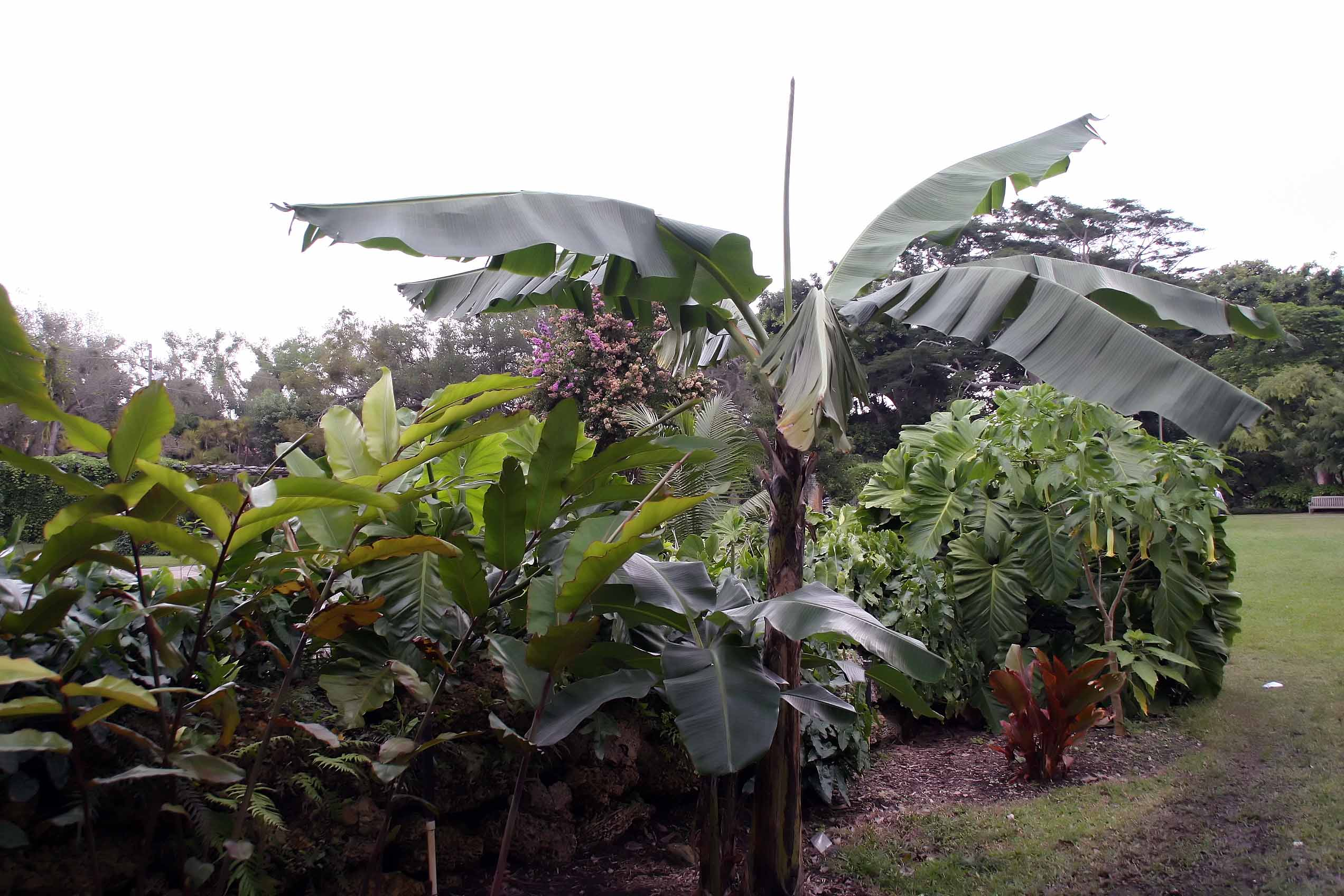
- Hybrid parentage: Musa acuminata × Musa balbisiana hybrid, Musa (AAB) 'Prata-anã' × SH-3142
- Cultivar group: AAAB Group
- Cultivar: 'FHIA-01 Goldfinger'
- Origin: Honduras

The Goldfinger banana (FHIA-01) is a banana cultivar developed in Honduras. The cultivar, developed at the Honduran Foundation for Agricultural Research (FHIA) by a team of scientists led by Phillip Rowe, Franklin Rosales, and Julio Garcia, has been bred to be pest-resistant (specifically against the black sigatoka) and crop-yielding.

== Taxonomy ==
The FHIA-01 Goldfinger banana is a tetraploid (AAAB) hybrid of the cultivar Musa acuminata × balbisiana (AAB) 'Prata-anã' (a naturally occurring triploid clone from Brazil), and the cultivar SH-3142.

SH-3142 was developed from a cross between SH-1734 and Musa acuminata (AA) 'Pisang jari buaya' from Papua New Guinea.

SH-1734 in turn, was developed from Musa acuminata (AA) 'Lidi' (from Sumatra), Musa acuminata (AA) 'Sinwobogi' (from Papua New Guinea), and wild seeded Musa acuminata (from the Philippines).

Its full designation is Musa acuminata × balbisiana (AAAB Group) 'FHIA-01 Goldfinger'.

== History ==
The roots of the Goldfinger's development can be traced back to an initiative to develop new banana breeds by the United Fruit Company begun as early as 1959. This was later taken up by the Honduran Foundation for Agricultural Research, supported by organizations such as Canada's International Development Research Centre (IDRC). The initiative drew on the gene pool of more than 800 banana cultivars from Southeast Asia. Throughout the development of the banana, the developers took the view that conventional hybridization is more important than alternative means, such as genetic engineering.

The first big breakthrough came in 1977, with the development of a hybrid which provided a good banana bunch size, and was resistant to both burrowing nematode and Race 4 of Panama disease. The banana's pest-resistance, further improved later, has environmental and economic benefits.

The Goldfinger was unveiled in Canada in 1994 by the IDRC.

== Growing ==
The Goldfinger takes longer than other banana varieties to mature, but is more resistant to cold, wind and pestilence. It grows to 4.3 meters (14 feet).

== Consumption ==
Though the Goldfinger is edible while still green (in the form of chips, for instance), it is most appealing to Western markets when ripe. In this form, the Goldfinger's stated aim is to replace the much more popular Cavendish banana, which is essentially the sole dessert banana sold in North American, European and New Zealand markets. Since its launch, the Goldfinger has caught on in certain markets—notably Australia—but has yet to do so in North America and Europe.

== See also ==
- Banana
- Banana cultivar groups
- Musa balbisiana
- Musa acuminata
- Plantain
