= BVX =

BVX or bvx can refer to:

- Banana virus X, a virus that infects banana and plaintain plants
- Bole language (Bantu), a language spoken in Likouala Department, Republic of Congo, by ISO 639 code
- Batesville Regional Airport, a public airport in Batesville, Arkansas, U.S., by IATA code
- Lepadellidae, a family of microorganisms, by Catalogue of Life identifier
- Bhun railway station, a train station in Sindh, Pakistan
