= Jean Beagle Ristaino =

American scientist

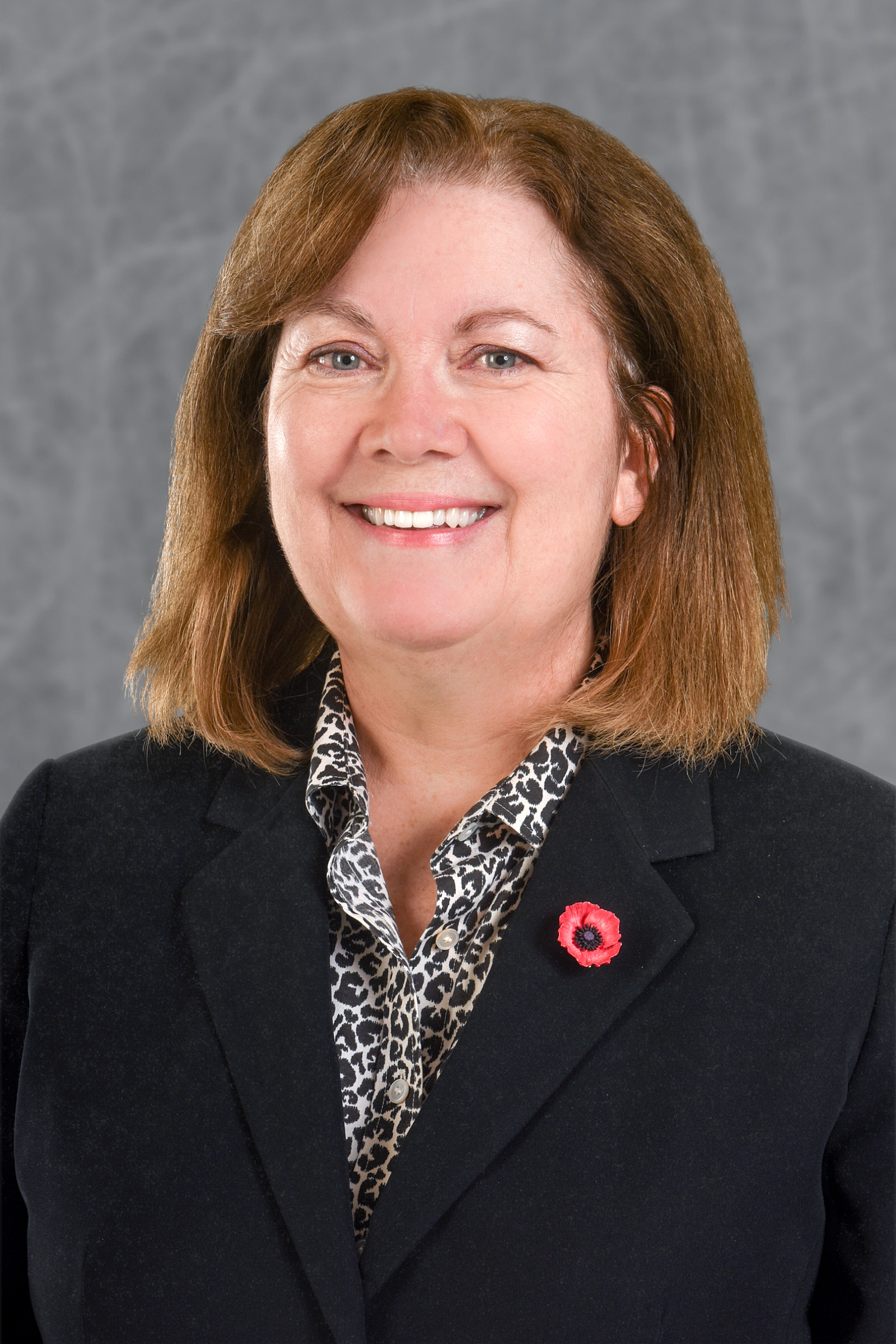
Jean Beagle Ristaino

Jean Beagle Ristaino is an American scientist and William Neal Reynolds Distinguished Professor of Plant Pathology. She is best known for research on the epidemiology and population genetics of Oomycete plant pathogens in the genus Phytophthora. Her research on the population genomics of the pathogen Phytophthora infestans, identified the strain of the pathogen that caused the historic 1840's Irish famine.

== Career ==
=== Education ===
Ristaino earned her B.S. degree in biological sciences in 1978 and her M.S. degree in plant pathology in 1982 from the University of Maryland. While working as an undergraduate at the USDA research center, she encountered a massive fungus collection which inspired her to study plant pathology. She earned her Ph.D. from the University of California, Davis in 1987. Since 1987, Ristaino has been on the faculty of North Carolina State University, and she currently holds the rank of William Neal Reynolds Distinguished Professor. Ristaino retired in 2025.

Ristaino served as the director of the “Emerging Plant Disease and Global Food Security” cluster at NC State through 2024.

=== Research ===
Ristaino's lab at NC State works on emerging plant diseases that threaten global food security. A major focus of research is to understand the factors that contribute to disease emergence including the epidemiology and population genetics of Oomycete plant pathogens in the genus Phytophthora.

In 2001, Ristaino identified the Ia strain of Phytophthora infestans as the pathogen that caused the Great Famine of Ireland in the 1840s, and not the Ib haplotype, long thought to be the cause of the famine. The researchers compared 186 DNA specimens from late blight epidemics in Ireland, the United States, and Europe, dated from 1845 to 1982. Eighty-six percent of the specimens, collected from blighted plants, were infected by the Ia haplotype. The Ib haplotype, previously suspected responsible for the Irish famine, was found only in modern samples from Central and South America. This research result was confirmed in 2014 when researchers examined the leaves preserved from 1847 at London's Kew Gardens; the pathogen derived from leaves from the Irish blight were haplotype Ia.

Ristaino studied the population genetics and migrations of both historic and present day strains of the pathogen. Her lab was part of a multi-national investigator group that sequenced the genome of the pathogen, Phytophthora infestans. The research team used the genome sequence to develop novel strategies for managing disease in the field. Her team developed a web portal called USAblight.org that can be used to track recent outbreaks of disease using geospatial analytics. She also works on other pathogens of tropical crop plants including black Sigatoka on banana, downy mildew of tobacco, soilborne fungi and coffee rust that threaten to infect plants and impact global security.

Ristaino's group developed a pathogen "tree of life" to describe evolutionary history and relationships among 192 described pathogens. Included in this tree of life are genetic sequence data, global locations of each species, plant hosts and where in the host the pathogen resides. This tool allows researchers to add data in real time and aids in tracking pathogens. This program uses the T-BAS tool developed by Ignazio Carbone.

In 2024, Ristaino worked with the Department of Agriculture, Food and the Marine in Celbridge Ireland and with Richard O'Hanlon to demonstrate a field detection system which allows users to detect P. infestans in 15–20 minutes. This detection, called a LAMP assay is a modification of a PCR technique using loop mediated isothermal amplification. They will employ a different LAMP assay to determine presence of two other species, P. kernoviae and P. ramorum in an effort to protect other plants in Ireland.

== Awards and honors ==
In 2012–2017, Ristaino served as a Jefferson Science Fellow in the Bureau for Food Security of the United States Agency for International Development (USAID). In 2016, she received the Excellence in International Service Award from the American Phytopathological Society. In 2019 she was awarded the Global Engagement Award from NC State University.

Ristaino received a Fulbright European Research Scholar award to work with the University of Catania on late blight in Italy in 2018. From 2021 to 2024, she was a Fulbright Scholar in Ireland. In August 2020, she was elected a Fellow of the American Phytopathological Society and named a AAAS Fellow in November, 2020.

== Books ==
Pioneering women in plant pathology. Jean Beagle Ristaino (ed.) St. Paul, MN, USA : APS Press ( http://www.apsnet.org ), 2008 ISBN 978-0-89054-359-7

Emerging Plant Diseases and Global Food Security, Jean Beagle Ristaino (ed) St. Paul, MN, USA : APS Press 0890546371
