= Haplobasidion =

Scientific classification
- Domain: Eukaryota
- Kingdom: Fungi
- Division: Ascomycota
- Class: Sordariomycetes
- Order: Hypocreales
- Genus: Haplobasidion; Erikss., 1889

Genus of fungi

Haplobasidion is a genus of fungi belonging to the order Hypocreales, unknown family.

The species of this genus are found in Europe.

Species:

- Haplobasidion himalayense J.N.Kapoor & Munjal
- Haplobasidion indicum V.G.Rao & D.Rao
- Haplobasidion lelebae Sawada ex M.B.Ellis
- Haplobasidion musae M.B.Ellis
- Haplobasidion thalictri Erikss.
