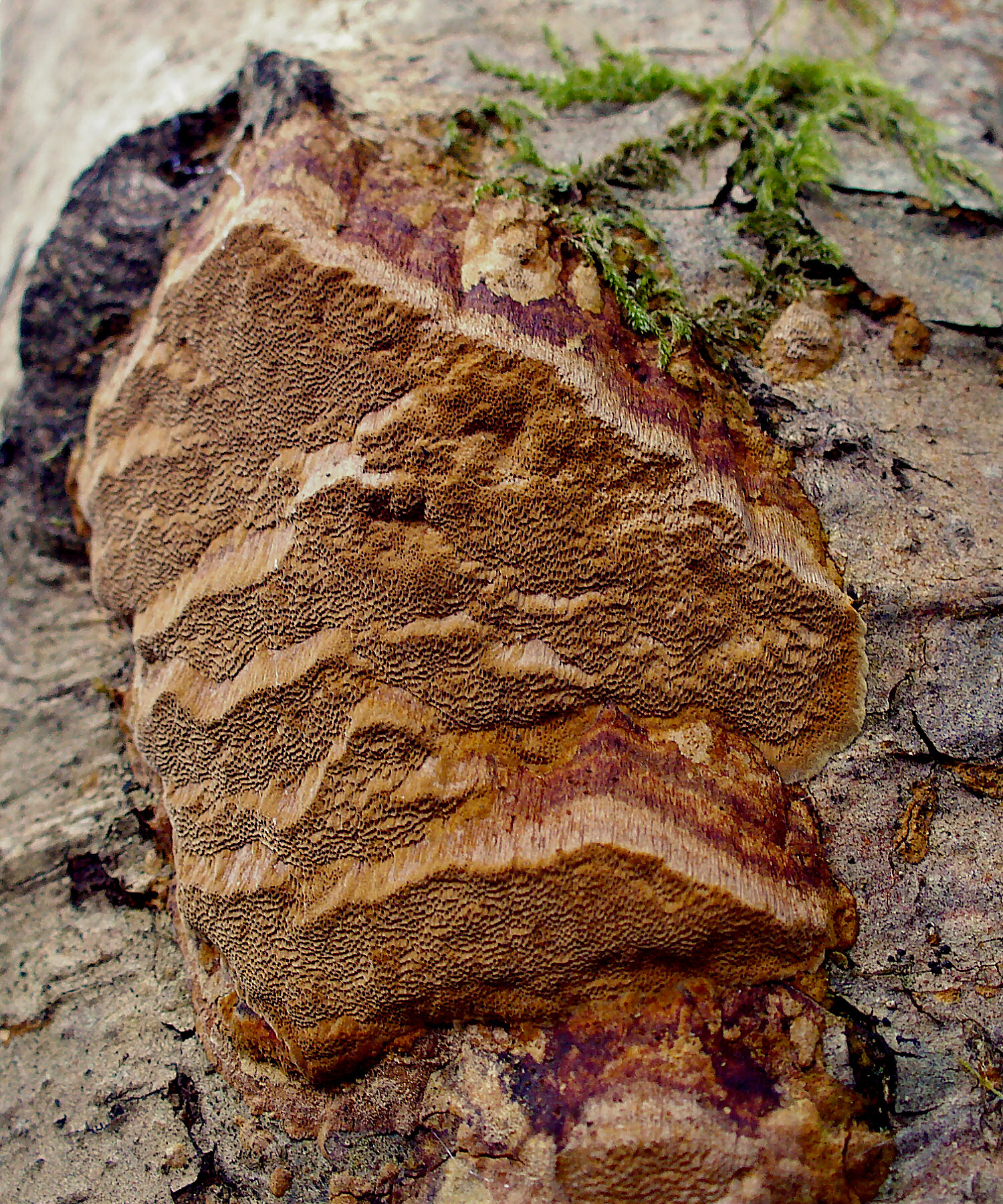
- Fuscoporia ferruginosa

Scientific classification
- Domain: Eukaryota
- Kingdom: Fungi
- Division: Basidiomycota
- Class: Agaricomycetes
- Order: Hymenochaetales
- Family: Hymenochaetaceae
- Genus: Fuscoporia; Murrill (1907)

Type species
- Fuscoporia ferruginosa (Schrad.) Murrill (1907 )

= Fuscoporia =

Genus of fungi

Fuscoporia is a genus of polypore fungi in the family Hymenochaetaceae. It was circumscribed by American mycologist William Alphonso Murrill in 1907.

== Species ==
The following species are recognised in the genus Fuscoporia:

- Fuscoporia acutimarginata Y.C. Dai & Q. Chen (2019)
- Fuscoporia altocedronensis (Murrill) Bondartseva & S. Herrera (1992)
- Fuscoporia ambigua P. Du, Q. Chen & J. Vlasák (2020)
- Fuscoporia americana Y.C. Dai, Q. Chen & J. Vlasák (2019)
- Fuscoporia atlantica Motato-Vásq., R.M. Pires & Gugliotta (2015)
- Fuscoporia australasiatica Q. Chen, F. Wu & Y.C. Dai (2020)
- Fuscoporia australiana Q. Chen, F. Wu & Y.C. Dai (2020)
- Fuscoporia bambusae Q. Chen, F. Wu & Y.C. Dai (2020)
- Fuscoporia bambusicola (L.W. Zhou & B.S. Jia) Q. Chen, F. Wu & Y.C. Dai (2020)
- Fuscoporia bifurcata Baltazar, Trierv.-Per., Log.-Leite & Ryvarden (2009)
- Fuscoporia callimorpha (Lév.) Groposo, Log.-Leite & Góes-Neto (2007)
- Fuscoporia caymanensis J. Vlasak (2020)
- Fuscoporia centroamericana Y.C. Dai, Q. Chen & J. Vlasák (2019)
- Fuscoporia chinensis Q. Chen, F. Wu & Y.C. Dai (2020)
- Fuscoporia chrysea (Lév.) Baltazar & Gibertoni (2010)
- Fuscoporia contigua (Pers.) G. Cunn. (1948)
- Fuscoporia contiguiformis (Pilát) Raymundo, R. Valenz. & Esqueda (2013)
- Fuscoporia coronadensis (Rizzo, Gieser & Burds.) Raymundo, R. Valenz. & Cifuentes (2013)
- Fuscoporia costaricana Y.C. Dai, Q. Chen & J. Vlasák (2019)
- Fuscoporia discipes (Berk.) Y.C. Dai & Ghob.-Nejh. (2007)
- Fuscoporia eucalypti Q. Chen, F. Wu & Y.C. Dai (2020)
- Fuscoporia ferrea (Pers.) G. Cunn. (1948)
- Fuscoporia ferruginosa (Schrad.) Murrill (1907)
- Fuscoporia flavomarginata (Murrill) Groposo, Log.-Leite & Góes-Neto (2007)
- Fuscoporia formosana (T.T. Chang & W.N. Chou) T. Wagner & M. Fisch. (2002)
- Fuscoporia gilva (Schwein.) T. Wagner & M. Fisch. (2002)
- Fuscoporia insolita Spirin, Vlasák & Niemelä (2014)
- Fuscoporia karsteniana Q. Chen, F. Wu & Y.C. Dai (2020)
- Fuscoporia latispora Y.C. Dai, Q. Chen & J. Vlasák (2019)
- Fuscoporia licnoides (Mont.) Oliveira-Filho & Gibertoni (2020)
- Fuscoporia longisetulosa (Bondartseva & S. Herrera) Bondartseva & S. Herrera (1992)
- Fuscoporia marquesiana Gibertoni & C.R.S. de Lira (2020)
- Fuscoporia mesophila Raymundo, R. Valenz. & Pacheco (2013)
- Fuscoporia monticola Y.C. Dai, Q. Chen & J. Vlasák (2019)
- Fuscoporia plumeriae Q. Chen, F. Wu & Y.C. Dai (2020)
- Fuscoporia pulviniformis Tchotet, M.P.A. Coetzee, Rajchenb. & Jol. Roux (2020)
- Fuscoporia ramulicola Y.C. Dai & Q. Chen (2019)
- Fuscoporia rhabarbarina (Berk.) Groposo, Log.-Leite & Góes-Neto (2007)
- Fuscoporia roseocinerea (Murrill) Q. Chen, F. Wu & Y.C. Dai (2020)
- Fuscoporia scruposa (Fr.) Gibertoni & Oliveira-Filho (2020)
- Fuscoporia semiarida Lima-Júnior, C.R.S. de Lira & Gibertoni (2020)
- Fuscoporia senex (Nees & Mont.) Ghob.-Nejh. (2007)
- Fuscoporia septiseta Y.C. Dai, Q. Chen & J. Vlasák (2019)
- Fuscoporia setifera (T. Hatt.) Y.C. Dai (2010)
- Fuscoporia shoreae Q. Chen, F. Wu & Y.C. Dai (2020)
- Fuscoporia sinica Y.C. Dai, Q. Chen & J. Vlasák (2019)
- Fuscoporia subchrysea Q. Chen, F. Wu & Y.C. Dai (2020)
- Fuscoporia subferrea Q. Chen bis & Yuan Yuan (2017)
- Fuscoporia torulosa (Pers.) T. Wagner & M. Fisch. (2001)
- Fuscoporia undulata (Murrill) Bondartseva & S. Herrera (1992)
- Fuscoporia valenzuelae Raymundo (2021)
- Fuscoporia wahlbergii (Fr.) T. Wagner & M. Fisch. (2001)
- Fuscoporia xerophila Raymundo, R. Valenz. & Esqueda (2013)
