= N. W. Simmonds =

British botanist (1922–2002)

Norman Willison Simmonds FRSE FIB FLS (5 or 15 December 1922 – 4 January 2002) was a British botanist. He was a world authority on the cultivation of bananas. He was the first non-American to be awarded the Bronx-based Society for Economic Botany's Distinguished Economic Botanist Award.

== Early life and education ==
He was born in Bedford on 5 or 15 December 1922 the son of a civil servant. He was educated at Whitgift School from 1934 to 1940. He won a scholarship to study natural sciences at the Downing College, Cambridge, and then in 1943 won a further scholarship to study at the Imperial College of Tropical Agriculture on the island of Trinidad. In 1945, the college invited him to begin lecturing in botany. He received an M.A. in 1948.

== Career ==
Simmonds was later Senior Cytogeneticist at the Banana Research Section on the island. During this time, he collected banana samples in East Africa in 1948 and further samples in Asia and Malaysia in 1954/5. From 1959 to 1965 he was the head of the Potato Genetics Department of the John Innes Institute. In 1965 he became Director of the Scottish Plant Breeding Station which was then in Pentlandfield, a suburb of Edinburgh.

== Awards and honours ==
The University of Cambridge awarded him with a doctorate (DSc) in 1966. On March 2, 1970, he was elected a Fellow of the Royal Society of Edinburgh. His proposers were Sir David Lowe, Sir Stephen John Watson, Hugh Paterson Donald and Noel Farnie Robertson. In 1975, he was made an Honorary Professor of the University of Edinburgh.

== Death ==
He died in Edinburgh on 4 January 2002.

== Publications ==
=== Books ===
- Taxonomy and Origins of the Cultivated Banana (1955)
- Bananas (1959, 1966, and with Robert Stover in 1987)
- Variability in Crop Plants (1962)
- Evolution of Bananas (1962)
- Evolution of Crop Plants (1976, ed. and author)
- Principles of Crop Improvement (1979); 2nd edition with coauthor J. Smartt (1999)
- Plant Breeding: The State of the Art (1983)
- Early Scottish Angling Literature (1997)

=== Articles ===
- Simmonds, N. W.; Malcolmson, J. F. (1967). "Resistance to late blight in Andigena potatoes". European Potato Journal. 10 (3). European Association for Potato Research (Springer): 161–166. doi:10.1007/bf02364425. ISSN 0367-1216. S2CID 36514330.
- Simmonds, N. W. (1986). "Theoretical aspects of synthetic/Polycross populations of rubber seedlings". Journal of the Rubber Research Institute of Malaysia. 1 (1): 1–15. ISSN 0127-7065. S2CID 88782520. AGRIS id MY8605599.
- Simmons, N. W. (1994). "Horizontal resistance to cocoa diseases". Cocoa Growers' Bulletin (47): 42–52. ISSN 0045-7256. CABI ISC 19952307374.

The standard author abbreviation N.W.Simmonds is used to indicate this person as the author when citing a botanical name.
