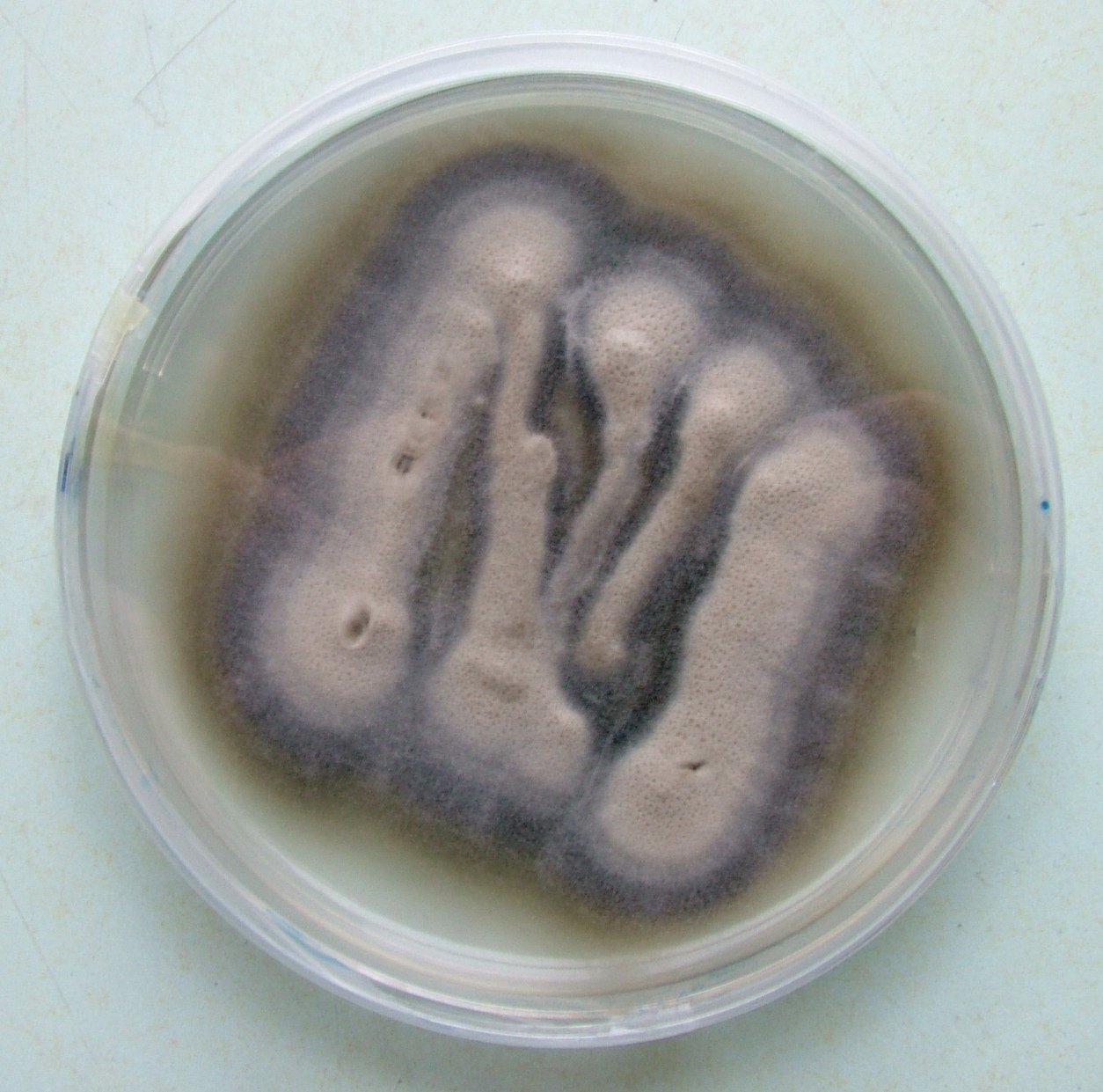

Scientific classification
- Kingdom: Fungi
- Division: Ascomycota
- Class: Sordariomycetes
- Order: Glomerellales
- Family: Plectosphaerellaceae
- Genus: Musicillium
- Species: M. theobromae

Binomial name
- Musicillium theobromae (Turconi) Zare & W. Gams

Synonyms
- Stachylidium theobromae Turconi; Verticillium theobromae (Turconi) E.W. Mason & S. Hughes

= Musicillium theobromae =

Species of fungus

Musicillium theobromae is a plant pathogen infecting banana and plantain.

== See also ==
- List of banana and plantain diseases
