= Phaeoseptoria musae =

Scientific classification
- Kingdom: Fungi
- Division: Ascomycota
- Class: Dothideomycetes
- Order: Pleosporales
- Family: Phaeosphaeriaceae
- Genus: Phaeoseptoria
- Species: P. musae

Binomial name
- Phaeoseptoria musae Punith., (1977)

Species of fungus

Phaeoseptoria musae is a plant pathogen infecting banana and plantain.

== See also ==
- List of banana and plantain diseases
