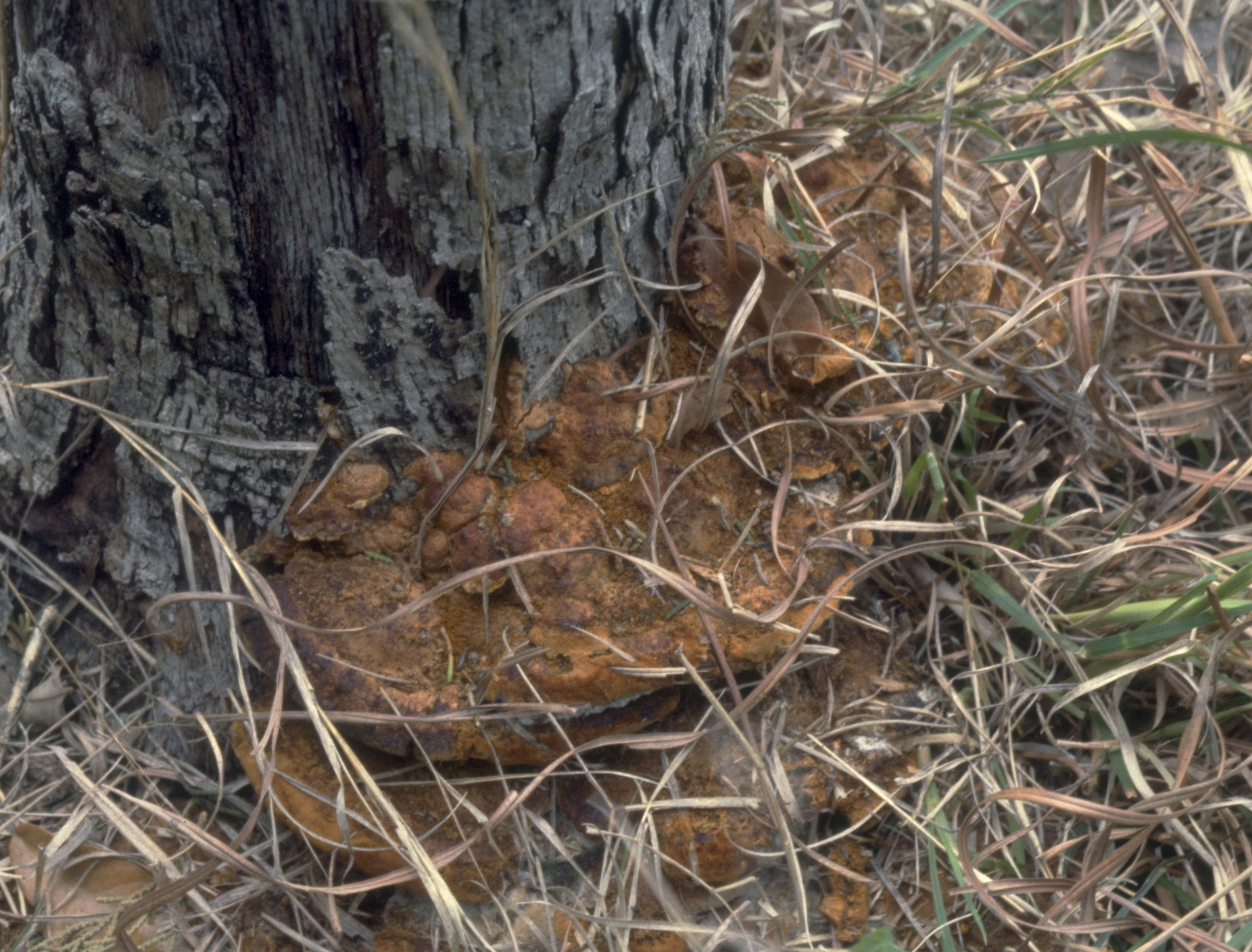
- Fruiting bodies growing on Quercus sp.

Scientific classification
- Kingdom: Fungi
- Division: Basidiomycota
- Class: Agaricomycetes
- Order: Hymenochaetales
- Family: Hymenochaetaceae
- Genus: Fuscoporia
- Species: F. gilva

Binomial name
- Fuscoporia gilva (Schwein.) T. Wagner & M. Fisch. (2002)

Synonyms
- List: Boletus gilvus Schwein. (1822); Polyporus gilvus (Schwein.) Fr. (1828); Mucronoporus gilvus (Schwein.) Ellis & Everh. (1889); Fomes gilvus (Schwein.) Speg. (1898); Phellinus gilvus (Schwein.) Pat. (1900); Hapalopilus gilvus (Schwein.) Murrill (1904); Polystictus rufopictus sensu Spegazzini (1972); Polyporus liquidambaris Schwein. (1828); Polyporus rubiginosus Berk. (1839); Polyporus laurencii Berk. (1859); Fomes rubiginosus Berk. ex Cooke (1885); Polyporus calvescens Berk. (1839); Fomes calvescens (Berk.) Cooke (1885); Scindalma calvescens (Berk.) Kuntze (1898); Polyporus gilvus var. scabrorugosus Berk. (1839); Polyporus omalopilus Mont. (1842); Polystictus omalopilus (Mont.) Fr. (1851); Fomes omalopilus (Mont.) Cooke (1885); Scindalma omalopilum (Mont.) Kuntze (1898); Polyporus flabellum Mont. (1842); Polystictus flabellum (Mont.) Fr. (1851); Microporus flabellum (Mont.) Kuntze (1898); Coriolus flabellum (Mont.) Murrill (1905); Polyporus inamoenus Mont. (1842); Fomes inamoenus (Mont.) Cooke (1885); Polyporus gilvus var. inamoenus (Mont.) Cleland & Cheel (1917); Phellinus inamoenus (Mont.) Ryvarden (1972); Polyporus isidioides Berk. (1843); Trametes isidioides (Berk.) Fr. (1849); Polyporus scruposus var. isidioides (Berk.) Cooke (1885); Mucronoporus isidioides (Berk.) Ellis & Everh. (1889); Polyporus trachodes Lév. (1844); Fomes trachodes (Lév.) Cooke (1885); Scindalma trachodes (Lév.) Kuntze (1898); Polyporus bonplandianus Lév. (1846); Polystictus bonplandianus (Lév.) Cooke (1886); Microporus bonplandianus (Lév.) Kuntze (1898); Coriolus bonplandianus (Lév.) Pat. (1900); Polyporus connexus Lév. (1846); Polystictus connexus (Lév.) Cooke (1886); Microporus connexus (Lév.) Kuntze (1898); Polyporus spurcus Lév. (1846); Polystictus spurcus (Lév.) Cooke (1886); Microporus spurcus (Lév.) Kuntze (1898); Polyporus holosclerus Berk. (1847); Fomes holosclerus (Berk.) Cooke (1885); Scindalma holosclerum (Berk.) Kuntze (1898); Trametes pertusa Fr. (1848); Polyporus carneofulvus Berk. ex Fr. (1851); Fomes carneofulvus (Berk. ex Fr.) F.M. Bailey (1890); Polystictus unguicularis Fr. (1851); Microporus unguicularis (Fr.) Kuntze (1898); Microporellus unguicularis (Fr.) Murrill (1907); Polyporus endozonus Fr. (1851); Fomes endozonus (Fr.) G. Cunn. (1948); Phellinus laurencii (Berk.) Aoshima (1966); Trametes petersii Berk. & M.A. Curtis (1872); Polyporus petersii (Berk. & M.A. Curtis) Sacc. & Trotter (1925); Polyporus ilicincola Berk. & M.A. Curtis (1872); Polystictus ilicincola (Berk. & M.A. Curtis) Cooke (1886); Microporus ilicicola (Berk. & M.A. Curtis) Kuntze (1898); Microporus ilicincola (Berk. & M.A. Curtis) Kuntze (1898); Coriolus ilicincola (Berk. & M.A. Curtis) Murrill (1905); Polyporus caesiellus Ces. (1879); Polystictus caesiellus (Ces.) Sacc. (1888); Microporus caesiellus (Ces.) Kuntze (1898); Polyporus aggrediens Berk. (1880); Polystictus aggrediens (Berk.) Cooke (1886); Microporus aggrediens (Berk.) Kuntze (1898); Polyporus breviporus Cooke (1883); Polystictus breviporus (Cooke) Cooke (1886); Microporus breviporus (Cooke) Kuntze (1898); Polyporus balansae Speg. (1884); Polystictus balansae (Speg.) Sacc. (1888); Mucronoporus balansae (Speg.) Ellis & Everh. (1889); Microporus balansae (Speg.) Kuntze (1898); Polyporus subtropicalis Speg. (1884); Polystictus subtropicalis (Speg.) Sacc. (1888); Microporus subtropicalis (Speg.) Kuntze (1898); Scindalma rubiginosum (Berk. ex Cooke) Kuntze (1898); Polystictus tenuis Link ex Cooke (1886); Polystictus purpureofuscus Cooke (1886); Microporus purpureofuscus (Cooke) Kuntze (1898); Placodes fucatus Quél. (1887); Polyporus fucatus (Quél.) Costantin & L.M. Dufour (1891); Fomes fucatus (Quél.) Sacc. (1891); Scindalma fucatum (Quél.) Kuntze (1898); Xanthochrous fucatus (Quél.) Pat. (1900); Boudiera fucata (Quél.) Lázaro Ibiza (1916); Polystictus proditor Speg. (1889); Microporus proditor (Speg.) Kuntze (1898); Polyporus proditor (Speg.) Bres. (1916); Polyporus aureomarginatus Henn. (1895); Polyporus gilvus var. congregatus E. Bommer & M. Rousseau (1896); Hexagonia vittata Ellis & T. Macbr. (1896); Coriolopsis vittata (Ellis & T. Macbr.) Murrill (1908); Cerrena vittata (Ellis & T. Macbr.) Zmitr. (2001); Polystictus subglaber Ellis & T. Macbr. (1896); Polyporus gilvoides Henn. (1897); Polystictus hybridus Speg. (1898); Microporus tenuis Link ex Kuntze (1898); Mucronoporus sublilacinus Ellis & Everh., Bull (1900); Hapalopilus sublilacinus (Ellis & Everh.) Murrill (1904); Polyporus licnoides var. sublilacinus (Ellis & Everh.) Overh. (1953); Polyporus illiciicola Henn. (1902); Phellinus illiciicola (Henn.) Teng (1963); Phellinus stabulorum Pat. (1907); Fomes stabulorum (Pat.) Sacc. & Trotter (1912); Polyporus stabulorum (Pat.) Lloyd, (1915); Coriolus delectans Murrill (1907); Polystictus delectans (Murrill) Sacc. & Trotter (1912); Fomitiporella demetrionis Murrill (1907); Poria demetrionis (Murrill) Sacc. & Trotter (1912); Pyropolyporus tenuissimus Murrill (1908); Fomes tenuissimus (Murrill) Lloyd (1915); Hapalopilus ramosii Murrill (1908); Polyporus ramosii (Murrill) Sacc. & Trotter (1912); Ganoderma ramosii (Murrill) Sacc. & Trotter; Polystictus ramosii (Murrill) P.W. Graff (1921); Coriolus pertenuis Murrill (1910); Polystictus pertenuis (Murrill) Sacc. & Trotter (1912); Polyporus hookeri Lloyd (1915); Phellinus gilvus var. hookeri (Lloyd) S. Ahmad (1972); Polyporus marcuccianus Lloyd (1915); Polyporus subgilvus Speg. (1915); Polyporus subradiatus Bres. (1916); Polyporus subgilvus Bres. (1920); Polyporus chrysellus Bres. (1920); Polyporus pseudogilvus Lloyd (1920); Trametes keetii Van der Byl (1922); Polyporus ursinulus Lloyd (1922); Polyporus tenuis Link ex Sacc. & Trotter (1925); Phellinus bolaris Pat. (1927); Polyporus gilvus var. sublicnoides Rick (1935)

= Fuscoporia gilva =

Species of fungus

Fuscoporia gilva
- Mycological characteristics
- Pores on hymenium
- No distinct cap
- Hymenium attachment is irregular or not applicable
- Lacks a stipe
- Spore print is yellow
- Ecology is parasitic or saprotrophic
- Edibility is unknown

Fuscoporia gilva, commonly known as the oak conk, is a species of fungal plant pathogen that infects several hosts.

== Description ==
The fruit bodies typically grow in rows of horizontal platforms, which grow over several years and sometimes "smear" onto the wood. The caps are usually semicircular with lumpy margins, 2–15 centimetres (3/4–5 7/8 inches) wide, with zonate colouration ranging from dark brown to light reddish-brown or yellowish at the margin, which is up to 1 cm thick and velvety. There are 5–8 pores per square millimetre. The flesh is tough and corky. The spore print is whitish or yellow.

=== Similar species ===
Mensularia radiata, the alder bracket, is usually found on non-oak hardwoods; fresh specimens often exhibit white-tipped pores near the margin.

== Ecology ==
F.gilva is a plant pathogen that infects several hosts.

It is occasionally eaten by the widespread American pleasing fungus beetle Ischyrus quadripunctatus.

== Uses ==
In traditional Chinese medicine, it is used to treat stomachaches and cancer; polysaccharides isolated from lab-grown F. gilvus have been shown to inhibit the growth of melanoma in a mouse model.

== See also ==
- List of apricot diseases
- List of black walnut diseases
- List of Platanus diseases
- List of sweetgum diseases
- List of peach and nectarine diseases
- List of mango diseases
