= Colletotrichum musae =

Scientific classification
- Domain: Eukaryota
- Kingdom: Fungi
- Division: Ascomycota
- Class: Sordariomycetes
- Order: Glomerellales
- Family: Glomerellaceae
- Genus: Colletotrichum
- Species: C. musae

Binomial name
- Colletotrichum musae (Berk. & M.A.Curtis) Arx, (1957)

Species of fungus

Colletotrichum musae is a plant pathogen primarily affecting the genus Musa, which includes bananas and plantains. It is best known as a cause of anthracnose (the black and brown spots) indicating ripeness on bananas.

== Symptoms ==
Symptoms appear as dark brown/black lesions on green fruit. On yellow fruit these lesions increase in size, orange fungal growth can be found in centre of lesions. Symptoms can also be found on the tips of fruit. Symptoms also include premature ripening of fruit.

== Management ==
The CABI-led programme, Plantwise recommend several methods to prevent the spread of the disease. These include; covering emerging fruit in plastic coverings and avoiding damage during harvest, removal of decaying parts and weeds of non-crop species to reduce favourable humid conditions for fungal infection.

Plantwise also recommends sufficient irrigation and draining of plantations to reduce unnecessary conditions which favour fungi.

== Sources ==
This article incorporates text from a free content work. Licensed under CC-BY-SA (license statement/permission). Text taken from PMDG: Anthracnose on banana, Plantwise, CABI.
