= Honduras Foundation for Agricultural Research =

The Honduras Foundation for Agricultural Research (Fundación Hondureña de Investigación Agrícola or FHIA), (sometimes referred to as Honduras Foundation of Agricultural Research or Honduran Agricultural Research Foundation), is a not-for-profit research facility in La Lima,]], Cortés, Honduras which seeks to develop new disease-resistant breeds of banana and plantain, and carries out research on cacao and other plant species.

Researchers at FHIA developed the FHIA-01 Goldfinger banana, which is resistant to a plant disease which threatens the widely cultivated Cavendish banana. The FHIA-03 Sweetheart banana is already cultivated in Cuba.

It continues the banana research program which the United Fruit Company originally established in 1958.

FHIA is also a participant in the Integrated Watershed Resources Management Program in Honduras financed by USAID.
