= Cordana johnstonii =

Scientific classification
- Kingdom: Fungi
- Division: Ascomycota
- Class: incertae sedis
- Order: incertae sedis
- Family: incertae sedis
- Genus: Cordana
- Species: C. johnstonii

Binomial name
- Cordana johnstonii M.B. Ellis (1971)

Species of fungus

Cordana johnstonii is an ascomycete fungus that is a plant pathogen. It produces cordana leaf spot on bananas.
