= Haplobasidion musae =

Scientific classification
- Kingdom: Fungi
- Division: Ascomycota
- Class: Sordariomycetes
- Order: Hypocreales
- Genus: Haplobasidion
- Species: H. musae

Binomial name
- Haplobasidion musae M.B. Ellis (1957)

Species of fungus

Haplobasidion musae, also known as the Malayan leaf spot, is an ascomycete fungus that is a plant pathogen. It was first described M. B. Ellis in 1957.
