= Zasmidium musigenum =

Scientific classification
- Kingdom: Fungi
- Division: Ascomycota
- Class: Dothideomycetes
- Order: Mycosphaerellales
- Family: Mycosphaerellaceae
- Genus: Zasmidium
- Species: Z. musigenum

Binomial name
- Zasmidium musigenum Videira & Crous

Synonyms
- Ramichloridium musae (M.B. Ellis) de Hoog; Veronaea musae M.B. Ellis

Species of fungus

Zasmidium musigenum is an ascomycete fungus that is a plant pathogen infecting bananas.
