= Leptosphaeria musarum =

Scientific classification
- Domain: Eukaryota
- Kingdom: Fungi
- Division: Ascomycota
- Class: Dothideomycetes
- Order: Pleosporales
- Family: Leptosphaeriaceae
- Genus: Leptosphaeria
- Species: L. musarum

Binomial name
- Leptosphaeria musarum Sacc. & Berl., (1889)

Species of fungus

Leptosphaeria musarum is a plant pathogen.
