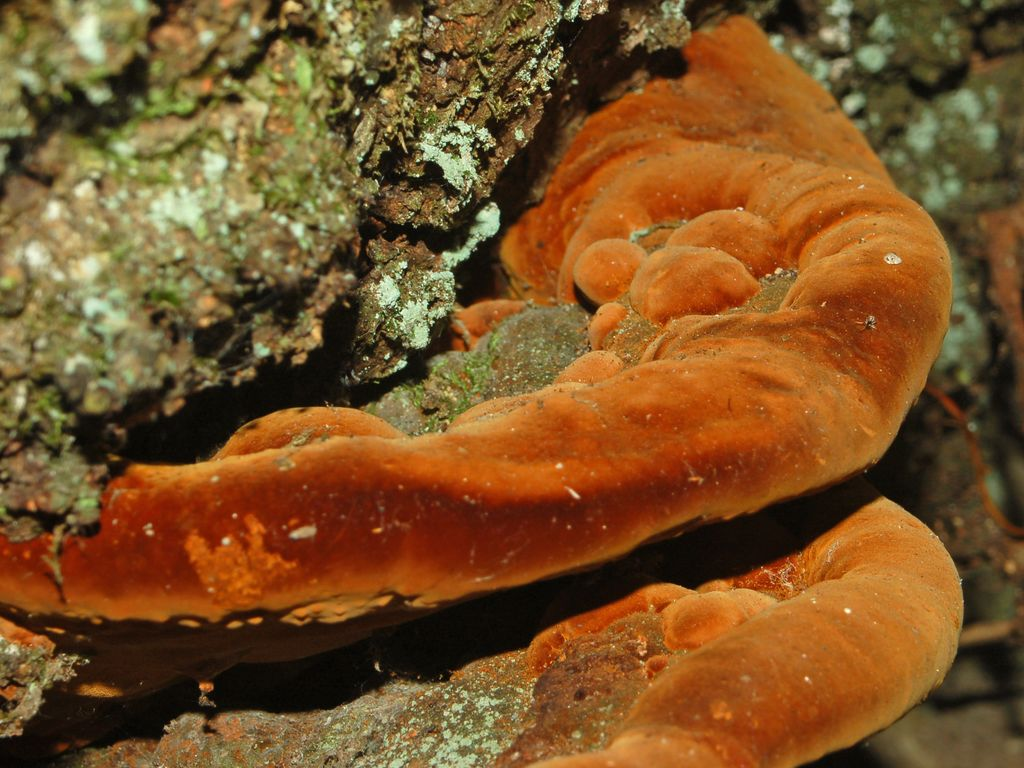
- Fuscoporia torulosa, upperside
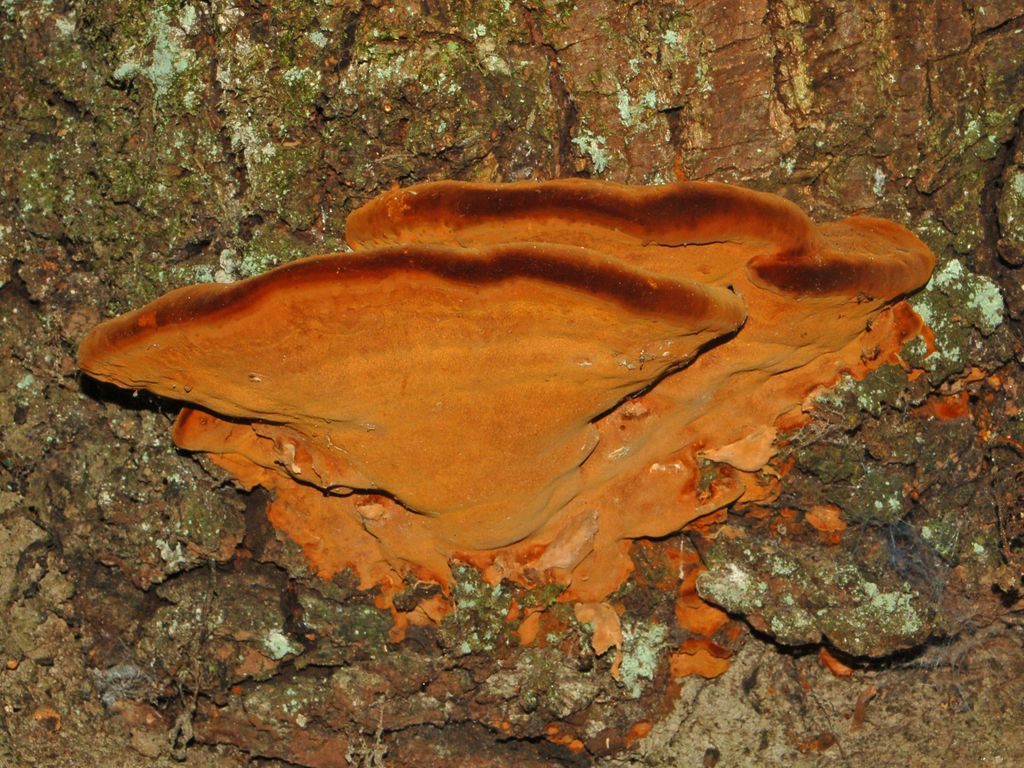
- Underside

Scientific classification
- Kingdom: Fungi
- Division: Basidiomycota
- Class: Agaricomycetes
- Order: Hymenochaetales
- Family: Hymenochaetaceae
- Genus: Fuscoporia
- Species: F. torulosa

Binomial name
- Fuscoporia torulosa (Pers.) T. Wagner & M. Fisch. (2001)

Synonyms
- Phellinus torulosus Bourdot & Galzin; Mucronoporus torulosus (Pers.) Zmitr., Malysheva & Spirin 2006; Fomes castaneae Woron. 1925; Fomes ceratoniae (Lázaro Ibiza) Sacc. & Trotter 1925; Polyporus assimilis Velen. 1922; Pseudofomes ceratoniae Lázaro Ibiza 1916; Boudiera rubripora (Quél.) Lázaro Ibiza 1916; Polyporus marucuccianus Lloyd 1915; Fomes torulosus (Pers.) Lloyd 1910; Fomes rubriporus (Quél.) Bres. & Cavara 1900; Phellinus rubriporus (Quél.) Quél. 1886; Polyporus fuscopurpureus Boud. 1881; Polyporus rubriporus Quél. 1881; Polyporus torulosus (Pers.) Pers. 1825; Boletus torulosus Pers. 1818; Agarico-igniarium tegularium Paulet 1793; Fuscoporia torulosa (Pers.) T. Wagner & M. Fisch. 2001

= Fuscoporia torulosa =

Species of fungus

Fuscoporia torulosa, the tufted bracket, is a species of bracket fungus in the genus Fuscoporia, family Hymenochaetaceae. A wood-decay fungus, it causes a white rot of heartwood in dead and living hardwood trees in Europe, and in coniferous trees in North America.

== Taxonomy ==
Until recently, this species was known as Phellinus torulosus. However, a phylogenetic study in 2001 resulted in the genus Phellinus being split into five new genera, and P. torulosus being renamed to Fuscoporia torulosa.

== Description ==
The fruiting bodies of this species are semicircular or shell-shaped, with dimensions of 12–30 centimetres (4 1/2–12 in) broad by 4–10 cm (1 1/2–4 in) long. The brackets are typically 1–3 cm (1/2–1 in) thick, although it can be considerably thicker at the point of the broad attachment to the tree. Ryvarden and Gilbertson give maximum fruiting body dimensions of 46 cm (18 in) wide by 28 cm (11 in) long by 11 cm (4 1/2 in) thick. The fruiting body margin is rounded, and sometimes wavy, felt-like or tomentose on the flattened upper surface, which is typically orange-brown to rusty-brown in color. The color of the lower pore-bearing surface is cinnamon-, rust-, or olivaceous-brown, and there are 5 to 6 pores per millimetre.

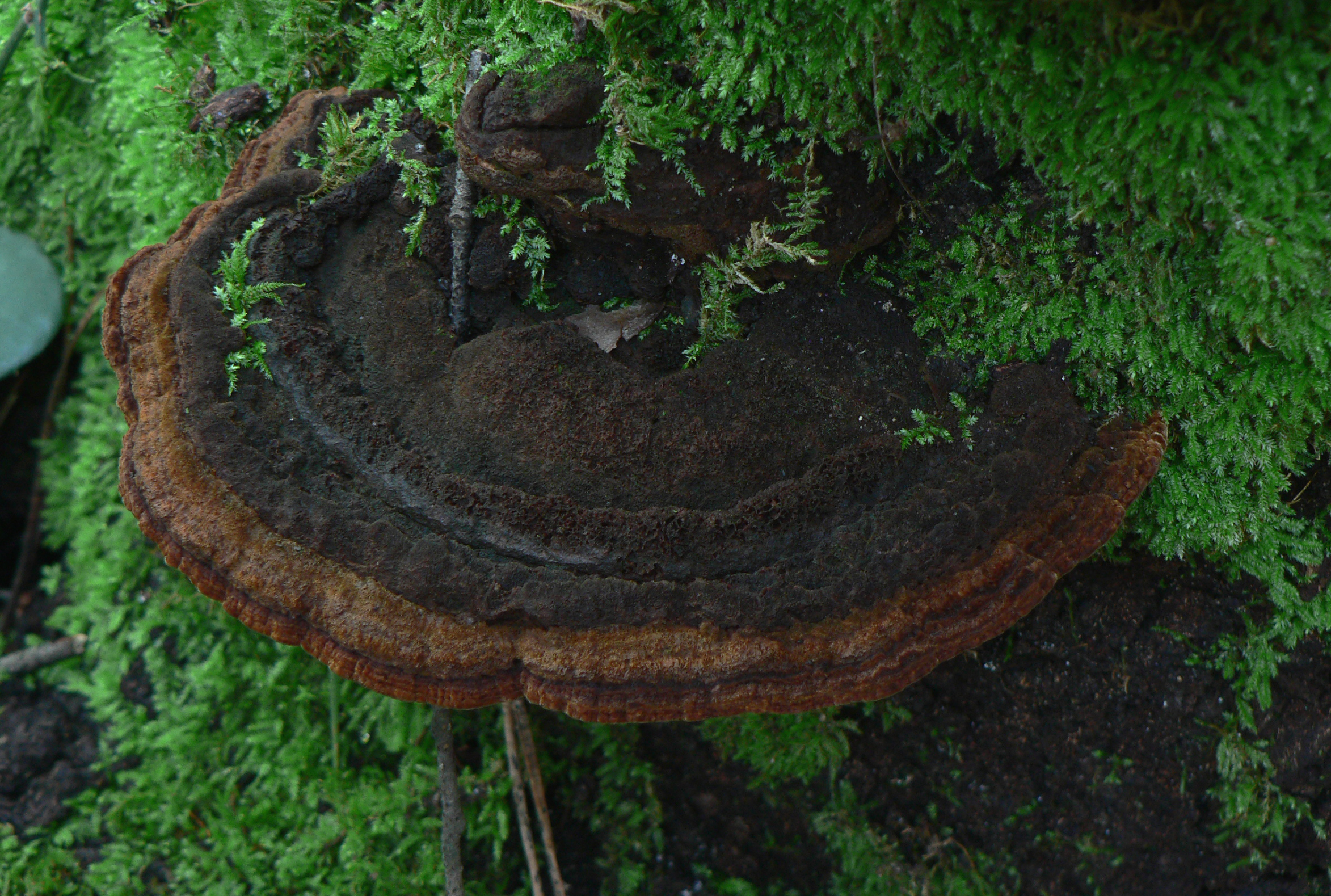
Fuscoporia torulosa

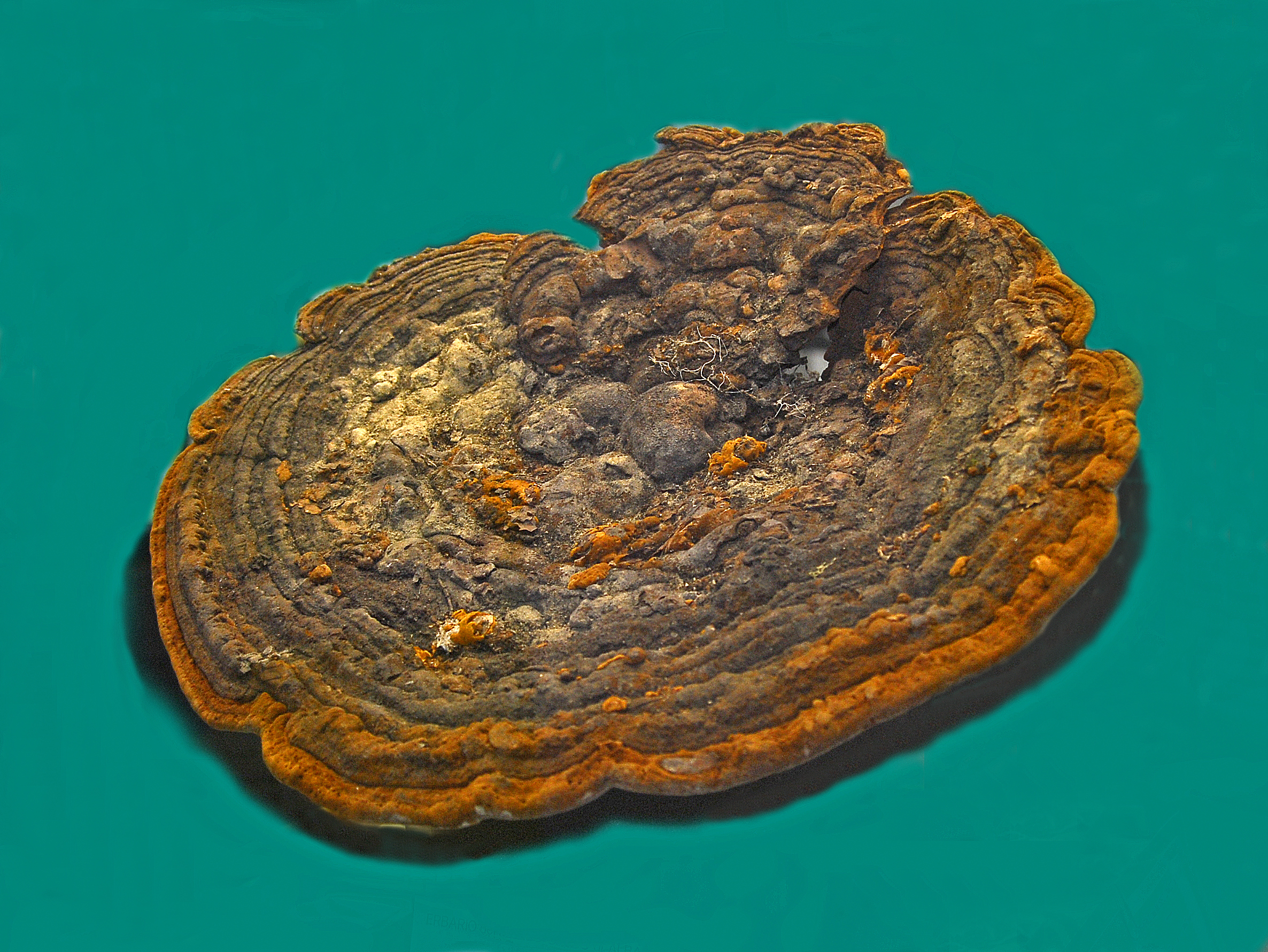
Museum specimen

=== Microscopic features ===
Basidiospores are ovoid or ellipsoid, hyaline, smooth, with dimensions of 4–6 × 3–4 μm. The basidia are club-shaped, 4-spored, with dimensions of 14–16 × 5–6 μm.

=== Modern identification techniques ===
Production of visible fruiting bodies by F. torulosa does not happen until long after the tree has been initially infected, as it takes some time for the fungal mycelia to colonize the host. For this reason it often escapes detection until it is too late to save the tree. In 2007, a rapid detection method was reported that uses DNA technology, specifically the polymerase chain reaction, to enable detection of fungal mycelia in infected tissues in roughly six hours.

== Habitat and distribution ==
Although its preferred host is Quercus, Fuscoporia torulosa has been reported growing on a variety of hardwood trees: Acer, Arbutus, Calluna, Castanea, Celtis, Ceratonia, Cercis, Cistus, Citrus, Cornus, Crataegus, Cydonia, Erica, Eucalyptus, Euonymus, Fagus, Fraxinus, Grevillea, Helianthemum, Juglans, Laurus, Malus, Melaleuca, Morus, Myrtus, Olea, Ostrya, Parrotia, Phillyrea, Pistacia, Pittosporum, Populus, Prunus, Punica, Pryus, Robinia, Rosa, Salix, Spartium, Ulex, Ulmus, Viburnum, Vitis, and more rarely, conifers like Cedrus, Cupressus, Larix, Picea, and Pinus. Recently, F. torulosa has been reported as infecting more than 160 species of plants; most of these infections results in the plant's premature death.
