= Guignardia musae =

Scientific classification
- Kingdom: Fungi
- Division: Ascomycota
- Class: Dothideomycetes
- Order: Botryosphaeriales
- Family: Botryosphaeriaceae
- Genus: Guignardia
- Species: G. musae

Binomial name
- Guignardia musae Racib. (1909)

Synonyms
- Macrophoma musae Phoma musae Phyllosticta musarum Phyllostictina musarum Sphaeropsis musarum

Species of fungus

Guignardia musae is a fungal plant pathogen that causes banana freckle a disease that forms water soaked lesions of banana fruit and is spread by rain splash.
