= Cercospora hayi =

Scientific classification
- Kingdom: Fungi
- Division: Ascomycota
- Class: Dothideomycetes
- Order: Capnodiales
- Family: Mycosphaerellaceae
- Genus: Cercospora
- Species: C. hayi

Binomial name
- Cercospora hayi Calp., (1955)

Species of fungus

Cercospora hayi is a fungal plant pathogen. It can cause the brown spot disease in bananas.
