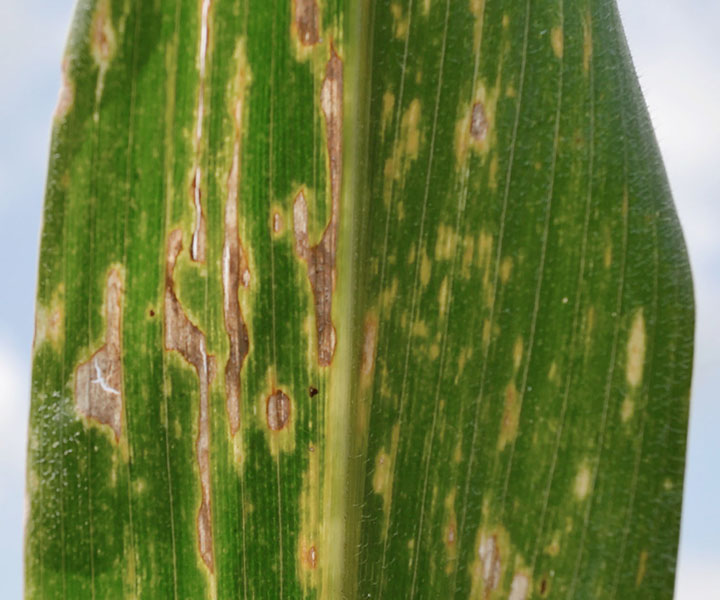
- Typical symptoms of bacterial leaf streak on maize leaf caused by Xanthomonas vasicola pv. vasculorum

Scientific classification
- Domain: Bacteria
- Kingdom: Pseudomonadati
- Phylum: Pseudomonadota
- Class: Gammaproteobacteria
- Order: Lysobacterales
- Family: Lysobacteraceae
- Genus: Xanthomonas
- Species: X. vasicola

Binomial name
- Xanthomonas vasicola Cobb 1894

= Xanthomonas vasicola =

Species of bacterium

Xanthomonas vasicola pv. vasculorum (Xvv) is a gram-negative rod-shaped bacterium which has a single polar flagellum. It is a plant pathogen, causing both bacterial leaf streak of maize (corn) and sugarcane gumming disease. One outbreak in eucalyptus has been reported. Under experimental conditions it can infect sorghum, oats and some grass species. It is not currently a quarantine pathogen in any country, but it has already spread outside its native range and is highly adaptable to different environments.

The means of dispersal are not yet confirmed. Similar Xanthomonas pathogens are spread via wind-blown water droplets, irrigation, agricultural machinery and movement of infected plants. There are no known insect vectors.

Like other members of the Xanthomonas genus, it forms yellow colonies when grown on agar and secretes abundant xanthan exopolysaccharides.

== Bacterial leaf streak of maize ==
Leaf streak of maize was first observed in South Africa in 1949. The disease was then observed in Argentina in 2010 and the USA in 2014. It is now widespread in the USA as well as being found in Brazil, Argentina, Madagascar, South Africa and Zimbabwe.

X. vasicola pv. vasculorum enters maize leaves through the stomata and colonises the intercellular spaces. Visible symptoms are long thin lesions that run parallel to the leaf vein and have wavy or jagged margins. Lesions can be yellow, orange or brown and expand over time. When held up to the sun lesions appear translucent with a yellow halo. In humid conditions polysaccharide ooze may be seen on leaves. It can be diagnosed via microscopy and culturing, or PCR.

== Sugarcane gumming disease ==
Sugarcane gumming disease was first reported in Puerto Rico the 1920s. As with corn, long thin leaf lesions are seen. They may be orange, yellow, brown, grey or white depending on the stage of infection. As the disease progresses the bacteria spreads to the stem via the vascular system. Secretion of exopolysaccharides leads to gumming and vascular ooze which blocks the flow of water and nutrients through the plant. This leads to wilting and if the stem is cut a thick ooze emerges.
