= Banana virus X =

Virus classification
- (unranked): Virus
- Realm: Riboviria
- Kingdom: Orthornavirae
- Phylum: Kitrinoviricota
- Class: Alsuviricetes
- Order: Tymovirales
- Family: Betaflexiviridae
- Genus: incertae sedis
- Virus: Banana virus X

Species of virus

Banana virus X (BVX) is a plant virus that infects members of the genus Musa. Its genome is about 2,900 nucleotides in length and contains five open reading frames that encode for a replication-associated protein, a movement-associated triple gene block and a capsid protein. A polyvalent degenerate oligonucleotide reverse transcription polymerase chain reaction (PDO-RT-PCR) assay has been developed to detect BVX nucleic acid in infected leaves. The virus was originally discovered in Guadeloupe.
