= Deightoniella torulosa =

Scientific classification
- Domain: Eukaryota
- Kingdom: Fungi
- Division: Ascomycota
- Class: Sordariomycetes
- Order: Magnaporthales
- Family: Magnaporthaceae
- Genus: Deightoniella
- Species: D. torulosa

Binomial name
- Deightoniella torulosa (Syd.) M.B. Ellis, (1957)

Synonyms
- deightoniella liti Brachysporium torulosum Cercospora musarum Helminthosporium torulosum

Species of fungus

Deightoniella torulosa is an ascomycete fungus that is a plant pathogen.
