= Black sigatoka =

Scientific classification
- Kingdom: Fungi
- Division: Ascomycota
- Class: Dothideomycetes
- Order: Mycosphaerellales
- Family: Mycosphaerellaceae
- Genus: Mycosphaerella
- Species: M. fijiensis

Binomial name
- Mycosphaerella fijiensis Morelet (1969)

Synonyms
- Pseudocercosporella fijiensis

Pathogenic fungus

Black Sigatoka
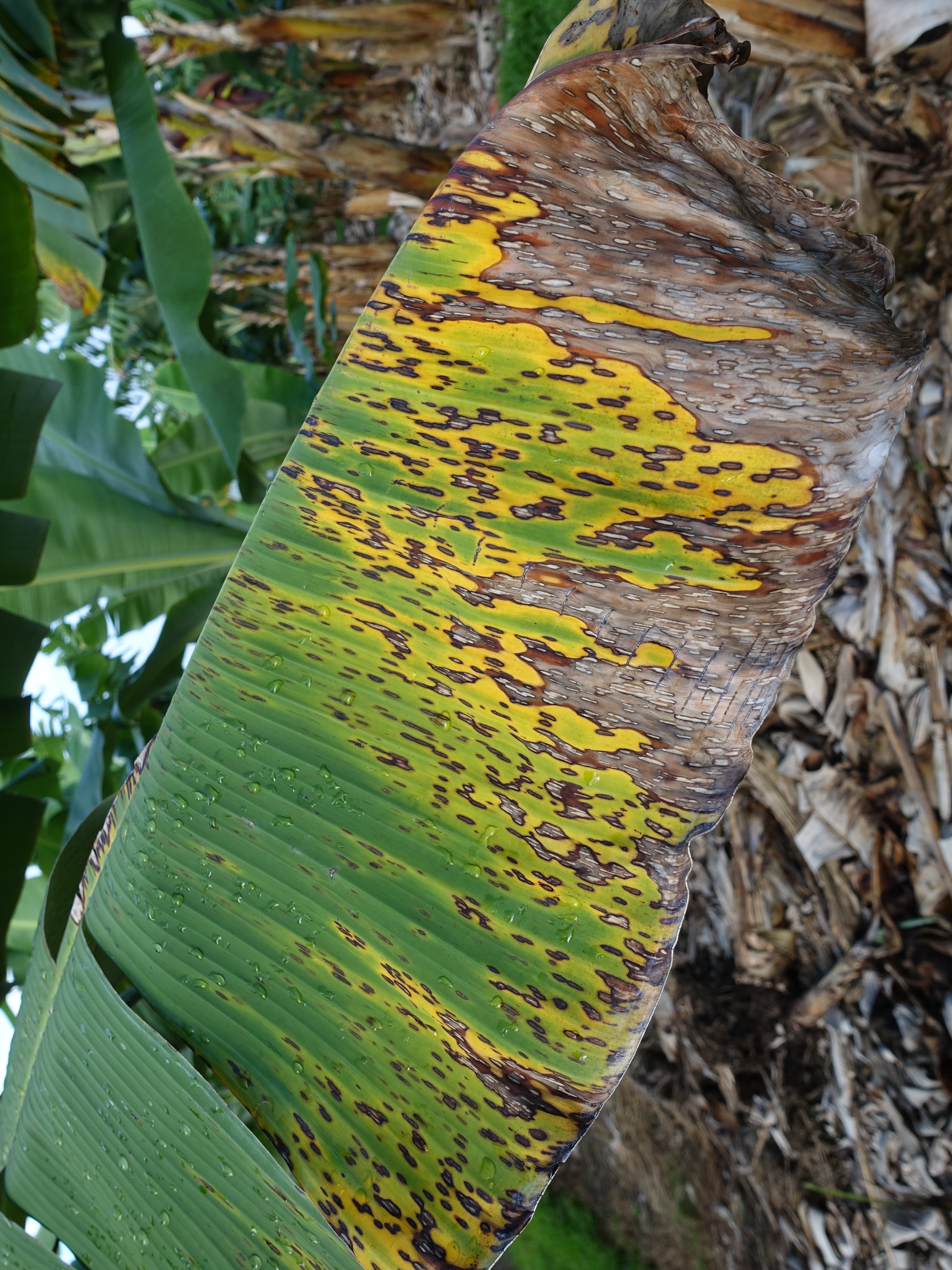
- Advanced lesions
- Common names: Black leaf streak
- Causal agents: Mycosphaerella fijiensis
- Hosts: Banana

Black sigatoka is a leaf-spot disease of banana plants caused by the ascomycete fungus Mycosphaerella fijiensis (Morelet), also known as black leaf streak. It was discovered in 1963 and named for its similarities with yellow Sigatoka, which is caused by Mycosphaerella musicola (Mulder), which was itself named after the Sigatoka Valley in Fiji. In the same valley an outbreak of this disease reached epidemic proportions from 1912 to 1923.

According to new terminology, the Sigatoka disease complex is a cluster of three closely related fungi: Black Sigatoka and its congeners Yellow Sigatoka (Ps. musae) and eumusae leaf spot (Ps. eumusae).

Plants with leaves damaged by the disease may have up to 50% lower yield of fruit, and control can take up to 50 sprays a year.

== Life history ==
M. fijiensis reproduces both sexually and asexually, and both conidia and ascospores are important in its dispersal. The conidia are mainly waterborne for short distances, while ascospores are carried by wind to more remote places (the distances being limited by their susceptibility to ultraviolet light). Over 60 distinct strains with different pathogenic potentials have been isolated. To better understand the mechanisms of its variability, projects to understand the genetic diversity of M. fijiensis have been initiated.

When spores of M. fijiensis are deposited on a susceptible banana leaf, they germinate within three hours if the humidity is high or a film of water is present. The optimal temperature for germination of the conidia is 27 °C (81 °F). The germ tube grows epiphytically over the epidermis for two to three days before penetrating the leaf through a stoma. Once inside the leaf, the invasive hypha forms a vesicle and fine hyphae grow through the mesophyll layers into an air chamber. More hyphae then grow into the palisade tissue and continue on into other air chambers, eventually emerging through stomata in the streak that has developed. Further epiphytic growth occurs before the re-entry of the hypha into the leaf through another stoma repeats the process. The optimal conditions for M. fijiensis as compared with M. musicola are a higher temperatures and higher relative humidity, and the whole disease cycle is much faster in M. fijiensis.

== Symptoms ==
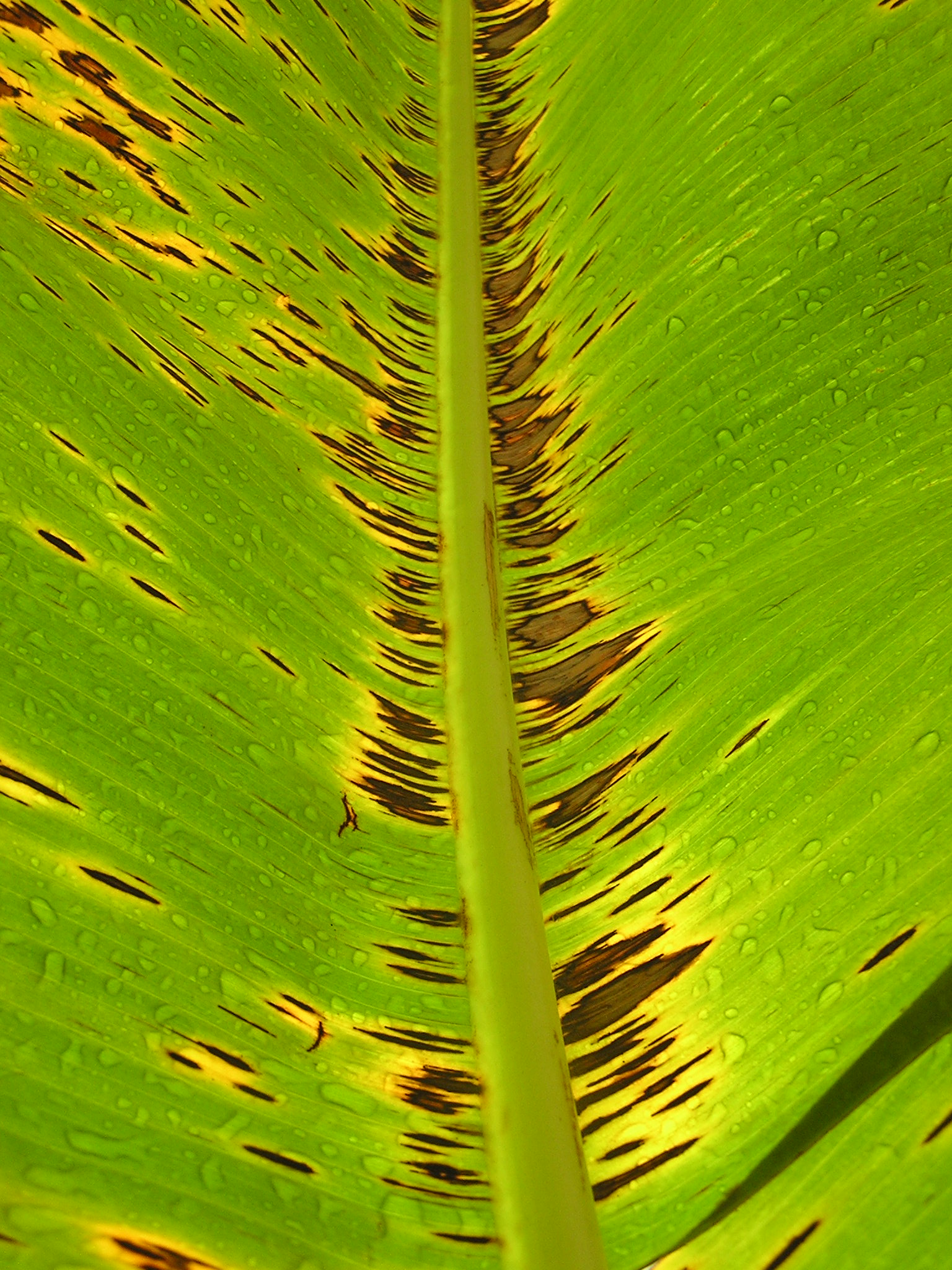
Lesions on mature leaf

Black Sigatoka is also known as black leaf streak, causing streaks that run parallel to the secondary veins of banana leaves. It affects banana trees specifically in tropical climates; including Asia, East and West Africa, Trinidad, Grenada, many Pacific islands, Central America and South America. Tropical weather is the preferred climate for banana cultivation, but it is also the environment where the pathogen thrives: hot and humid, with plenty of rainfall to aid in dispersal. The optimal environment of the pathogen is similar to that of the banana tree. The fungus infects mature banana leaves and will continue to cause infection without proper control.

In the early stages of the infection of the plant, the lesions have a rusty brown appearance and appear to be faint, paint-like specks on the leaves. They become more visible on the undersides of the banana leaf as the lesions and leaves grow. The spots on the undersides of leaf are the fungus itself. The sign of the pathogen consists of the ascocarp which holds the ascospores used for dissemination to infect healthy new plants when the environment is conducive. The pathogen then survives on dead plant tissue as mycelium. The dimensions of the lesions are characteristically 20 by 2 millimetres (3/4 in × 1/8 in) with a well defined wall surrounding it. After further development, they become darker, sink into the leaf, and turn into depressions. The depressions themselves and the chlorosis surrounding them are the visible symptoms of the plant pathogen. They eventually will merge, causing the rapid decline of plant morphological and physiological function. Leaves with large infectious lesions will start to degrade and collapse because the leaf spots interrupt the plant's ability to perform photosynthesis, leading to the ultimate death of the plant.

The yellow leaf streak pathogen is in the same genus as that of black leaf streak. Yellow leaf streak shows smaller, yellow-green lesions that appear on top of the leaves.

== Management ==
There are several ways to control black Sigatoka, either by cultural and chemical means or by genetic engineering. Cultural control includes the destruction of leaves that have been infected with M. fijiensis. This will help reduce the initial (ascospores) and secondary (conidia) spread of inoculum of new plant leaves and interrupt the pathogen's polycyclic disease cycle. Another way of reducing primary/secondary inoculums is via efficient drainage and irrigation. Keeping the environment around the plants at low humidity helps keep the ascospores/conidia produced by the pathogen from being dispersed in the water draining towards other healthy, susceptible hosts. Other techniques include planting the banana trees more than 1,000 metres (3,300 ft) above sea level and practicing multi-cropping, mixing banana with other trees or vegetation.

One form of chemical control is preemptive use of fungicides on banana trees in order to protect them from primary inoculum. The fungicide does not kill the pathogen itself, but works on the pre-necrotic spots on the leaves, stopping the secondary spores from inoculating new, healthy plant tissue. The best time to apply this protective fungicide is in the beginning of the season in order to stop any initial infection. The class of fungicides widely used to control black leaf streak is the triazoles. These are demethylation inhibitors and should be rotated with compounds having other modes of action to slow the development of resistance. Leaves that have already been infected must be removed mechanically to save the rest of the tree. Research has shown that there may be fungicide resistance developing for M. fijiensis. It has been observed that following the intensive application of chemicals, the fungus persisted and spread. The same observations were found in fields with no chemical interference; the belief now being that the untreated fields are "breeding grounds for (the) development of resistant strains". Methyl benzimidazole carbamates are also used and there is also resistance known to these. Although fitness penalties are common in resistance evolution many MBC resistant pathogens do not suffer any penalty and a few have the opposite effect. M. fijiensis is one such case: Romero et al., 1998 find MBC resistant isolates benefit from enhanced virulence (specifically tested with benomyl).

Research today shows continuous action towards reinventing banana breeding programs. However, some cultivars of bananas are resistant to the disease. Research is done to improve productivity and fruit properties of these cultivars. A genetically modified banana variety made more resistant to the fungus was developed and was field tested in Uganda in the late 2000s. Furthermore, the search for genetic resistance shows promise with the discovery of a protein that can produce a hypersensitive response to control M. fijiensis that is being introduced into banana trees. This may lead to the identification of a resistance gene that could be transferred to banana trees.

== Importance ==
The worldwide spread of the disease has been rapid, with its naming and first reported occurrence in 1963. The disease was reported in 1972 in Honduras, from where it spread north to central Mexico and south to Brazil and into the Caribbean islands in 1991. The fungus arrived in Zambia in 1973 and spread to the banana-producing areas of Africa from that introduction. The first occurrence of black Sigatoka in Florida was reported in 1999. As it spread, Black Sigatoka replaced the yellow form and has become the dominant disease of bananas worldwide.

The most likely route of infection is via the importation of infected plant material, and infection can spread rapidly in commercial areas where bananas are farmed in monoculture. Removal of affected leaves, good drainage, and sufficient spacing also help to fight the disease. Although fungicides improved over the years, the pathogen developed resistance. Therefore, higher frequency of applications is required, increasing the impact on the environment and health of the banana workers. In regions where disease pressure is low and fungicide resistance has not been observed, it is possible to better time the application of systemic fungicides by using a biological forecasting system.

Bananas are a principal crop for people with limited access to other resources, and the decrease in production of the fruit can limit their diet. There is also the possibility that the cost of bananas will rise with the substantial loss of bananas, leading to unaffordability. M. fijiensis has been found in all regions of the world that are major producers of bananas and is a constraint for these countries; specifically, Africa, Asia, and South America. Black Sigatoka is a very destructive disease to the foliage of banana trees. The disruption of photosynthesis can reduce fruit yield by up to 50%. Infection with black streak deaf can interrupt ripening, causing fruit to "ripen prematurely and unevenly, and as a result becoming unsuitable for export". A disruption in the maturation of the fruit can lead to a major shift in the economy of the international commerce. 10% of the bananas that are grown are sold to other countries while the other 90% is consumed by the farmers and local communities. Small farmers growing bananas for local markets cannot afford expensive measures to fight the disease. Black Sigatoka of Bananas threatens the fruit's economy and the lives of the people who depend on the fruit for subsistence.

== See also ==
- List of Mycosphaerella species
