= Butte potato =

Variety of potato

Butte
- Genus: Solanum
- Species: Solanum tuberosum
- Cultivar: 'Butte'

Butte is a potato cultivar that was released in 1977.

According to Charlie Nardozzi:

This late-season variety is the classic Idaho baking potato. It's a great russeted (has rough, brown-colored skin) baking variety that features 20 percent more protein and 58 percent more vitamin C than other varieties. It's also tolerant of scab disease and late blight.

The cultivar is resistant to the lesion-causing nematode species Pratylenchus neglectus and Pratylenchus penetrans, but is susceptible to wilt disease caused by the pathogenic fungus Verticillium dahliae.

== Bibliography ==
- Charlie Nardozzi. Vegetable Gardening for Dummies. John Wiley, 2009.
