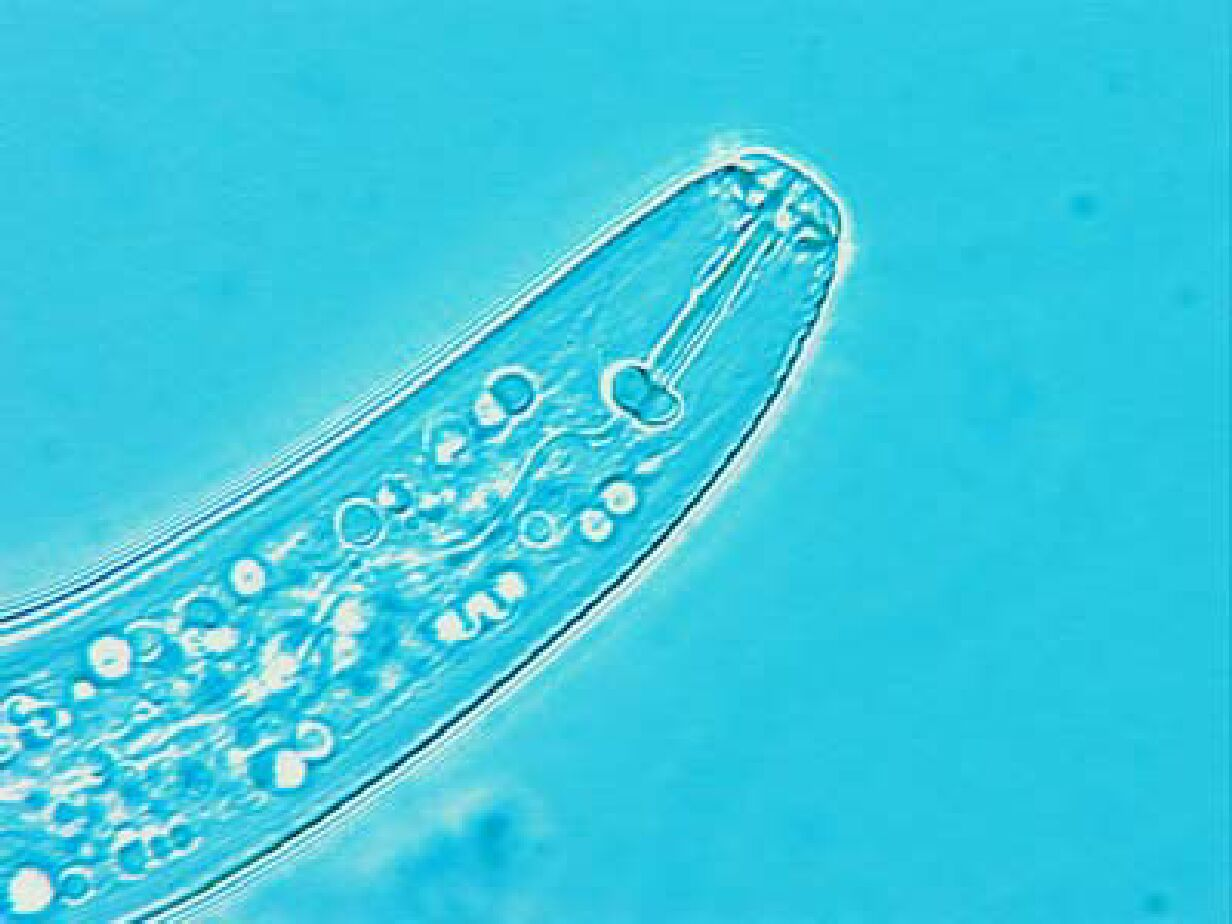

Scientific classification
- Kingdom: Animalia
- Phylum: Nematoda
- Class: Secernentea
- Order: Tylenchida
- Family: Pratylenchidae
- Subfamily: Pratylenchinae; Thorne, 1949

= Pratylenchinae =

Family of roundworms

Pratylenchinae is a subfamily of nematodes or roundworms. It is part of the family Pratylenchidae, which also includes the subfamilies Hirschmanniellinae, Radopholinae, and Nacobbinae. Pratylenchinae are plant parasites.
