= Pratylenchus fallax =

Scientific classification
- Domain: Eukaryota
- Kingdom: Animalia
- Phylum: Nematoda
- Class: Secernentea
- Order: Tylenchida
- Family: Pratylenchidae
- Genus: Pratylenchus
- Species: P. fallax

Binomial name
- Pratylenchus fallax Seinhorst, 1968

Species of roundworm

Pratylenchus fallax is a plant pathogenic nematode.
