= Pratylenchus brachyurus =

Scientific classification
- Kingdom: Animalia
- Phylum: Nematoda
- Class: Secernentea
- Order: Tylenchida
- Family: Pratylenchidae
- Genus: Pratylenchus
- Species: P. brachyurus

Binomial name
- Pratylenchus brachyurus (Godfrey, 1929)

Species of roundworm

Pratylenchus brachyurus is a plant parasitic nematode.

== Introduction ==
Pratylenchus brachyurus, like many other plant-parasitic nematodes, are microscopic worms that can be damaging to many agricultural crops. Across the world, many billions of dollars each year are lost due to the damaging abilities of nematodes on cash crops. P. brachyurus is a migratory endoparasite that enters the roots and moves throughout the root tissue while completing its life cycle.

== History ==
Under the old classification system based on morphology, these nematodes were under the class Adenophorea. This changed in 2004 when a new classification system was presented by De Ley and Blaxter using SSU rDNA for comparison between different species of nematodes. Using this new system, De Ley and Blaxter placed P. brachyurus in the Class Chromadorea, Order Rhabditida. In 1929 Godfrey first described P. brachyurus as the main cause for pineapple-root disease and called them Tylenchus brachyurus. He also discussed several other nematodes which were all later put into the genus Pratylenchus. In 1934, Filipjev proposed the genus Pratylenchus. This proposed new genus name came with some challenges because the International Code of Zoological Nomenclature states that the new genus name must come with a statement as to why you want to change the name. It must also give reasons differentiating the new genus plus give the name of the type species. In 1936 the new genus name was universally accepted.

== Description ==
This nematode is a migratory endoparasite that ranges from about 0.4 to 0.5 millimetres (1/64 to 3/128 in) long and has a lip region that is angular and offset from the body. It is generally low and flat and has two distinct annules. P. brachyurus has a short strong stylet about 20 um long and large round basal knobs. It also has a short ventral overlap of the esophagus. The females have lateral fields marked by four incisures. Males are very rare and have one single outstretched testis.

== Distribution and economic importance ==
Pratylenchus are second only behind Meloidogyne in terms of crops infested and the extent of crop damage and loss. Pratylenchus brachyurus is widely spread throughout the warmer regions of the world. In Brazil it is the most widely distributed root lesion nematode on coffee. They introduce necrosis in the cortex of the root which is detrimental to the plant. Lesion nematodes severely damage a plant and open points of entry for other bacteria and fungus to enter the root. In the US it is mainly found in southern regions and in Florida it is found in nearly every county. A study in 1969 showed that it is found in 90% of the citrus groves in Florida. Due to P. brachyurus being able to infest a wide range of crops and being so damaging, it is of high economic importance.

P. brachyurus causes severe losses in maize (corn) in Western Nigeria and South Africa among other areas.

== Reproduction and life cycle ==
These nematodes have the general nematode life cycle with four juvenile stages keeping their vermiform shape throughout the entire life cycle except the egg stage. Any of the stages, except the egg and J1 which molts inside the egg, can infect the root. The nematodes get inside the roots and move throughout the root laying eggs individually in the root cortex and maybe a few in the soil. This particular species of Pratylenchus reproduces by parthenogenesis. The males of this species have not been found very often.

== Host-parasite relationships ==
P. brachyurus can infest a wide range of crops. Peanuts, pineapple, soybeans, sugar cane, tomatoes, citrus, cotton and yam are just a few of the crops it can infest. With such a wide range of hosts, P. brachyurus is an important nematode for scientist to study and try to develop a resistant variety of its host plants. The problem with P. brachyurus is that not too much is known about it and many of the reports available contradict each other. In 2001 in Nematropica, it was stated that the host range of these nematodes has not been determined meaning that crop rotation as a way to manage these pest could prove to be difficult. In 2012, the Journal of Cotton Science reported that this nematode is found in cotton fairly often but its pathogenicity is still in question. The variety of cotton used in the study seemed to be tolerant of the nematode and it only slightly affected the growth of the plant. Some varieties of cotton are intolerant to these nematodes so a farmer would want to try and plant tolerant varieties. When nematodes infest a root, they can open up the root to many other pathogens including bacteria and fungus. There have been numerous reports of nematodes interacting with Fusarium spp as well as many other fungi. Two scientists by the names of Michell and Powell presented evidence in their study that P. brachyurus can increase the incidence of Fusarium Wilt in cotton.

== Management ==
Many different methods to control nematodes have been tried over the years. Some have proven more successful and others have not. Some of these methods include nematicides, cover crops, crop rotation, genetically modified plants and seed treatments. In soybeans, Essex is a tolerant cultivar whereas Forrest is sensitive. Essex has a higher yield in fields that are infested with the nematode. The plots in this study by Koenning were treated with aldicarb, carbofuran, and fenamiphos and had less nematodes 40 days post planting then the areas that were not treated. The plots that were planted with Forrest which is the sensitive cultivar and treated with carbofuran had a higher yield than untreated control plots. Damage threshold levels have not been well established but using fumigated plots has shown significant increases in yield. In Brazil, many crops are planted under the no tillage planting system. This typically causes of buildup of polyphagous species of nematodes like P. brachyurus. If a no till system is being used, planting cover crops that would decrease the density of the nematodes may be needed. The problem with that is there is contradictory information regarding P. brachyurus and which plants are poor or good hosts. Due to this very same reason, farmers would have to be very careful in choosing a crop rotation schedule as well. In 1992 Vast demonstrated that arbuscular mycorrhizal fungi could enhanced the plant’s resistance to nematodes by being a physical barrier. This would be something that could be used as a seed treatment to protect the newly emerging seedlings from being infested.

As with many other nematodes that cause crop loss, we need to continue to move forward in the study of these nematodes. Many of the managements tools used are very contradictory in studies and no good management strategy has been established. This nematode is so widespread and has such a wide range of hosts that several different management strategies will have to be developed based on the specific crop and area. Hopefully one day we will be able to develop a gene that can be put into plants to defend them against these nematodes as well as many other different types of nematodes.
