= Radopholus arabocoffeae =

Scientific classification
- Domain: Eukaryota
- Kingdom: Animalia
- Phylum: Nematoda
- Class: Secernentea
- Order: Tylenchida
- Family: Pratylenchidae
- Genus: Radopholus
- Species: R. arabocoffeae

Binomial name
- Radopholus arabocoffeae Trinh, Nguyen, Waeyenberge, Subbotin, Karssen & Moens, 2004

Species of nematode

Radopholus arabocoffeae is a nematode in the genus Radopholus. It is notable as an early example, along with Radopholus similis, of the alternative flatworm mitochondrial code.
