= Pratylenchus hexincisus =

Scientific classification
- Domain: Eukaryota
- Kingdom: Animalia
- Phylum: Nematoda
- Class: Secernentea
- Order: Tylenchida
- Family: Pratylenchidae
- Genus: Pratylenchus
- Species: P. hexincisus

Binomial name
- Pratylenchus hexincisus Taylor & Jenkins, 1957

Species of roundworm

Pratylenchus hexincisus is a plant pathogenic nematode infecting sunflowers.
