= Pratylenchus thornei =

Thorne's meadow nematode

Scientific classification
- Domain: Eukaryota
- Kingdom: Animalia
- Phylum: Nematoda
- Class: Secernentea
- Order: Tylenchida
- Family: Pratylenchidae
- Genus: Pratylenchus
- Species: P. thornei

Binomial name
- Pratylenchus thornei Sher & Allen, 1953

Nematode worm, disease of cereals

Thorne's meadow nematode (Thorne's root-lesion nematode; Pratylenchus thornei) is a plant pathogenic nematode.

== Hosts ==
Hosts include Aegilops geniculata (ovate goatgrass) and Triticum aestivum (cultivated wheat).

Aegilops geniculata enjoys moderate resistance to this nematode. Ae. geniculata is thus used as a wild source of resistance for introgression into cultivated wheat.
