= Pratylenchus loosi =

Scientific classification
- Kingdom: Animalia
- Phylum: Nematoda
- Class: Chromadorea
- Order: Rhabditida
- Family: Pratylenchidae
- Genus: Pratylenchus
- Species: P. loosi

Binomial name
- Pratylenchus loosi Loof, 1960

Species of roundworm

Pratylenchus loosi is a plant pathogenic nematode infecting tea and citrus.
