= Tylenchus elegans =

Scientific classification
- Domain: Eukaryota
- Kingdom: Animalia
- Phylum: Nematoda
- Class: Secernentea
- Order: Tylenchida
- Family: Tylenchidae
- Genus: Tylenchus
- Species: T. elegans

Binomial name
- Tylenchus elegans de Man, 1876

Species of roundworm

Tylenchus elegans is a species of marine nematodes in the family Tylenchidae and subfamily Tylenchinae. It is from the Gulf of Naples, Italy.
