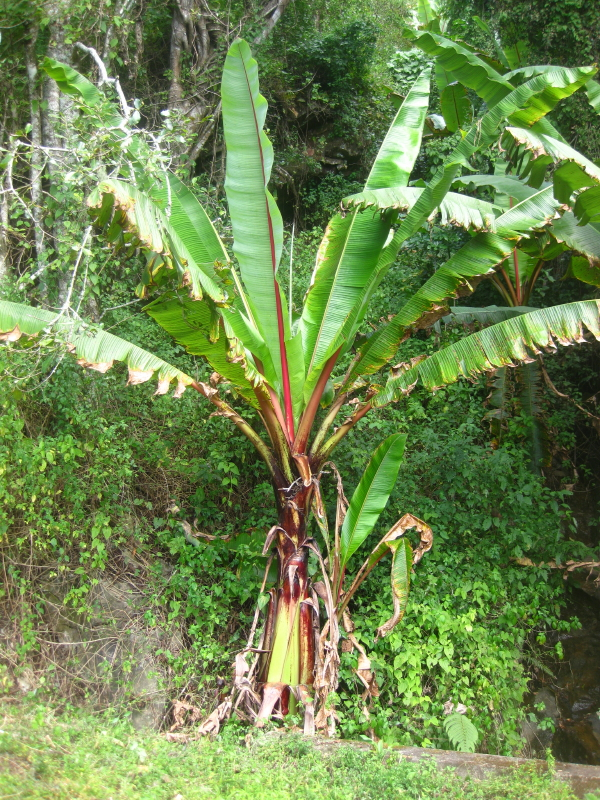
- Ensete ventricosum in Mozambique

Conservation status
- Least Concern (IUCN 3.1)

Scientific classification
- Kingdom: Plantae
- Clade: Tracheophytes
- Clade: Angiosperms
- Clade: Monocots
- Clade: Commelinids
- Order: Zingiberales
- Family: Musaceae
- Genus: Ensete
- Species: E. ventricosum

Binomial name
- Ensete ventricosum (Welw.) Cheesman

Synonyms
- List: Ensete arnoldianum (De Wild.) Cheesman; Ensete bagshawei (Rendle & Greves) Cheesman; Ensete buchananii (Baker) Cheesman; Ensete davyae (Stapf) Cheesman; Ensete edule Bruce ex Horan.; Ensete fecundum (Stapf) Cheesman; Ensete holstii (K.Schum.) Cheesman; Ensete laurentii (De Wild.) Cheesman; Ensete proboscideum (Oliv.) Cheesman; Ensete ruandense (De Wild.) Cheesman; Ensete rubronervatum (De Wild.) Cheesman; Ensete schweinfurthii (K.Schum. & Warb.) Cheesman; Ensete ulugurense (Warb. & Moritz) Cheesman; Ensete ventricosum var. montbeliardii (Bois) Cufod.; Mnasium theophrasti Pritz. [Invalid]; Musa arnoldiana De Wild.; Musa bagshawei Rendle & Greves; Musa buchananii Baker; Musa davyae Stapf; Musa ensete J.F.Gmel.; Musa fecunda Stapf; Musa holstii K.Schum.; Musa kaguna Chiov.; Musa laurentii De Wild.; Musa martretiana A.Chev.; Musa proboscidea Oliv.; Musa ruandensis De Wild.; Musa rubronervata De Wild.; Musa schweinfurthii K.Schum. & Warb.; Musa ulugurensis Warb. & Moritz; Musa ventricosa Welw.

= Ensete ventricosum =

Species of flowering plant in the banana family Musaceae

Ensete ventricosum, commonly known as enset or ensete, Ethiopian banana, Abyssinian banana, pseudo-banana, false banana, and wild banana, is a species of flowering plant in the banana family Musaceae. The only country where the domesticated form of the plant is cultivated is Ethiopia, where it provides the staple food for approximately 20 million people. The name Ensete ventricosum was first published in 1947 in the Kew Bulletin. Its synonyms include Musa arnoldiana, Musa ventricosa, and Musa ensete. In its wild form, it is native to the eastern edge of the Great African Plateau, extending northwards from South Africa through Mozambique, Zimbabwe, Malawi, Kenya, Uganda, and Tanzania to Ethiopia, and west to the Congo, being found in high-rainfall forests on mountains, and along forested ravines and streams.

== Discovery ==
In 1769, the Scottish traveller James Bruce first sent a description of a plant common in the marshes around Gondar in Abyssinia (a historical region which includes Ethiopia), pronouncing it to be "no species of Musa" and wrote that its local name was ensete. In 1853, the British Consul at Mussowah sent some seeds to Kew Gardens, mentioning that their native name was ansett. Kew did not make the connection to bananas until they germinated and grew in size.

Bruce also discussed the plant's place in the mythology of Egypt and pointed out that some Egyptian carvings depict the goddess Isis sitting among the leaves of what was thought to be a banana plant, a plant native to Southeast Asia and not known in Ancient Egypt.

== Description ==
Like the banana, Ensete ventricosum is a large non-woody plant—a large monocarpic evergreen perennial—up to 6 m (20 ft) tall. The tallest to be reported was 13 m (43 ft). It has a stout pseudostem of tightly overlapping leaf bases, and large banana-like leaf blades of up to 5 m (16 ft) tall by 1 m (3 ft 3 in) wide; leaves up to 6 m (20 ft) long and up to 1.5 m (4 ft 11 in) wide have been reported. The flowers, which occur only once from the centre of the plant at the end of that plant's life, are in large pendant thyrses up to 3 m (9.8 ft) long, bearing 30 or more "hands" of young bananas which are covered by large pink bracts. The roots are an important foodstuff, but the fruits are inedible and have hard, black, rounded seeds.

=== Etymology ===
The Latin specific epithet ventricosum means "with a swelling on the side, like a belly".

=== Pests ===
The most common pest that threatens the enset plant is the Cataenococcus enset, which is a root mealybug. C. enset feeds on the roots and corm of plant, which leads to slower growth and easier uprooting. Even though enset can be infested at all ages, the highest risk is between the second and fourth growth years. The dispersion of the mealybug occurs through multiple vectors. First, the larvae can crawl short distances before settling down; adult mealybugs tend to move only after being disturbed. Second, mealybug-ant symbiotic relationships can be linked to enset infestation where the ants protect and transport the mealybug over short distances. In return, the ants feed on the mealybug honeydew. Third, flooding events can transport the mealybug over longer distances and reach enset plants. However, the main transport vectors are unclean working tools and the usage of already infected suckers. This means that the best way to get rid of the bug and to limit its propagation is to uproot the plant and burn it. In addition, the fields can be kept free of plant growth for a month since the mealybug can survive up to only three weeks without plant material.

Other pests include nematodes, spider mites, aphids, mole-rats, porcupines, and wild pigs. The latter erodes the corm and pseudostem. As for the nematodes, there are two predominant species: the root-lesion nematodes (Pratylenchus goodeyi) and the root-knot nematodes (Meloidogyne sp.); and their appearance is in connection with bacterial wilt. Pratylenchus goodeyi creates lesions on the corm and roots; the lesions can result in cavities up to 2 cm (0.79 in) with characteristic purple colouring around the cavities. The nematode infestation leads to the easy uprooting of the affected plants. Crop rotation can counteract nematode infestations.

=== Diseases ===
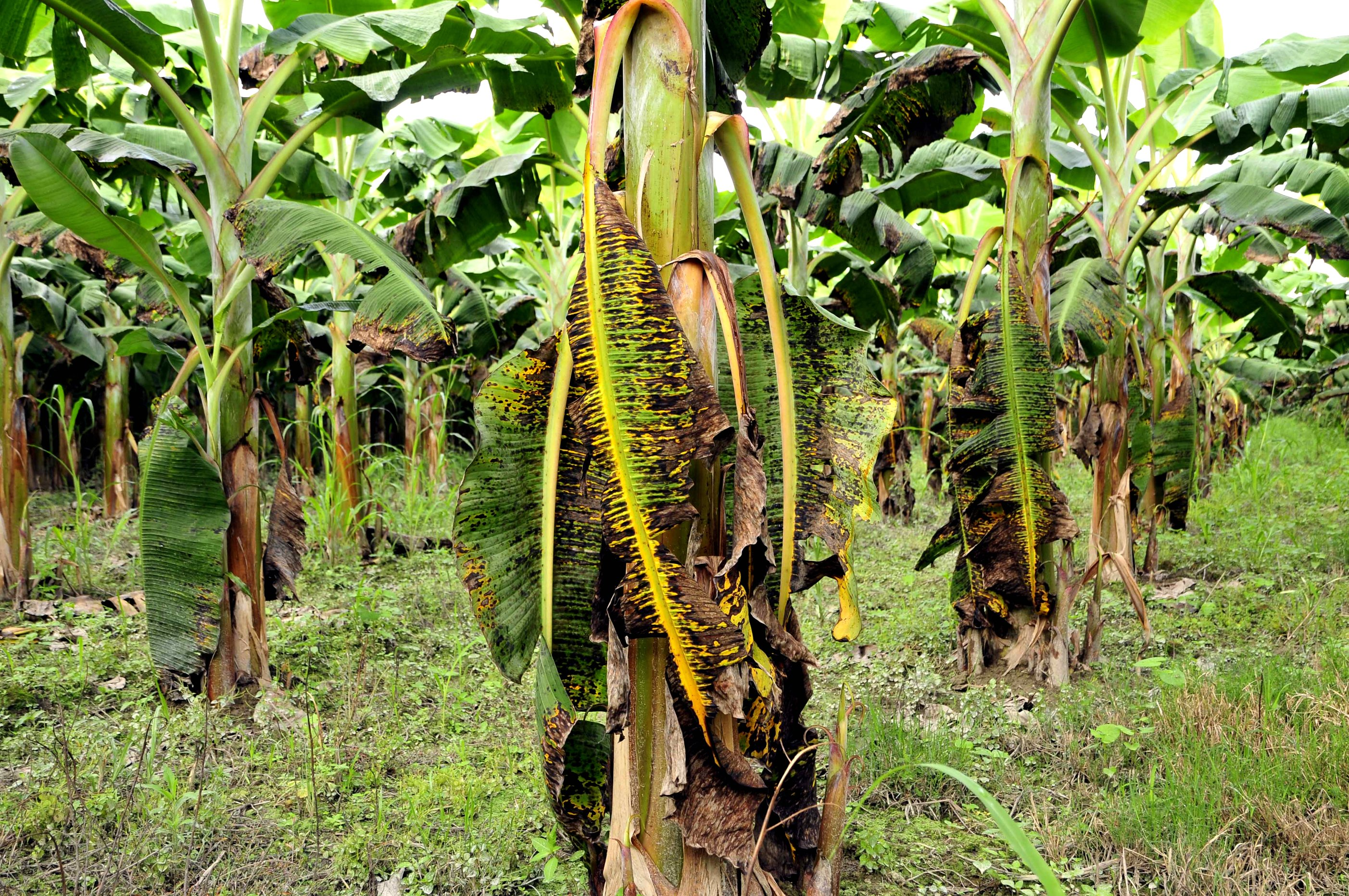
Black sigatoka leaf streak

The enset plant can be subject to multiple diseases that threaten its use in agriculture. The most well known of them is the infection by the bacteria Xanthomonas campestris pathovar Musacerum which creates bacterial wilt, also known as borijje and wol'a by the Koore people. The first observation of this disease was reported by Yirgou and Bradbury in 1968. The manifestation of the bacterial wilt is taking place in the apical leaves that will wilt then dry and finally lead to the drying of the whole plant. The only way to avoid the spreading of the disease is in uprooting, burning, and burying plants as well as in applying strict control of the knives and tools used to harvest and treat the plants.

Other diseases have been observed, such as Okka and Woqa, which occur respectively in cases of severe drought and in situations of too much water in the soil, which causes the proliferation of bacteria. These problems can be solved by either watering the field when drought is present or draining the soil to avoid too much water.

Another disease can strike enset even though it has been more observed on banana plants (Musaceae). This disease is caused by Mycosphaerella spp. and is commonly called black sigatoka leaf streaks. The symptoms are basically dark/brown lesions surrounded by yellow on the leaves. This disease happens to be facilitated by high rainfall and lower temperatures.

== Relation to humans ==
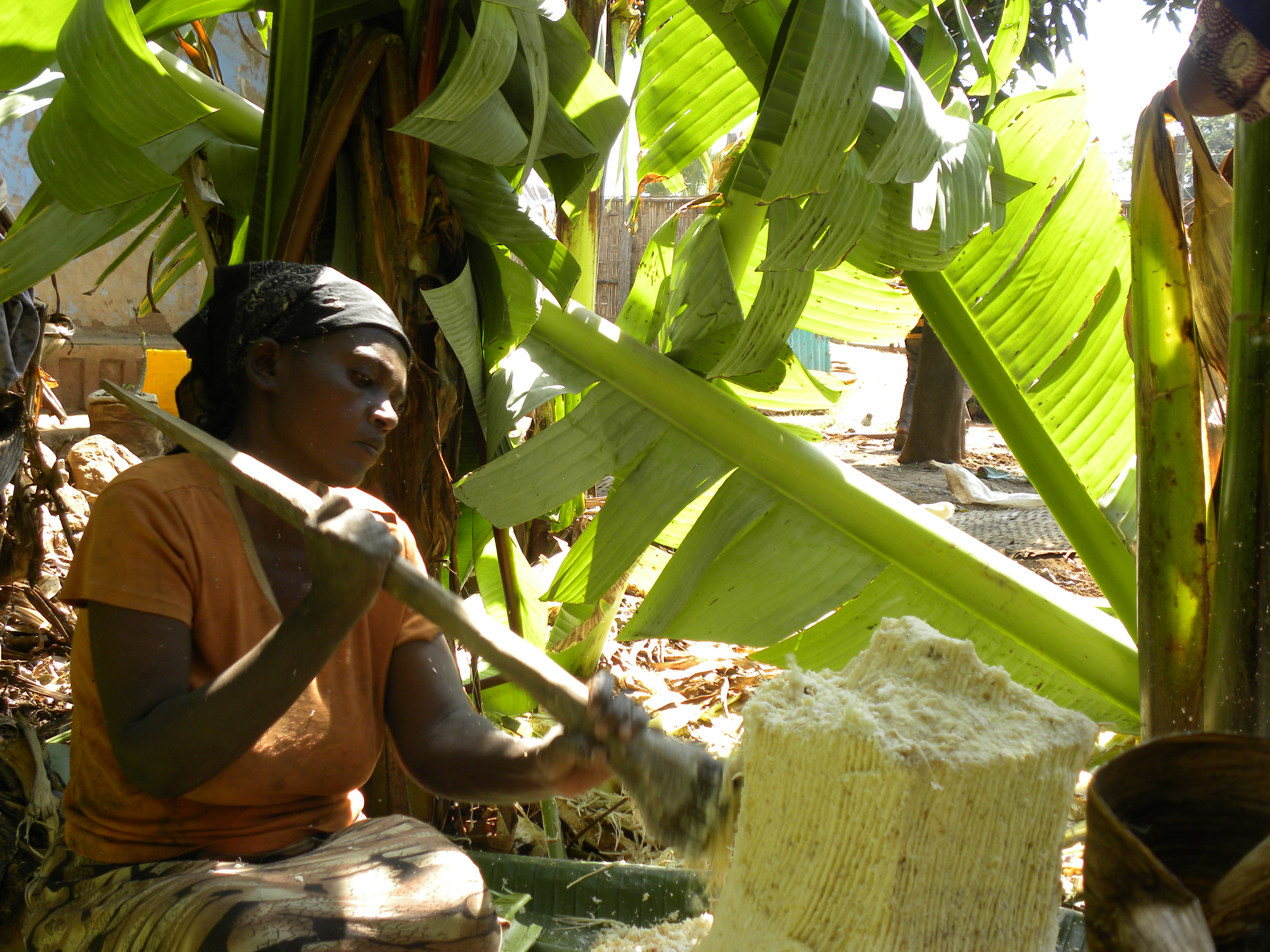
A Kambaata woman extracting the edible part of an enset with a traditional tool (SNNPR, Ethiopia)

=== Food ===
Enset is an important local food source, especially in Ethiopia. In 1995, the Food and Agriculture Organization of the United Nations reported that "enset provides more food per unit area than most cereals. It is estimated that 40 to 60 enset plants occupying 250–375 square metres (2,700–4,000 sq ft) can provide enough food for a family of 5 to 6 people."

Enset is Ethiopia's most important root crop, a traditional staple in the densely populated south and southwestern parts of Ethiopia. Its importance to the diet and economy of the Gurage and Sidama peoples was first recorded by Jerónimo Lobo in the seventeenth century. Each plant takes four to five years to mature, at which time a single root will yield about 40 kg (88 lb) of food. Because of the long period of time from planting to harvest, plantings need to be staggered over time to ensure that there is enset available for harvest in every season. Enset will tolerate drought better than most cereal crops.

Wild enset plants are produced from seeds, while most domesticated plants are propagated from suckers. Up to 400 suckers can be produced from just one mother plant. In 1994, 3,000 km^{2} (1,200 sq mi) of enset were grown in Ethiopia, with a harvest estimated to be almost 10 tonnes per hectare (4.0 long ton/acre; 4.5 short ton/acre). Enset is often intercropped with sorghum, although the practice amongst the Gedeo people is to intercrop it with coffee.

The young and tender tissues in the centre or heart of the plant (the growing point) are cooked and eaten, being nutritious and similar to the core of palms and cycads. In Ethiopia, more than 150,000 hectares (370,000 acres; 580 mi^{2}) are cultivated for the starchy staple food prepared from the pulverised trunk and inflorescence stalk. Fermenting these pulverised parts results in a food called kocho. Bulla is made from the liquid squeezed out of the mixture and sometimes eaten as a porridge, while the remaining solids are suitable for consumption after a settling period of some days. Mixed kocho and bulla can be kneaded into dough, then flattened and baked over a fire. Kocho is in places regarded as a delicacy, suitable for serving at feasts and ceremonies such as weddings, when wheat flour is added. The fresh corm is cooked like potatoes before eating. Dry kocho and bulla are energy-rich and produce from 14 to 20 kJ/g (3.3 to 4.8 kcal/g).

Because of the use of bare feet and hands to cultivate the plant, foodborne disease such as Enterobacteriaceae can become problematic during the enset fermentation process. This has led to more recent efforts by food scientists to develop improved hygienic devices with reduced potential for contamination, such as that which won the USAID funded "Feed the Future EatSafe Innovation Challenge" in 2022.

It is a major crop, although often supplemented with cereal crops. However, its value as a famine food has fallen for several reasons, as detailed in the April 2003 issue of the UN-OCHA Ethiopia unit's Focus on Ethiopia:

Apart from an enset plant disease epidemic in 1984–85, which wiped out large parts of the plantations and created the green famine, in the past 10 years, major factors were recurrent drought and food shortage together with acute land shortage that forced farmers more and more into consumption of immature plants. Hence, farmers were overexploiting their Enset reserves, thereby causing gradual losses and disappearance of the false banana as an important household food security reserve. Even though not all the plant losses can be attributed to drought and land shortage, and hence early consumption of immature crops, estimations go as far as more than 60% of the false banana crop stands have been lost in some areas in SNNPR during the last 10 years. This basically means that a great many people who used to close the food gap with false banana consumption are not able to do so any more, and lacking a viable alternative, have become food insecure and highly vulnerable to climatic and economic disruptions of their agricultural system.

A good quality fibre, suitable for ropes, twine, baskets, and general weaving, is obtained from the leaves. Dried leaf-sheaths are used as packing material, serving the same function as Western foam plastic and polystyrene. The entire plant, except for the roots, is used to feed livestock. Fresh leaves are a common fodder for cattle during the dry season, and many farmers feed their animals with residues of enset harvest or processing.

=== Socio-cultural importance of enset in Ethiopia ===
Enset cultivation in Ethiopia is reported to be 10,000 years old, though there is little empirical evidence to support this. The plant has major economic, social, cultural, and environmental functions related to trade, medicine, cultural identity, rituals, or settlement patterns.

The Enset-planting complex is one of the four farming systems of Ethiopia together with pastoralism, shifting cultivation, and the seed-farming complex. It is widely used by around 20 million people, representing 20-25% of the population that mainly live in the densely populated highlands of south and southwest Ethiopia.

The plant is integral to food security due to its resistance to droughts, during which the growth stops for only a short time; and the fact that it can be harvested at any development stage. However, in recent years, the population growth has put pressure on enset cultivation systems, mainly because of a decrease of fertilization through manure and an increase in demand, especially during droughts. At such times, enset becomes the only resource available.

==== Gender in enset cultivation ====
Gender roles in enset cultivation are of high importance, as a strong division of work exists. Men are generally responsible for the propagation, cultivation, and transplanting of enset, while women are in charge of manuring, hand-weeding, thinning, and landrace selection. Additionally, women process enset plants, which is a tedious work (transformation of the plant into useful material, principally food and fibres) for which they generally come together. Men are disallowed to be on the field during this process. As women are responsible for providing sufficient food to their family, they are the ones who choose when and which plant to harvest and what quantity to sell.

Several studies state the importance of women's knowledge of the different crop varieties. Women are more likely than men to recognize precisely the different varieties of the plant. Nevertheless, women's work is often neglected or considered of lesser importance than men's by researchers and farmers and women are less likely to get access to extension services and quality services than are men.

Another important aspect in which gender plays a role is in the classification of enset varieties. There are differentiated "male" and "female" varieties, according to the preferences of men and women who harvest them. Often, men prefer late maturing genotypes resistant to diseases, while women prefer varieties that are good for cooking and can be harvested for consumption at an earlier stage.

=== Enset biodiversity and socio-cultural and economic groups ===
Over 300 enset varieties have been recorded in Ethiopia, which is important for agro- and biodiversity. The farmers' main interest in maintaining biodiversity is that each variety has different beneficial characteristics. This means that Ethiopian farmers spread important characteristics widely among enset varieties, instead of combining several desired characteristics in one single genotype, the latter being the approach favoured by plant breeders.

More than 11 ethnic groups with different cultures, traditions, and agricultural systems inhabit the enset-growing regions. This contributes to the high number of varieties. Over centuries, the different ethnic groups have applied their specific indigenous knowledge of farming to sustain production in various ways. A dying out of enset varieties would hence also make disappear a part of cultural practices and linguistic terms in Ethiopia.

Enset biodiversity is preserved due to not only the presence of different ethnic groups but also different households' wealth status. Richer farmers can generally afford to maintain a higher level of farm biodiversity because they have more resources, such as land, labour, and livestock. Therefore, they can cultivate more varieties with differing specific characteristics. However, poorer households also try to maintain as many varieties as possible, selecting the disease-resistant types first.

=== Ornamental use ===
This quick-growing plant is often cultivated as an ornamental plant. In frost-prone areas, it requires winter protection under glass. It has gained the Royal Horticultural Society's Award of Garden Merit, as has the cultivar Maurelii (Ethiopian black banana)

== Gallery ==
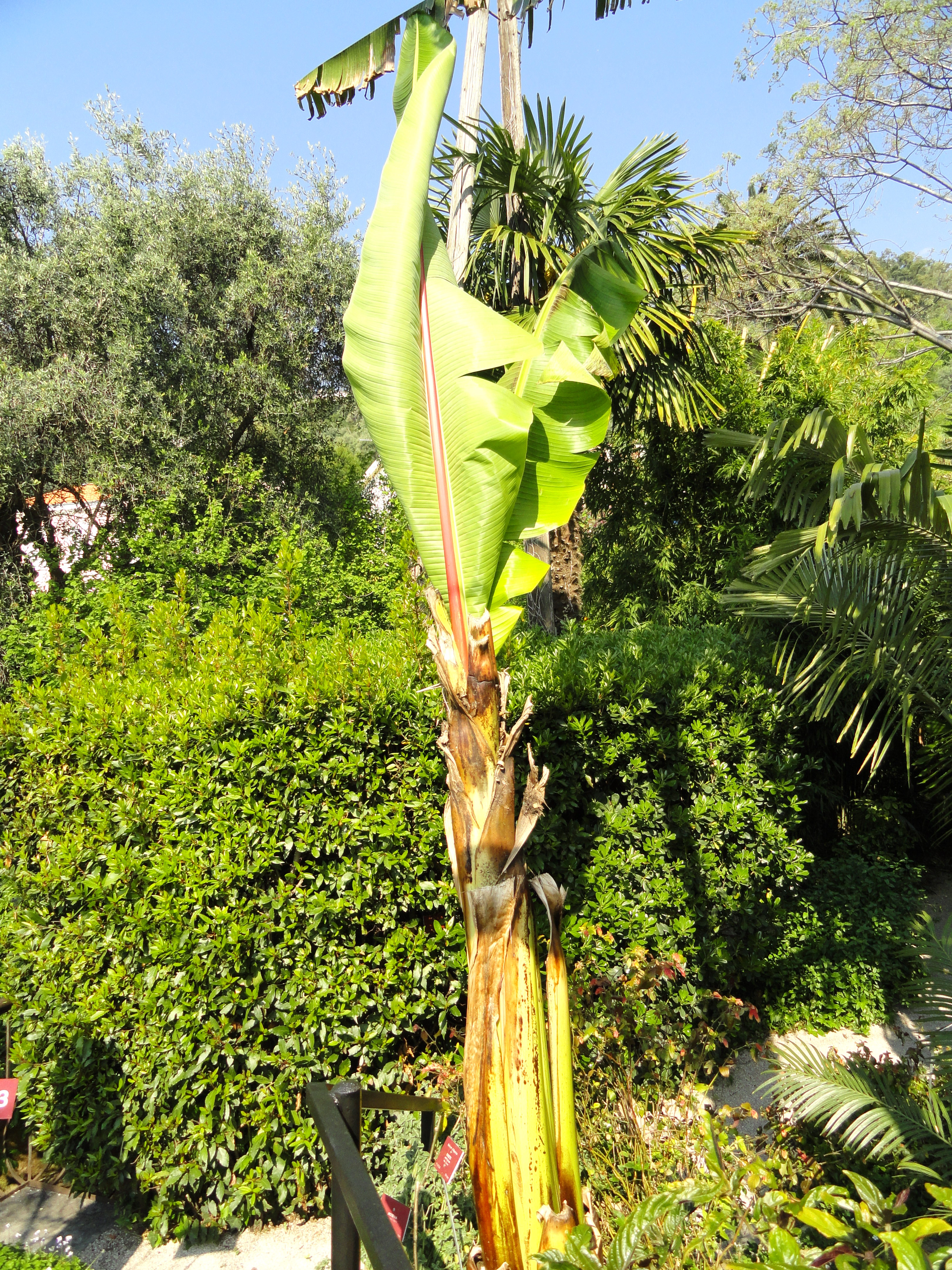
Specimen in Jardin botanique exotique de Menton, Alpes-Maritimes, France

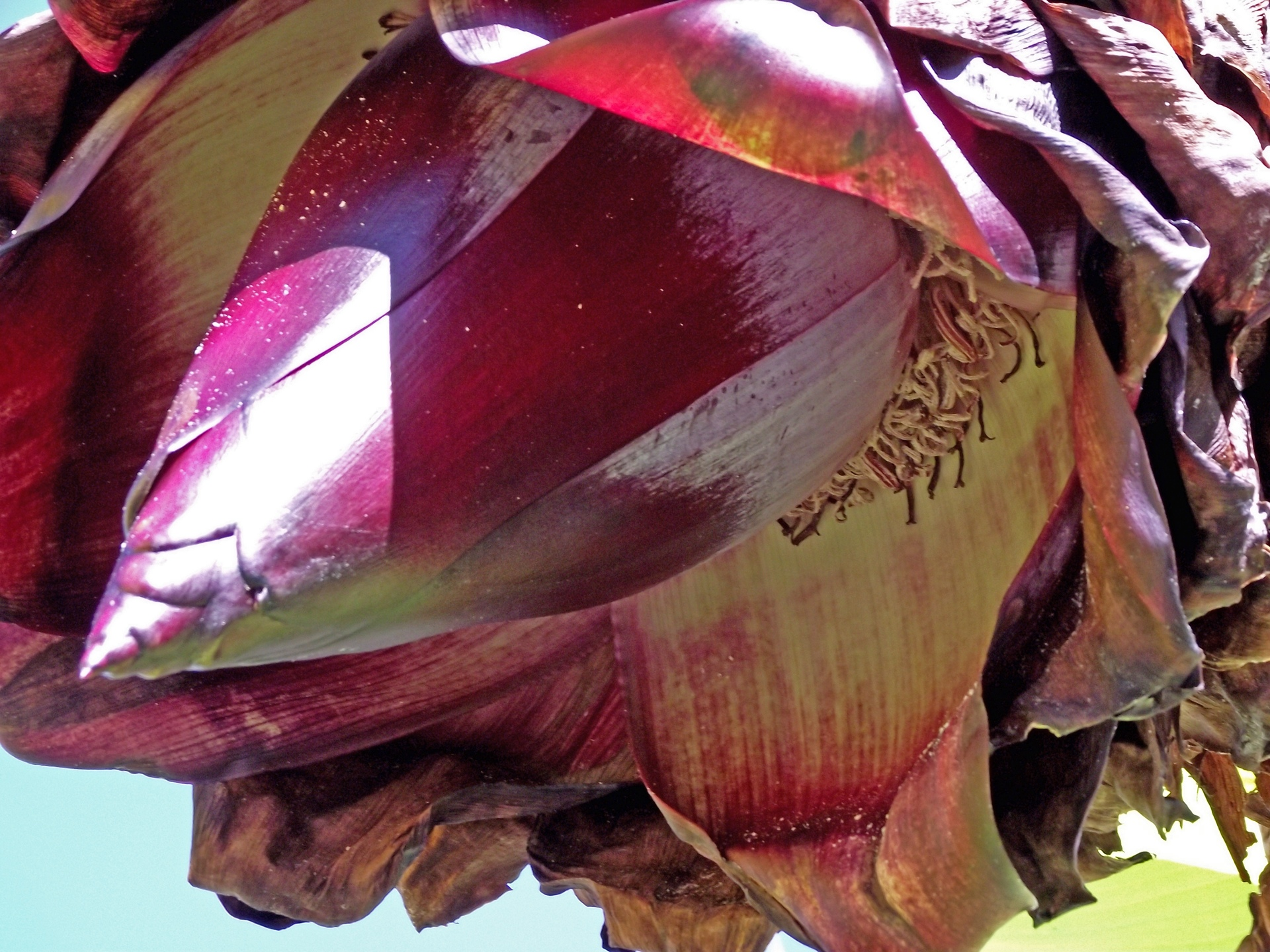
Flower detail

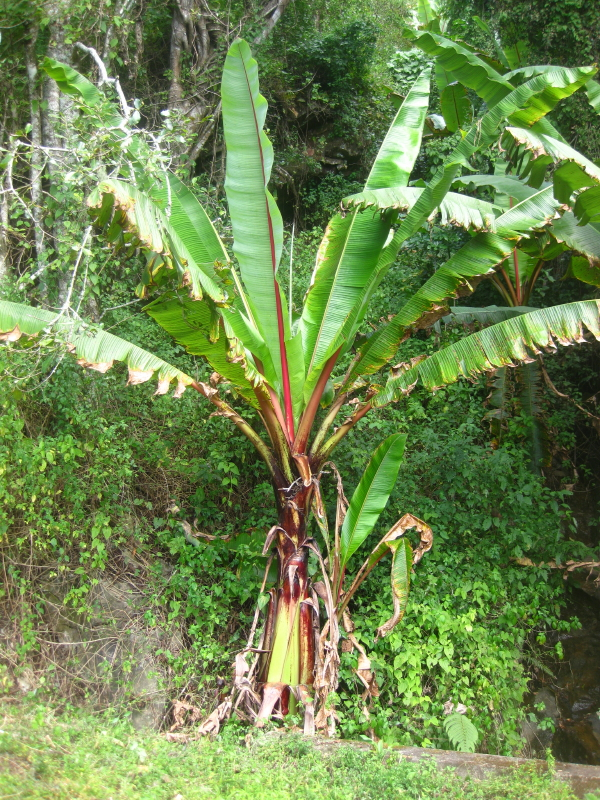
Plant on Mount Tsetserra, Mozambique

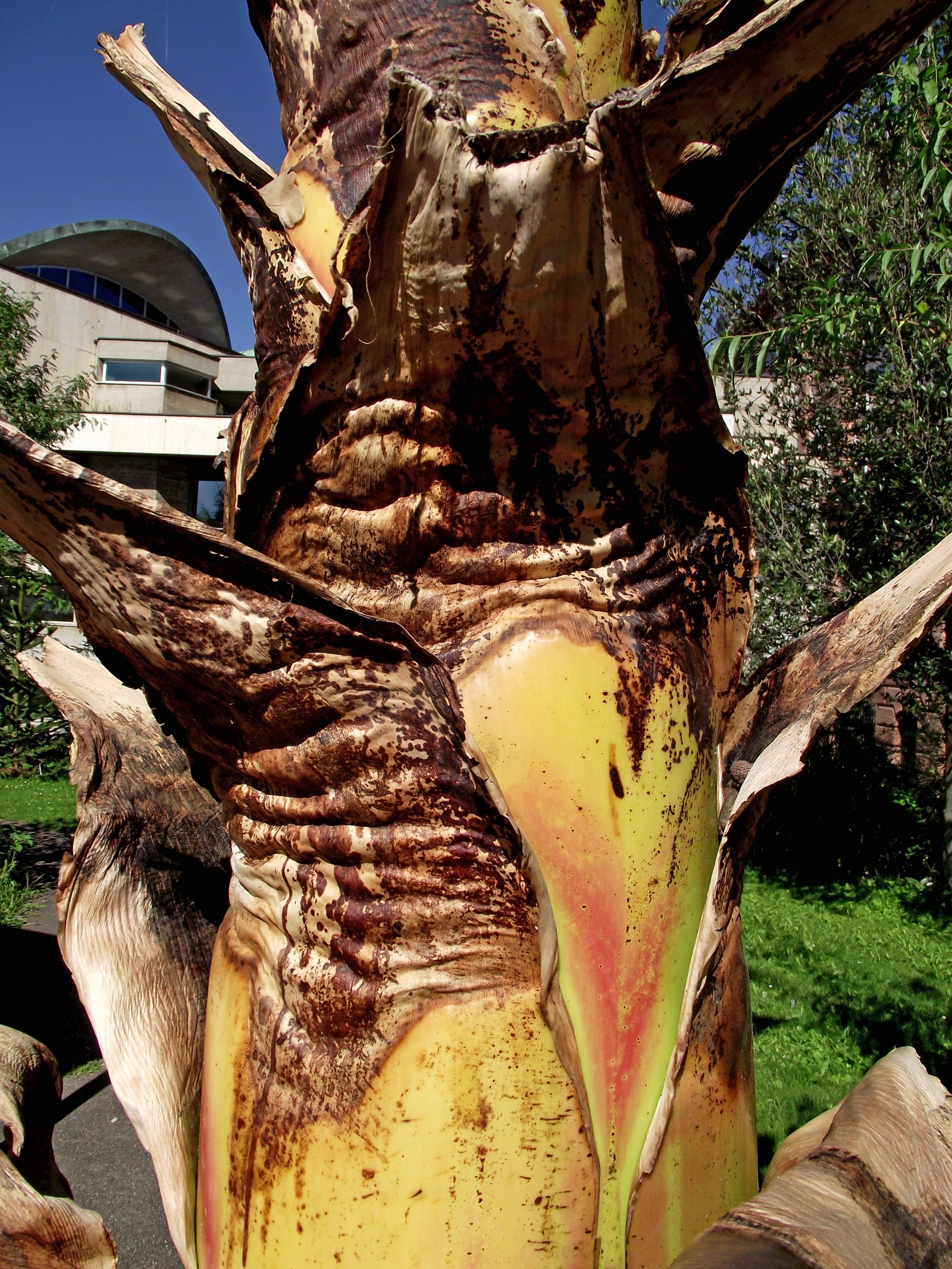
Stem detail

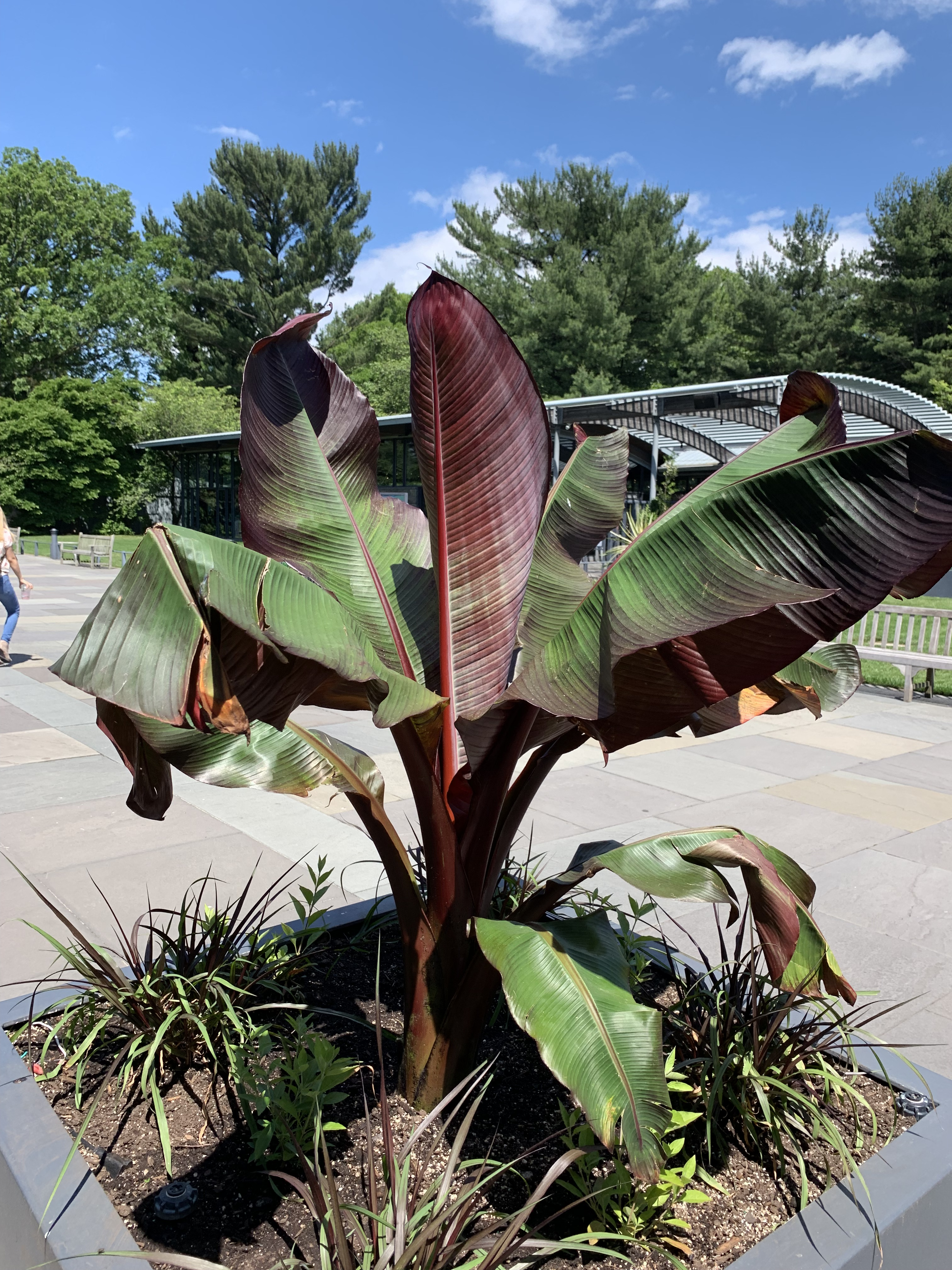
Ensete ventricosum 'Maurelii', a cultivar that is hardy to zones 9-11
