= Pratylenchus alleni =

Scientific classification
- Domain: Eukaryota
- Kingdom: Animalia
- Phylum: Nematoda
- Class: Secernentea
- Order: Tylenchida
- Family: Pratylenchidae
- Genus: Pratylenchus
- Species: P. alleni

Binomial name
- Pratylenchus alleni Ferris, 1961

Species of worm

Pratylenchus alleni is a migratory endoparasitic nematode, living inside of plant roots and feeding on parenchyma cells in the root cortex. P. alleni is an obligate biotroph, meaning it must have a living host in order to survive. Due to their incredibly broad host range, Pratylenchus species fall third in total economic impact, finishing just behind cyst nematodes (Heterodera & Globodera) and root knot nematodes (Meloidogyne). In Canada, it was isolated for the first time in 2011 in a soybean field.

== History ==
Pratylenchus alleni, also referred to as the Root Lesion Nematode, was initially found in the U.S. while infesting nine different varieties of soybeans within a single field in El Dorado, Illinois.

== Distribution ==
Pratylenchus alleni has been found all across the globe in almost every cool, temperate and tropical climates and growing conditions. Although it is more frequently found in Asia, Europe, and North, Central and South America.

== Morphology ==
Male and female Root Lesion Nematodes have the same stylet length of about 14 μm long with well-developed basal knobs. Body length of adult males and females ranges from .33mm - .44mm. Also, they have two annuli, a round spermatheca and this species has both males and females present. Female ovaries have a short single row of oocytes on each end with two rows of oocytes in the middle. Their vulval body diam is slightly shorter than their post-vulval uterine sac with their vulva to anus difference measuring 3 times that of their tail length. Males are very similar to female morphology, with an arrangement of spermatocytes in double or triple rows.

Distinguishing characteristics of P. alleni include a bluntly rounded labial region, lateral fields with four lines, subcylindrical tail with a terminus that is smooth and rounded. Their matrix code is: A1, B2, C2, D2, E3, F2, G2, H1, I3, J1, K1 which is determine using tabular and dichotomous keys based on their morphological characters. Their lateral fields, stylet length, excretory pore and vulva position, post-vulval uterine sac length and number of annuli on tail all serve as distinguishing factors between P. alleni and other closely related species P. flakkensis, P. neobrachyurus.

== Life cycle & reproduction ==
Similar to all nematodes who are parasitic to plants, P. alleni have 6 stages within their life cycle: egg, juvenile 1–4, and adult. Both males and females are required for reproduction to occur. Adult females lay eggs within the root, or in the soil near the root surface. These eggs can be laid singularly or in small groups. The first molt happens within the egg, so at the time of hatching, P. alleni juveniles are in their second juvenile stage (J2). They are able to enter the root and infect throughout all of their life stages, minus the egg and J1 stages, as they are not yet mobile. As a migratory endoparasite, these pests move freely throughout the root to feed and reproduce, destroying host cells and tissue as they move intracellularly. They remain vermiform throughout their life cycle, and can be found within the roots, or within soil after their host dies and can no longer support them. From egg to adult, the cycle is anywhere from 3–8 weeks, depending on temperature, moisture and other environmental conditions.

== Host parasite relationship ==
As an obligate biotroph, P. alleni needs a living host in order to survive. It can feed on and impact several different plants, all with different economic value – some food production crops and others of aesthetic appeal. For example, it has been recorded on Chrysanthemum in India; raspberry in Argentina; vetch and chickpea in Turkey; and soybean, cotton and wheat in Arkansas, USA. It has a very broad host range and can be found on several additional hosts including corn, tobacco, haricot bean, potatoes, legumes, bananas, etc. Some plants are impacted more than others, for instance, the damage threshold of P. alleni on soybeans is 14 nematodes/100cc or 1 cm³ soil.

Their vermiform shape and mobility allow them to enter the root and move freely throughout, feeding on the parenchyma tissue of the root cortex. This feeding causes a reduction of plant growth, less lateral roots, loss of cytoplasm in infected cells, redish brown necrotized lesions, as well as predisposing the damaged roots to fungi and bacteria that can initiate a secondary infection. Using their stylet, Pratylenchus nematodes secrete wall degrading enzymes that help to break down cell walls and allow for more ease of movement. Their movement intracellularly breaks down the tissue, losing turgor pressure, increasing nucleus size and eventually destroying cells along their path of movement. This wounding also allows for other secondary pathogens, such as bacteria and fungi, to invade and cause additional infection.

== Management ==
Many management strategies are used for most Pratylenchus species, not just P. alleni. Chemically based nematicides were traditionally the most commonly used, but over time some have been pulled from the market due to environmental restrictions and concerns, as well as the cost of re-registration of a product. Crop rotation, cover crops, resistant plant varieties, nematicidal plants, soil amendments, fallow periods, soil solarization, thermotherapy, irrigation management and others are all commonly used to suppress reproduction, reduce nematode populations, and minimize their damage. Biological solutions, such as predatory fungi and bacteria have also been studied, and in many cases have been used commercially through seed treatments and other nematicides. Sanitation and chemical nematicides are some of the most widely used, but the best control method is to prevent their initial infestation and plant non-host crops. Complete eradication is not very attainable, and control of populations can be very difficult when most commonly used agricultural practices can assist in movement of the nematode between fields through the movement of infested soil and plants.
