= Pratylenchus scribneri =

Scientific classification
- Domain: Eukaryota
- Kingdom: Animalia
- Phylum: Nematoda
- Class: Secernentea
- Order: Tylenchida
- Family: Pratylenchidae
- Genus: Pratylenchus
- Species: P. scribneri

Binomial name
- Pratylenchus scribneri Steiner in Sherbakoff & Stanley, 1943

Species of roundworm

Pratylenchus scribneri is a plant pathogenic nematode. It is one of the major plant-parasitic nematodes infecting potatoes.
