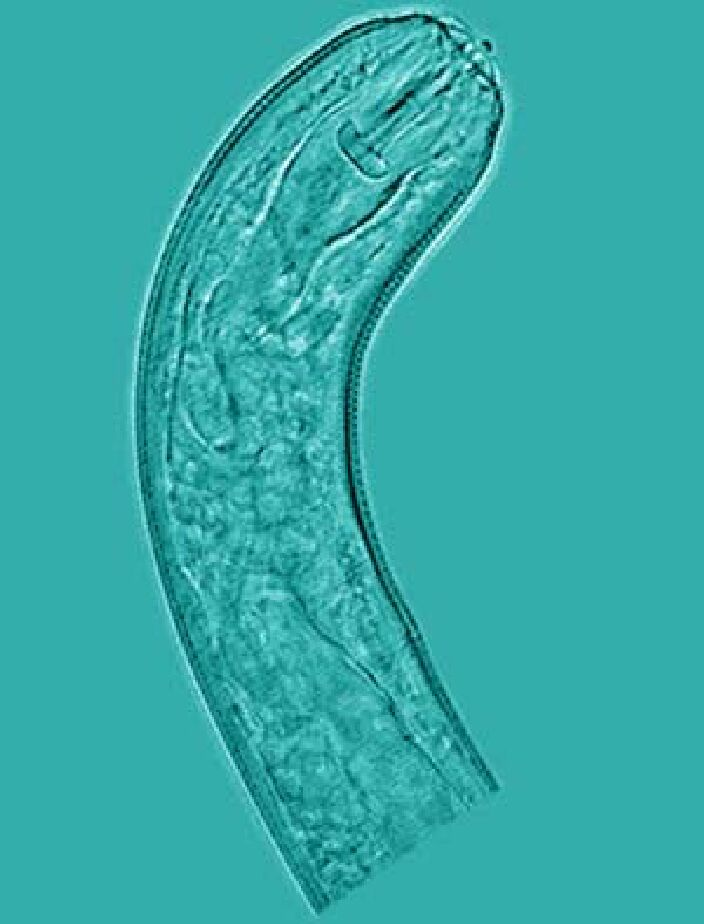

Scientific classification
- Domain: Eukaryota
- Kingdom: Animalia
- Phylum: Nematoda
- Class: Secernentea
- Order: Tylenchida
- Family: Pratylenchidae
- Genus: Pratylenchus
- Species: P. zeae

Binomial name
- Pratylenchus zeae Graham, 1951

= Pratylenchus zeae =

Species of roundworm

Pratylenchus zeae is a plant-pathogenic nematode found on potatoes, maize, cereal, tobacco, coffee, blackberry, and found most often on sugarcane.

== Morphology ==
Female is slender, 0.4–0.55 mm long. Body almost straight when heated. Low and flat lip region. Labial region not offset from the body. Short and strong stylet with well- developed basal knobs. Conical, rounded tail. Esophagus overlaps ventrally. Monovarial, oviduct indistinct, prodelphic and short uterus. Phasmids slightly posterior to mid-tail.

Male is extremely rare, not essential for reproduction. Similar to female except for sexual dimorphism. Spicules slender.

== Economic importance ==
Nematode becomes a concern to farmers when the number feeding on the roots exceeds a certain threshold, above which the plant is unable to grow normally. This threshold varies according to the species of nematode. For Pratylenchus zeae, because the level exceeds in many fields in Australia so that P. zeae is considered the primary nematode. Where the number of nematode individual exceeds 100 per 200 gram pre planting soil or above 200 per 250 gram soil or 1 gram dry roots at mid- season, there are a significant reduction of sugarcane yield. The economic damage from lesion nematodes is often underestimated because above-ground symptoms are not always obvious. No recent data are available regarding damage caused by these pathogens to this crop, but it is known that controlling them raises yields by between 8% and 40%, depending on the species of nematode and hybrid planted.

== Management ==
Nematode assays need to be done before stepping on any managements later. Threshold for plant and first ratoons (per gram of roots) is 300 while threshold for old ratoons (per gram of roots) is over 900. Crop rotation with legume plants on sugarcane fields can reduce the number of plant parasitic nematodes. However, this management has a temporary effect because a high concentration of these nematodes will be resurged within a year of growing fields.

Rotations on wetland rice in Florida is one of the options. Many of the nematodes that feed on sugarcane are able to feed on rice under dry conditions. However, because rice is normally grown in standing water, most of the nematodes are killed by the flooded conditions. Using oil cake from neem (Azadirachta indica), karanj (Pongamia pinnata), Indian mustard (Brassica juncea), polanga (Calophyllum inophyllum), groundnuts (Arachis hypogaea), mahua (Madhuca longifolia) and cotton (Gossypium sp.) could suppress population of P. zeae. Sugarcane grown in soil amended 6 months previously with sawdust, sugarcane trash, grass hay or lucerne hay had 78%, 61%, 96% and 92%, respectively, fewer lesion nematodes in roots than sugarcane growing in non-amended soil. Amendments with high C/N ratios are most effective.

P. zeae populations can be controlled through by weed-free fallow. A few nematicides are labeled for use on sugarcane. Mocap (ethoprop) and telone products are common nematicides used in Florida to control wireworms and also labeled to control plant parasitic nematodes.
