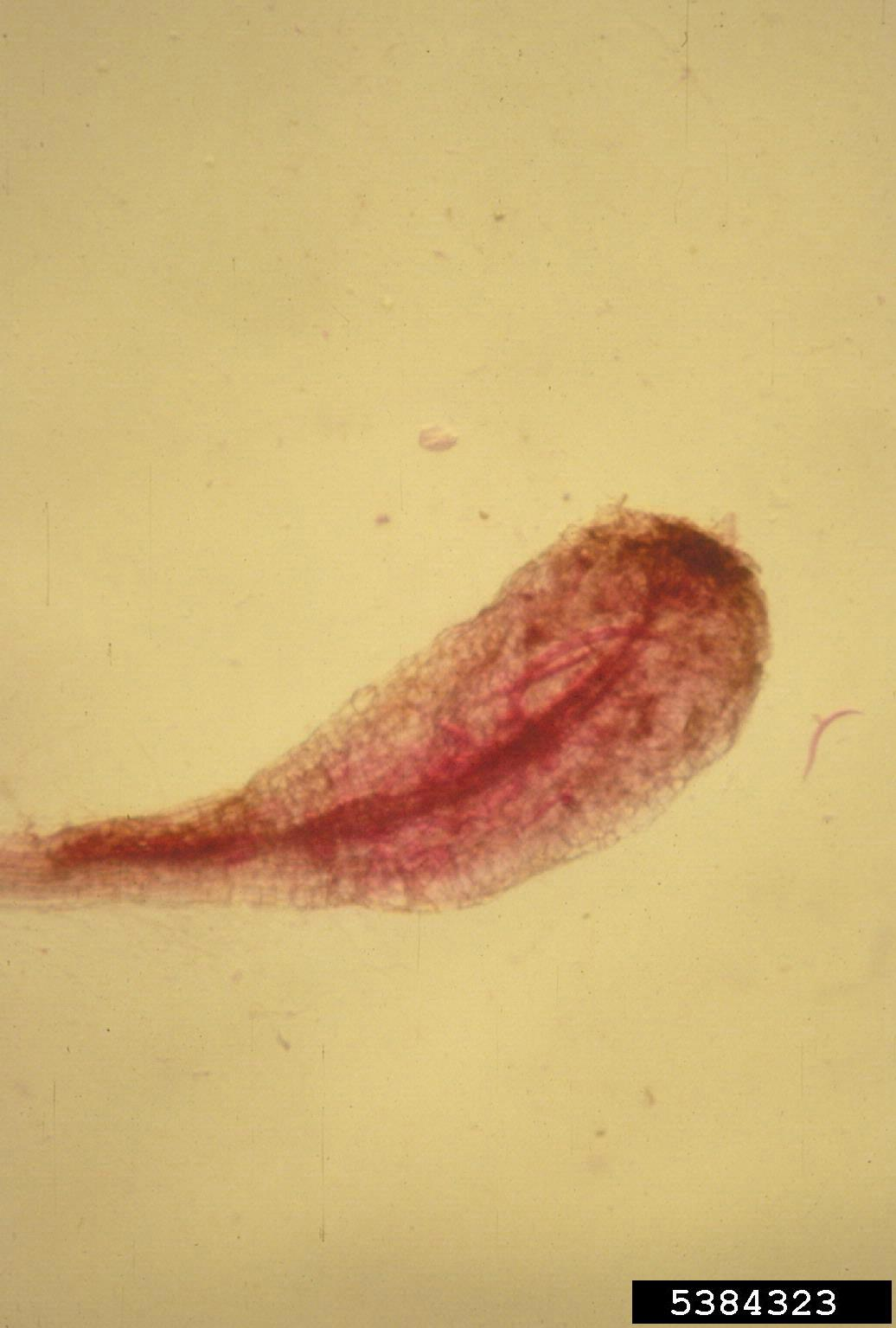

Scientific classification
- Kingdom: Animalia
- Phylum: Nematoda
- Class: Secernentea
- Order: Tylenchida
- Family: Pratylenchidae
- Genus: Nacobbus
- Species: N. aberrans

Binomial name
- Nacobbus aberrans (Thorne, 1935)

Synonyms
- Anguillulina aberrans Pratylenchus aberrans Nacobbus batatiformis Nacobbus serendipiticus Nacobbus serendipiticus bolivianus

= Nacobbus aberrans =

Species of roundworm

Nacobbus aberrans is a plant pathogenic nematode.
