= Pratylenchus crenatus =

Scientific classification
- Domain: Eukaryota
- Kingdom: Animalia
- Phylum: Nematoda
- Class: Secernentea
- Order: Tylenchida
- Family: Pratylenchidae
- Genus: Pratylenchus
- Species: P. crenatus

Binomial name
- Pratylenchus crenatus Loof, 1960

Species of roundworm

Pratylenchus crenatus is a plant pathogenic nematode infecting potatoes.
