= Nacobbus dorsalis =

Scientific classification
- Kingdom: Animalia
- Phylum: Nematoda
- Class: Secernentea
- Order: Tylenchida
- Family: Pratylenchidae
- Genus: Nacobbus
- Species: N. dorsalis

Binomial name
- Nacobbus dorsalis Thorne & Allen, 1944

Species of roundworm

Nacobbus dorsalis, the false root-knot nematode,) is a plant pathogenic nematode.
