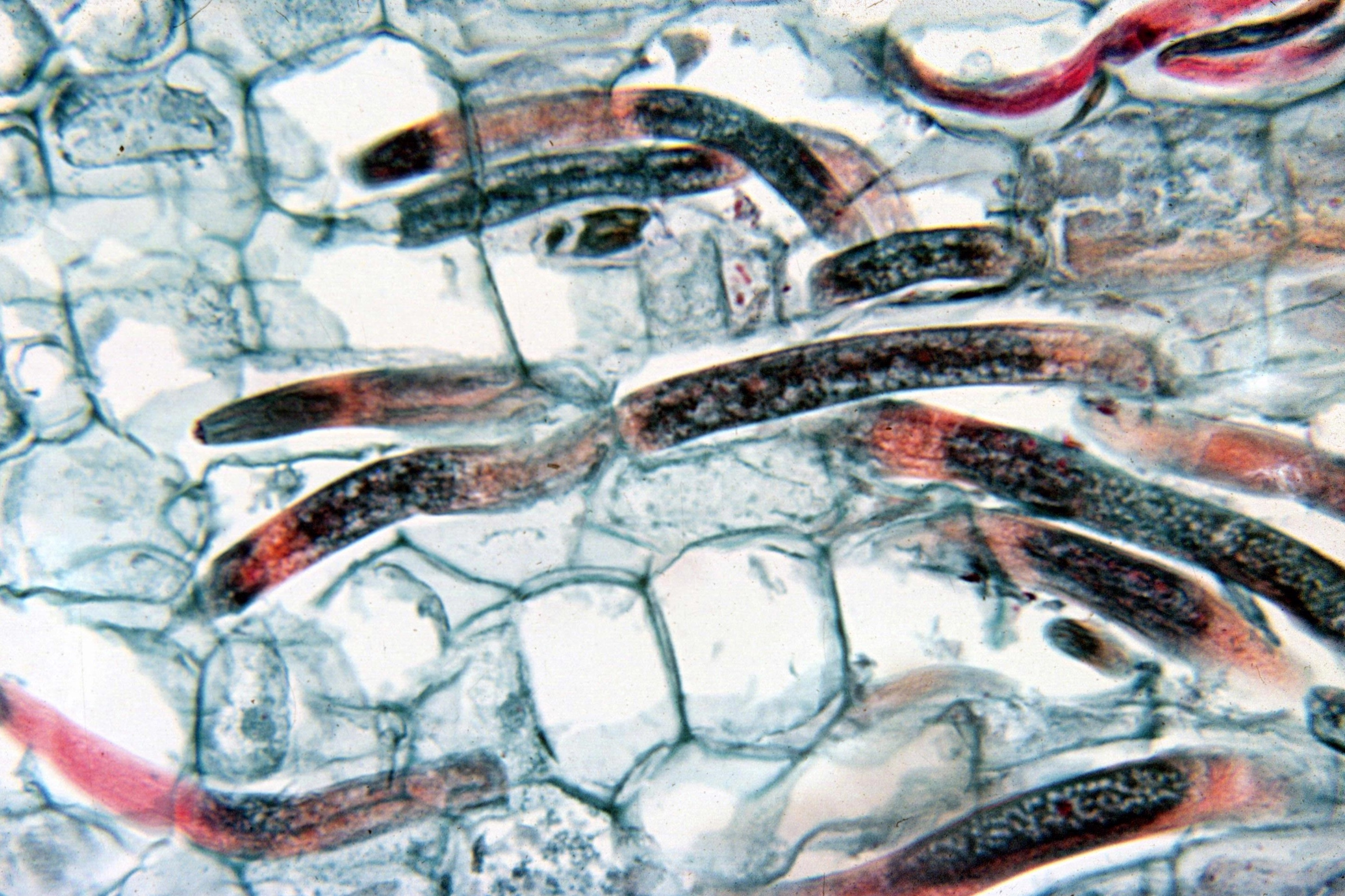

Scientific classification
- Domain: Eukaryota
- Kingdom: Animalia
- Phylum: Nematoda
- Class: Secernentea
- Order: Tylenchida
- Family: Pratylenchidae
- Genus: Radopholus
- Species: R. similis

Binomial name
- Radopholus similis (Cobb, 1893) Thorne, 1949

= Radopholus similis =

Species of roundworm

Radopholus similis is a species of nematode known commonly as the burrowing nematode. It is a parasite of plants, and it is a pest of many agricultural crops. It is an especially important pest of bananas, and it can be found on coconut, avocado, coffee, sugarcane, other grasses, and ornamentals. It is a migratory endoparasite of roots, causing lesions that form cankers. Infected plants experience malnutrition.

== History and distribution ==
The nematode was first described from necrotic tissue in a species of Musa, the banana genus, in 1891. It is one of the most important root pathogens of banana crops, causing yield losses of up to 30 to 60% in many countries. It is known in temperate regions worldwide.

Radopholus similis is found in tropical environments and is therefore common in Africa, Asia, Australia, South and Central America, and southern areas of North America. These parasites are a great example of a disease greatly impacted by globalization. Large infection rates are fairly recent, as global trade and commercialization of crops gained popularity. R. similis prefers warmer environments, hence the tropical habitats. R. similis is an obligate parasite, and therefore must have hosts to survive. Due to the inability to live without a host, they are found in environments where susceptible hosts flourish.

== Hosts and symptoms ==
Radopholus similis parasites can be found in tropical climates, and therefore infect a lot of plants native to tropical areas. Common hosts that are economically important include: banana, coconut, coffee, ginger, sugarcane, ornamentals, and tea. Although R. similis has not been found to infect citrus plants, it is closely related to another variety of burrowing nematodes, Radopholus citrophilus, that is a prominent pathogen to citrus plants. As with a plethora of root diseases, the main symptoms of an infection from burrowing nematodes are stunted growth, rotting roots, and necrotic roots. They are migratory endoparasites, and therefore can cause many localized necrotic patches throughout an infected root system. R. similis signs are generally only seen in the roots, but secondary symptoms such as wilting, weakened structure, and stunting can be caused by the root damage these parasites inflict. In fact, infection via these parasites is referred to as “banana toppling disease” in bananas because the plants often topple due to severe root damage by these nematodes. Prominent symptoms can also vary by host. Black pepper plants often undergo yellowing due to lack of nutrient uptake, ginger plants often become stunted and develop lesions, and tea plants also exhibit stunting and leaf loss.

== Morphology ==
Adults and juveniles are vermiform in shape. Adults are sexually dimorphic. The male has a poorly developed stylet, a knob-like head, and a sharp, curved spicule enclosed in a sac. The male is 500 to 600 μm in length, while the female is about 550 to 880 μm long. The female has a well-developed stylet. Both male and female have long, tapered tails with rounded or indented ends.

== Biology and disease cycle ==
R. similis is a burrowing nematode, meaning it burrows in its host plants roots. These parasites are endoparasites, which refers to the method of obtaining nutrients. They sit inside the plant and siphon nutrients from the cytoplasm of the surrounding cells, instead of living outside the plant and stealing nutrients through other methods. They are also migratory endoparasites, meaning it enters the roots and is able to move throughout the host. Only females infect roots, as they complete egg laying inside the host. They are able to produce both sexually and asexually; and therefore, can be present in female, hermaphrodite, and male forms. Individuals in all stages of the life cycle have stylets and can therefore infect roots and migrate throughout the host, as well as infect new hosts when the current host is spent. They often inhabit the parenchyma and females lay eggs (about 3-5 per day) in the inhabited tissues. Once laid, eggs usually take about 5–10 days to hatch, 10–13 days to develop into adults, and about 2 days to become gravid. All of this equates to a 20-25 day life cycle from egg to gravid adult.

The nematode completes its life cycle in about 21 days at 25 °C. Females and juveniles feed inside roots, especially near the tips. Males with their weak stylets do not feed. Females lay two to six eggs per day.

The nematode causes a disease condition called toppling or blackhead disease in plants. In bananas they weaken the anchor roots and the plants can fall. The roots also fail to supply the plant with water and nutrients, causing reduced growth and development.

== Management ==
The nematode load in the soil can be reduced with fumigation and crop rotation. Cover crops that are not susceptible to the nematode, such as Crotalaria or Tagetes, can be sown. Disease-free sprouts raised from clean tissue cultures can be used.

There are a few notable management strategies used to control R. similis today. There are some nematicides available, although the use of these to control infections continuously declines. Instead, the preferred method of control of R. similis is prevention and control of exporting infected crops. Common ways of controlling nematode include planting resistant or less susceptible hosts, seasonal rotation of crops, biological controls, planting nematode-free individuals, environmental controls, and fallowing. There is continuing research being performed regarding resistant varieties, especially exploring hybrid genotypes and new cultivars with decreased susceptibility. Resistant hosts cause the nematodes to be unable to survive and reproduce, decreasing the population. There is also continued research regarding fungus (biological) controls for nematodes like R. similis. There is evidence that mutualistic relationships with mycorrhizal fungi may reduce the susceptibility of plant hosts. However, there are some conflicting results regarding this technique of nematode control, so it is not currently widely used. Seasonally rotating crop varieties wipe out the nematode populations in the “off” seasons if the crop planted is not a viable host for the parasites. Fallowing is used in a similar instance, but instead of rotating plant varieties, fields are simply only used every other year. Since R. similis is an obligate parasite, they cannot survive without an available host. Planting individuals grown in vitro and guaranteed nematode free prevents any presence of nematodes being inoculated into a crop field. Applying environmental controls such as hot water or increased sun exposure to saplings before planting to desiccate any nematodes present.

Cultivation practices such as monoculture are increasing the susceptibility of host plants. The biggest historically important example of monoculture increasing infection is in bananas. The Gros Michel variety of bananas were wiped out by a fungus (commonly known as Panama Disease) and replaced by the Cavendish variety that is resistant to Panama Disease. The Gros Michel variety was commercialized via monoculture, which caused it to be extremely susceptible to the Panama Disease. However, this new Cavendish variety is also being monocultured, which is increasing its susceptibility to pathogens, such as R. similis.

== Genetics ==
It is notable as an early exemplar, along with Radopholus arabocoffeae, of the alternative flatworm mitochondrial code.
