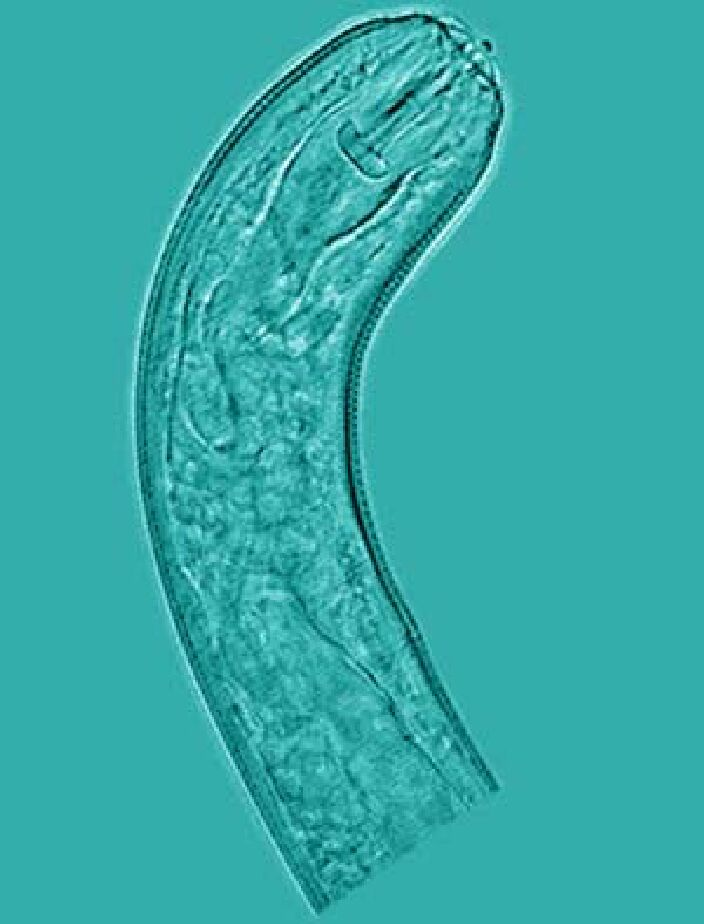
- Pratylenchus zeae

Scientific classification
- Domain: Eukaryota
- Kingdom: Animalia
- Phylum: Nematoda
- Class: Secernentea
- Order: Tylenchida
- Family: Pratylenchidae
- Subfamily: Pratylenchinae
- Genus: Pratylenchus; Filipjev, 1936

Species
- Species include: Pratylenchus alleni; Pratylenchus brachyurus; Pratylenchus coffeae; Pratylenchus crenatus; Pratylenchus fallax; Pratylenchus flakkensis; Pratylenchus goodeyi; Pratylenchus hexincisus; Pratylenchus loosi; Pratylenchus mulchandi; Pratylenchus neglectus; Pratylenchus penetrans; Pratylenchus pratensis; Pratylenchus reniformia; Pratylenchus scribneri; Pratylenchus thornei; Pratylenchus vulnus; Pratylenchus zeae

= Pratylenchus =

Genus of roundworms

Pratylenchus is a genus of nematodes known commonly as lesion nematodes. They are parasitic on plants and are responsible for root lesion disease on many taxa of host plants in temperate regions around the world. Lesion nematodes are migratory endoparasites that feed and reproduce in the root and move around, unlike the cyst or root-knot nematodes, which may stay in one place. They usually only feed on the cortex of the root. Species are distinguished primarily by the morphology of the stylets.

== Hosts and symptoms ==
Root lesion nematodes infect a great variety of hosts. Pratylenchus penetrans alone has over 350 host plants. They include agricultural crops such as soybeans, potatoes, corn, bananas, and wheat. The genus is found most often in corn. Signs of disease are similar in most plants and generally include necrotic lesions of the roots. The lesions can also be entrances for pathogenic bacteria and fungi, which produce secondary infections. Above ground the plant becomes stunted, chlorotic, and wilted, and it often dies. A crop field may be patchy as plants wither and die. Root lesion nematodes can cause significant yield losses.

== Environment ==
Pratylenchus abundance is affected by soil moisture, mineral components, temperature, aeration, organic matter, and pH. They are more common in sandy soils and land with weed infestations. Pratylenchus can endure a wide range of environmental conditions. Moist temperate soils are ideal conditions for breeding and migrating underground, but they can persist in warm and dryer environments. In very dry conditions they are quiescent until moisture increases and plants resume growth. Most lesion nematodes remain inactive when soil temperatures are below 59 °F (15 °C) and are not fully active until temperatures rise above 68 °F (20 °C).

== Management ==
One common management option for crop-pest lesion nematodes is soil fumigation and nematicides. This is not effective for all species, and can be expensive for growers. Water immersion is another option. Infected plants are immersed in a hot water bath for about 30 minutes, which rids them of nematodes but does not harm the plant. This method has been successful for P. coffeae.

Crop rotation can help control the nematode load in the soil because different plants are susceptible to different Pratylenchus species. Selecting resistant plant varieties and cultivars can reduce nematode problems. This is currently the only option for control of P. vulnus, for example.

== Life cycle and pathology ==
Female nematodes lay single eggs in the root or in the soil. They reproduce via parthenogenesis, laying fertile eggs without fertilization. In many species, males are rare.
