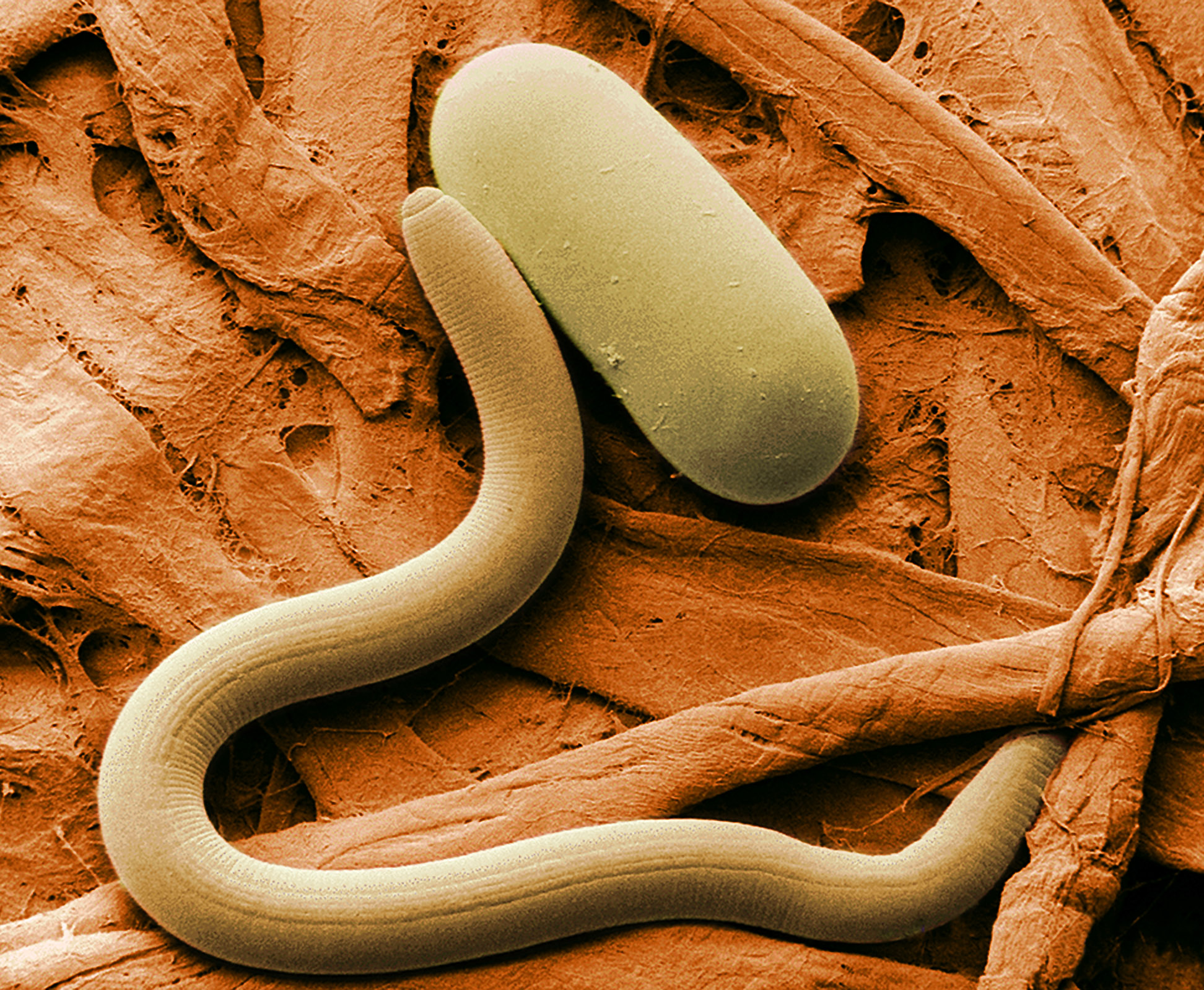
- Heterodera glycines, worm and egg

Scientific classification
- Domain: Eukaryota
- Kingdom: Animalia
- Phylum: Nematoda
- Class: Secernentea
- Order: Tylenchida
- Superfamily: Tylenchoidea (Orley, 1880)

Families
- Anguinidae; Belonolaimidae; Dolichodoridae; Ecphyadophoridae; Hoplolaimidae; Heteroderidae; Pratylenchidae; Tylenchidae

= Tylenchoidea =

Superfamily of roundworms

Tylenchoidea is a superfamily of roundworms. Its members are either plant parasites or detritivores.
