= P. pratensis =

P. pratensis may refer to:

- Poa pratensis, a perennial grass species
- Pratylenchus pratensis, a plant pathogenic nematode species
- Pulsatilla pratensis, a herbaceous perennial plant species
- Pupilla pratensis, a land snail species
