= Achlysiella williamsi =

Scientific classification
- Domain: Eukaryota
- Kingdom: Animalia
- Phylum: Nematoda
- Class: Secernentea
- Order: Tylenchida
- Family: Pratylenchidae
- Genus: Achlysiella
- Species: A. williamsi

Binomial name
- Achlysiella williamsi (Siddiqi, 1961) Hunt, Bridge & Machon, 1989

Synonyms
- Radopholus williamsi Siddiqi, 1961; Radopholus similis apud. Williams, 1959

Species of nematode worm

Achlysiella williamsi is a plant pathogenic nematode in the genus Saccharum which parasitizes sugarcane (Saccharum officinarum). It was found in Papua New Guinea.
