= Chilenchus =

Scientific classification
- Kingdom: Animalia
- Phylum: Nematoda
- Class: Chromadorea
- Order: Rhabditida
- Family: Tylenchidae
- Genus: Chilenchus; M.R. Siddiqi, 2000

Species
- Chilenchus elegans

Genus of roundworms

Chilenchus is a genus of nematodes in the family Tylenchidae. The name comes from Chile, the country from where it originates.

The genus contains one species, Chilenchus elegans (Raski & Geraert, 1986) (syn. Lelenchus elegans Raski & Geraert, 1986). the type species was collected from moist soil under thick tundra at Orange Bay, Hardy Peninsula, Hoste Island, Chile.
