= Green famine =

Famine not caused by drought

Green famine is the term used for a condition in which a country or area is suffering famine even though the fields are green in the absence of drought—it was described as "suffering amongst the plenty". The famine is caused by such problems as "high food prices, coupled with high birth rates and poor land management", flooding, and sometimes man-made ecological problems such as water shortages and deforestation. It is sometimes caused by a poor harvest in the prior year that causes a depletion of food stores during the winter months, thus a lack of food in the spring and summer even when the coming harvest looks "green" and potentially bountiful.

The phenomenon was noted in Sidamo Province, Ethiopia, as early as the 1980s, when bacterial disease and poor rains caused the destruction of much of the ensete crop after farmers had to sell their crops rather than eat them in order to pay heavy taxes; in the 1990s, when after a dry spell the sorghum was growing but carried no seed; and again in the 2000s, when "recent rains [in 2003] created a lush landscape which masks severe hunger".

In the 1990s North Korea suffered from a period of famine caused by poor weather and inefficient transport. This period became known as the "Arduous March"; political changes in countries which formerly supported the North Korean economy reduced or eliminated sources of external support.
