= Pratylenchus goodeyi =

Scientific classification
- Kingdom: Animalia
- Phylum: Nematoda
- Class: Secernentea
- Order: Tylenchida
- Family: Pratylenchidae
- Genus: Pratylenchus
- Species: P. goodeyi

Binomial name
- Pratylenchus goodeyi Sher &Allen, 1953

Species of roundworm

Pratylenchus goodeyi is a plant pathogenic nematode infecting bananas. It is native to the mountainous regions of Africa. There it is considered the second most devastating nematode after R. similis, especially under poor management.
