= Pratylenchus pratensis =

Scientific classification
- Domain: Eukaryota
- Kingdom: Animalia
- Phylum: Nematoda
- Class: Secernentea
- Order: Tylenchida
- Family: Pratylenchidae
- Genus: Pratylenchus
- Species: P. pratensis

Binomial name
- Pratylenchus pratensis (de Man, 1880)

Species of roundworm

Pratylenchus pratensis is a plant pathogenic nematode. Hosts include English holly, oat, corn, alfalfa, strawberry, and clover.
