= Boleodorus =

Scientific classification
- Domain: Eukaryota
- Kingdom: Animalia
- Phylum: Nematoda
- Class: Secernentea
- Order: Tylenchida
- Family: Tylenchidae
- Genus: Boleodorus; Thorne, 1941

Genus of roundworms

Boleodorus is a genus of nematodes belonging to the family Tylenchidae.

The genus has almost cosmopolitan distribution.

Species:

- Boleodorus abnormus Khan & Basir, 1964
- Boleodorus acurvus Jairajpuri, 1982
- Boleodorus acutus Thorne & Malek, 1968
- Boleodorus azadkashmirensis Maqbool, Shahina & Firoza, 1990
- Boleodorus bambosus Mohilal, Anandi & Dhanachand, 1997
- Boleodorus citri Edward & Rai, 1970
- Boleodorus clavicaudatus Thorne, 1941
- Boleodorus constrictus Rahman & Ahmad, 1996
- Boleodorus cylindricus Dhanachand, Renubala & Anandi, 1993
- Boleodorus cynodoni Fotedar & Mahajan, 1974
- Boleodorus filiformis Husain & Khan, 1977
- Boleodorus flexuosus Eroshenko, 1982
- Boleodorus hyderi Husain & Khan, 1965
- Boleodorus impar Khan & Basir, 1964
- Boleodorus innuptus (Andrássy, 1961) Siddiqi, 1963
- Boleodorus minustylus Mohilal, Anandi & Dhanachand, 1997
- Boleodorus mirus Khan, 1964
- Boleodorus modicus Lal & Khan, 1988
- Boleodorus neosimilis Geraert, 1971
- Boleodorus pakistanensis Siddiqi, 1963
- Boleodorus punici Gambhir & Dhanachand, 1997
- Boleodorus rafiqi Husain & Khan, 1965
- Boleodorus similis Khan & Basir, 1963
- Boleodorus solomonensis Ye & Geraert, 1997
- Boleodorus spiralis Egunjobi, 1968
- Boleodorus tenuis Lal & Khan, 1988
- Boleodorus teres Nanjappa & Khan, 1972
- Boleodorus thylactis
- Boleodorus thylactus Thorne, 1941
- Boleodorus typicus Husain & Khan, 1968
- Boleodorus volutus Lima & Siddiqi, 1963
- Boleodorus zaini Maqbool, 1982
