= Radopholus =

Scientific classification
- Domain: Eukaryota
- Kingdom: Animalia
- Phylum: Nematoda
- Class: Secernentea
- Order: Tylenchida
- Family: Pratylenchidae
- Genus: Radopholus; Thorne, 1949

Genus of roundworms

Radopholus is a genus of nematodes belonging to the family Pratylenchidae.

The genus has almost cosmopolitan distribution.

Species:

- Radopholus arabocoffeae Trinh, Nguyen, Waeyenberge, Subbotin, Karssen & Moens, 2004
- Radopholus bridgei Siddiqi & Hahn, 1995
- Radopholus cavenessi Egunjobi, 1968
- Radopholus citri Machon & Bridge, 1996
- Radopholus clarus Colbran, 1971
- Radopholus colbrani Kumar, 1980
- Radopholus crenatus Colbran, 1971
- Radopholus daklakensis Trinh, Waeyenberge, Nguyen & Moens, 2012
- Radopholus duriophilus Nguyen, Subbotin, Madani, Trinh & Moens, 2003
- Radopholus inaequalis Sauer, 1958
- Radopholus inanis Colbran, 1971
- Radopholus inequalis
- Radopholus intermedius Colbran, 1971
- Radopholus kahikateae Ryss & Wouts, 1997
- Radopholus megadorus Colbran, 1971
- Radopholus musicola Stanton, Mundo-Ocampo, Baldwin & Kaplan, 2001
- Radopholus nativus Sher, 1968
- Radopholus nelsonensis Ryss & Wouts, 1997
- Radopholus neosimilis Sauer, 1958
- Radopholus rectus Colbran, 1971
- Radopholus rotundisemenus Sher, 1968
- Radopholus serratus Colbran, 1971
- Radopholus similis (Cobb, 1893) Thorne, 1949
- Radopholus vangundyi Sher, 1968
- Radopholus vertexplanus Sher, 1968
