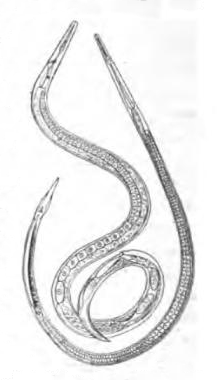
- Tylenchus devastatrix Kühn, male and female, after Debray and Maupas, illustration (figures 86 and 87) from book Histoire de la pomme de terre by Ernest Roze (Paris, 1898); Author : Ernest Roze (1833–1900)

Scientific classification
- Domain: Eukaryota
- Kingdom: Animalia
- Phylum: Nematoda
- Class: Secernentea
- Order: Tylenchida
- Family: Tylenchidae
- Genus: Tylenchus; Bastian, 1865

Species
- Tylenchus devastatrix; Tylenchus elegans

= Tylenchus =

Genus of roundworms

Tylenchus is a genus of nematodes in the family Tylenchidae and subfamily Tylenchinae.
