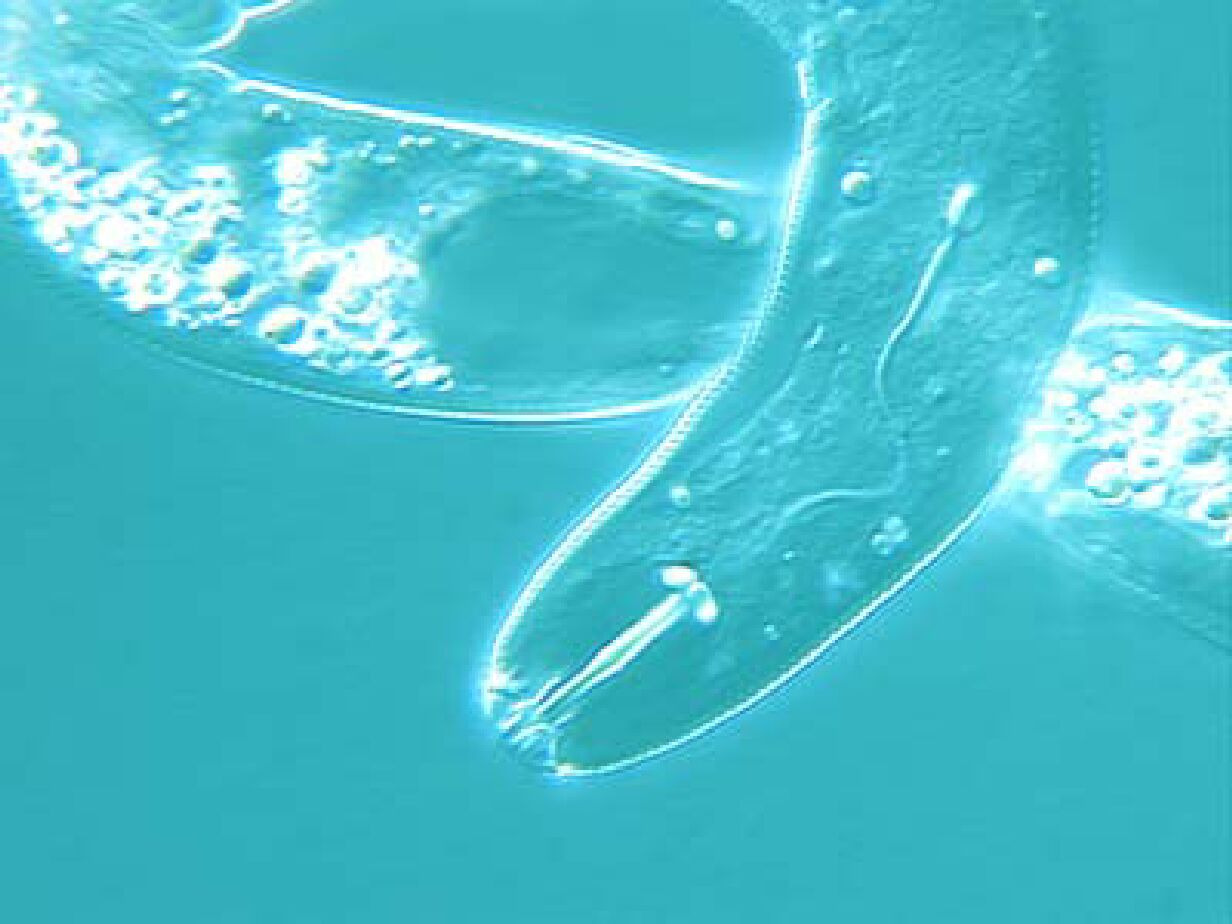

Scientific classification
- Kingdom: Animalia
- Phylum: Nematoda
- Class: Chromadorea
- Order: Rhabditida
- Family: Pratylenchidae
- Genus: Pratylenchus
- Species: P. neglectus

Binomial name
- Pratylenchus neglectus (Rensch, 1924) Filipjev and Schuurmans Stekhoven, 1941

= Pratylenchus neglectus =

Species of roundworm

Pratylenchus neglectus is a plant-pathogenic nematode infecting potato, alfalfa and mint.
