= Achlysiella =

Scientific classification
- Domain: Eukaryota
- Kingdom: Animalia
- Phylum: Nematoda
- Class: Secernentea
- Order: Tylenchida
- Family: Pratylenchidae
- Genus: Achlysiella; Hunt, Bridge & Machon, 1989

Genus of worms

Achlysiella is a genus of nematodes belonging to the family Pratylenchidae.

The species of this genus are found in Australia and Central America.

Species:

- Achlysiella brevicaudata (Colbran, 1971) Ebsary, 1991
- Achlysiella capitata (Colbran, 1971) Ebsary, 1991
- Achlysiella magniglans (Sher, 1968) Ebsary, 1991
- Achlysiella trilineata (Sher, 1968) Ebsary, 1991
- Achlysiella vacua (Colbran, 1971) Ebsary, 1991
- Achlysiella williamsi (Siddiqi, 1964) Hunt, Bridge & Machon, 1989
