= Basiria =

Scientific classification
- Domain: Eukaryota
- Kingdom: Animalia
- Phylum: Nematoda
- Class: Secernentea
- Order: Tylenchida
- Family: Tylenchidae
- Genus: Basiria; Siddiqi, 1959

Genus of roundworms

Basiria is a genus of nematodes.
