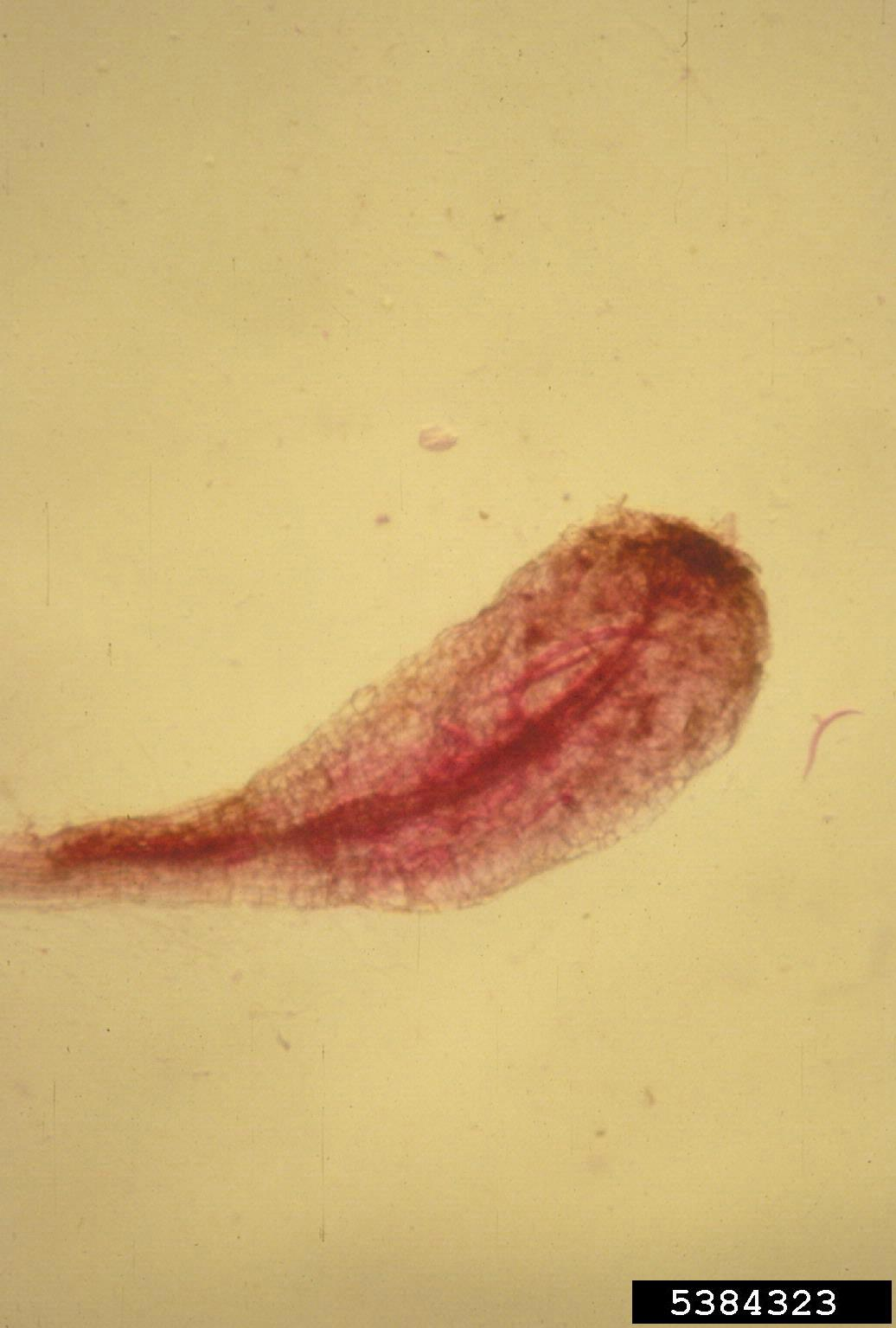

Scientific classification
- Domain: Eukaryota
- Kingdom: Animalia
- Phylum: Nematoda
- Class: Secernentea
- Order: Tylenchida
- Family: Pratylenchidae
- Subfamily: Nacobbinae; Chitwood in Chitwood & Chitwood, 1950
- Genus: Nacobbus; Thorne & Allen, 1944

Species
- Nacobbus aberrans (Thorne, 1935); Nacobbus dorsalis Thorne & Allen, 1944

= Nacobbus =

Genus of roundworms

Nacobbus is a genus of plant-parasitic nematodes. Prevalent in North and South America, the genus Nacobbus threatens crops such as tomato, potato, quinoa and sugarbeet. They can cause so much damage that they are considered to be of quarantine importance. The morphology and biology of Nacobbus is not all that well known, although it is possible that the host—in this case, a specific crop—influences how the morphological characteristics of these nematodes are expressed.

== Taxonomy ==
Two type species of Nacobbus, Nacobbus aberrans and Nacobbus dorsalis, were identified in 1944 by Thorne and Allen along with two additional possible species, N. batatiformis and N. serendipiticus. In 1970, Sher classified N. batatiformis and N. serendipiticus under the species Nacobbus aberrans. N. aberrans and N. dorsalis were concluded to be the only two species of Nacobbus and were differentiated by morphological characteristics. Today, the classification of Nacobbus into these two species is generally accepted as accurate. However, recent studies focused on morphology and host-range suggest that this classification may need to be reevaluated. Proper classification of the genus is crucial in order to most effectively manage and quarantine them.

== Life cycle ==
In terms of feeding strategy, Nacobbus is classified as a false root-knot nematode because it is both migratory endoparasitic and sedentary endoparasitic. It is the only known nematode to do so; all others employ either one strategy or the other. In Nacobbus, each strategy is employed at different stages in the life cycle. Immature males and females are migratory whereas mature females are sedentary. The life cycle of Nacobbus begins when they hatch from eggs in the soil and migrate through roots and soil until mature, causing necrotic lesions. Then, mature females form a feeding site called a syncytium, which is composed of plant material and formed in healthy root tissue. There the females produce eggs and lay them in the soil to hatch.
