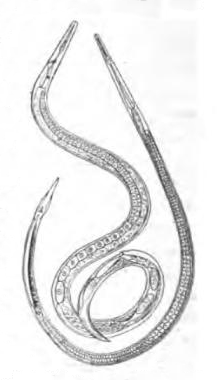

Scientific classification
- Kingdom: Animalia
- Phylum: Nematoda
- Class: Chromadorea
- Order: Rhabditida
- Superfamily: Tylenchoidea
- Family: Tylenchidae; Örley, 1880

Subfamilies
- Atylenchinae; Boleodorinae; Ecphyadophorinae; Tylenchinae; Tylodorinae

Synonyms
- Tylodoridae

= Tylenchidae =

Family of roundworms

Tylenchidae is a family of nematodes. They are an important group of soil dwelling species that frequently contributes as much as 30% to the nematode species richness of soil samples. They diverged relatively early on and many species pose little risk to economically important plant species. Due to their early divergence, species tend to have relatively basal characteristics. They tend to be small and slender with small and delicate piercing mouthparts.

It contains the following subfamilies and genera:

Atylenchinae

- Aglenchus
- Antarctenchus
- Atylenchus
- Caslenchus
- Pleurotylenchus

Boleodorinae

- Atetylenchus
- Basiria
- Boleodorus
- Neopsilenchus
- Neothada
- Psilenchus
- Ridgellus
- Thada

Ecphyadophorinae

- Chilenchus
- Ecphyadophora
- Ecphyadophoroides
- Epicharinema
- Lelenchus
- Mitranema
- Tenunemellus
- Tremonema
- Ultratenella

Tylenchinae

- Allotylenchus
- Cervoannulatus
- Cucullitylenchus
- Discotylenchus
- Filenchus
- Fraglenchus
- Gracilancea
- Irantylenchus
- Malenchus
- Miculenchus
- Polenchus
- Sakia
- Silenchus
- Tanzanius
- Tylenchus

Tylodorinae

- Arboritynchus
- Campbellenchus
- Caphalenchus
- Eutylenchus
- Tylodorus
