= Ecphyadophora =

Scientific classification
- Domain: Eukaryota
- Kingdom: Animalia
- Phylum: Nematoda
- Class: Secernentea
- Order: Tylenchida
- Family: Tylenchidae
- Genus: Ecphyadophora de Man, 1921

Genus of roundworms

Ecphyadophora is a genus of nematodes belonging to the family Tylenchidae.

The genus has almost cosmopolitan distribution.

Species:

- Ecphyadophora basiri Verma, 1972
- Ecphyadophora caelata Raski & Geraert, 1986
- Ecphyadophora elongata (Maqbool & Shahina, 1985) Geraert & Raski, 1987
- Ecphyadophora goodeyi Husain & Khan, 1965
- Ecphyadophora quadralata Corbett, 1964
- Ecphyadophora tenuissima de Man, 1921
- Ecphyadophora teres Raski, Koshy & Sosamma, 1982
- Ecphyadophora vallipuriensis Husain & Khan, 1968
