= Lelenchus =

Scientific classification
- Domain: Eukaryota
- Kingdom: Animalia
- Phylum: Nematoda
- Class: Secernentea
- Order: Tylenchida
- Family: Tylenchidae
- Genus: Lelenchus; Andrássy, 1954

Genus of roundworms

Lelenchus is a genus of nematodes belonging to the family Tylenchidae.

The genus has almost cosmopolitan distribution.

Species:

- Lelenchus brevislitus Soleymanzadeh
- Lelenchus filicaudatus Raski & Geraert, 1986
- Lelenchus leptosoma (de Man, 1880) Andrássy, 1954
- Lelenchus schmitti Bernard, 2005
