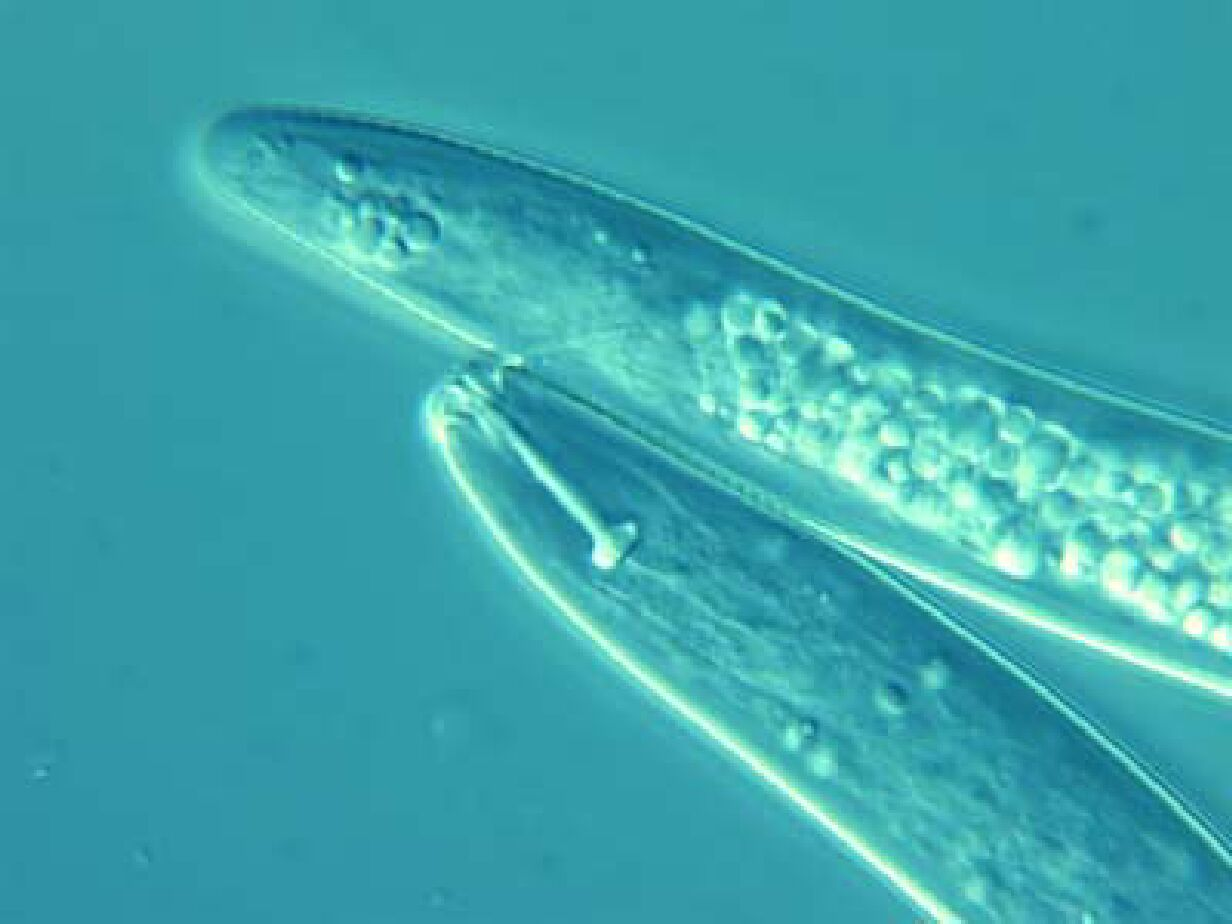
- Pratylenchus coffeae

Scientific classification
- Kingdom: Animalia
- Phylum: Nematoda
- Class: Chromadorea
- Order: Rhabditida
- Superfamily: Tylenchoidea
- Family: Pratylenchidae; Thorne, 1949

Genera
- Achlysiella; Hirschmanniella; Radopholus; Pratylenchus

= Pratylenchidae =

Family of roundworms

Pratylenchidae is a family of plant pathogenic nematodes.

Members include Achlysiella williamsi.
