= List of sugarcane diseases =

This article is a list of diseases of sugarcane (Saccharum spp. hybrids).

== Bacterial diseases ==
Bacterial diseases
Gumming disease	Xanthomonas axonopodis pv. vasculorum
Leaf scald	Xanthomonas albilineans
Mottled stripe	Herbaspirillum rubrisubalbicans
Ratoon stunting disease	Leifsonia xyli subsp. xyli
Red stripe (top rot)	Acidovorax avenae subsp. avenae

== Fungal diseases ==
Fungal diseases
Banded sclerotial (leaf) disease	Thanatephorus cucumeris = Pellicularia sasakii Rhizoctonia solani [anamorph]
Black rot	Ceratocystis adiposa Chalara sp. [anamorph]
Black stripe	Cercospora atrofiliformis
Brown spot	Cercospora longipes
Brown stripe	Cochliobolus stenospilus Bipolaris stenospila [anamorph]
Downy mildew	Peronosclerospora sacchari = Sclerospora sacchari
Downy mildew, leaf splitting form	Peronosclerospora miscanthi = Sclerospora mischanthi Mycosphaerella striatiformans
Eye spot	Bipolaris sacchari = Helminthosporium sacchari
Fusarium sett and stem rot	Gibberella fujikuroi Fusarium moniliforme [anamorph] Gibberella subglutinans
Iliau	Clypeoporthe iliau = Gnomonia iliau Phaeocytostroma iliau [anamorph]
Leaf blast	Didymosphaeria taiwanensis
Leaf blight	Leptosphaeria taiwanensis Stagonospora tainanensis [anamorph]
Leaf scorch.	Stagonospora sacchari
Marasmius sheath and shoot blight	Marasmiellus stenophyllus = Marasmius stenophyllus
Myriogenospora leaf binding (tangle top)	Myriogenospora aciculispora
Phyllosticta leaf spot	Phyllosticta hawaiiensis
Phytophthora rot of cuttings	Phytophthora spp. Phytophthora megasperma
Pineapple disease	Ceratocystis paradoxa Chalara paradoxa = Thielaviopsis paradoxa [anamorph]
Pokkah boeng (that may have knife cut symptoms)	Gibberella fujikuroi Fusarium moniliforme [anamorph] Gibberella subglutinans
Red leaf spot (purple spot)	Dimeriella sacchari
Red rot	Glomerella tucumanensis = Physalospora tucumanensis Colletotrichum falcatum [anamorph]
Red rot of leaf sheath and sprout rot	Athelia rolfsii = Pellicularia rolfsii Sclerotium rolfsii [anamorph]
Red spot of leaf sheath	Mycovellosiella vaginae = Cercospora vaginae
Rhizoctonia sheath and shoot rot	Rhizoctonia solani
Rind disease (sour rot)	Phaeocytostroma sacchari = Pleocyta sacchari = Melanconium sacchari
Ring spot	Leptosphaeria sacchari Phyllosticta sp. [anamorph]
Root rots	Marasmius sacchari Pythium arrhenomanes Pythium graminicola Rhizoctonia sp. Unidentified Oomycete
Rust, common	Puccinia melanocephala = Puccinia erianthi
Rust, orange	Puccinia kuehnii
Schizophyllum rot	Schizophyllum commune
Sclerophthora disease	Sclerophthora macrospora
Seedling blight	Alternaria alternata Bipolaris sacchari Cochliobolus hawaiiensis Bipolaris hawaiiensis [anamorph] Cochliobolus lunatus Curvularia lunata [anamorph] Curvularia senegalensis Setosphaeria rostrata Exserohilum rostratum [anamorph] = Drechslera halodes
Sheath rot	Cytospora sacchari
Smut, culmicolous	Sporisorium scitamineum
Target blotch	Helminthosporium sp.
Veneer blotch	Deightoniella papuana
White rash	Elsinoë sacchari Sphaceloma sacchari [anamorph]
Wilt	Fusarium sacchari = Cephalosporium sacchari
Yellow spot	Mycovellosiella koepkei = Cercospora koepkei
Zonate leaf spot	Gloeocercospora sorghi

== Miscellaneous diseases and disorders ==
Miscellaneous diseases and disorders
Bud proliferation	Undetermined
Bunch top	Undetermined
Cluster stool	Undetermined
Internal stalk necrosis	Undetermined
Leaf freckle	Undetermined
Leaf stipple	
Multiple buds	Undetermined
Stem galls	Undetermined

== Nematodes, parasitic ==
Nematodes, parasitic
Lesion	Pratylenchus spp.
Root-knot	Meloidogyne spp.
Spiral	Helicotylenchus spp. Rotylenchus spp. Scutellonema spp.

== Viral diseases ==
Viral diseases
Dwarf	Sugarcane dwarf virus
Fiji disease	Sugarcane Fiji disease virus
Mosaic	Sugarcane mosaic virus
Sereh	Sugarcane sereh disease (virus presumed)
Streak disease	Maize streak virus, sugarcane strain
Yellow Leaf	Sugarcane Yellow Leaf Virus

== Protozoan diseases ==
Protozoan diseases
Chlorotic streak	Phytocercomonas venanatans

== Phytoplasma diseases ==
Phytoplasmas were previously known as 'mycoplasma-like organisms' (MLOs).

Phytoplasma diseases
Grassy Shoot (SCGS), Leaf Chlorosis, Early Bud Sprouting,	Sugarcane Grassy Shoot Phytoplasma related to 'Candidatus Phytoplasma sacchari',

== Unsure causal agent diseases ==
- Ramu stunt disease, a disease widespread throughout Papua New Guinea, but not detected in Australia
