= Holing cane =

Planting of sugar cane by slave gangs

Holing cane was a process by which slave labor gangs planted sugar cane on plantations.

Field slaves were generally divided into three gangs based on their ability to work. The lead gang was responsible for digging cane holes; the second gang would plant the cane cuttings, and the third gang—typically composed of the least able-bodied workers and the very young—would be required to weed the fields, catch rats, and serve as gofers.

The process began with white field supervisors marking off the cane field in a checkerboard of 4-to-5-foot (1.2 to 1.5 m) squares. Within each square the lead gang would dig a hole approximately 6 to 9 inches (150 to 230 mm) deep and 2 to 3 feet (0.61 to 0.91 m) long. This back-breaking labor was often complicated by wet weather or parched soil, and a network of cut canes and roots from the previous year's planting.

The secondary gang would set cuttings of the previous year's cane in the holes and cover them with a mixture of manure and soil. The manure mixture was carried by hand in baskets to avoid damage to the plantings. The cuttings would be arranged in rows to allow the prevailing winds to disperse moisture in and around the cane, reducing the chances of fungal diseases, which ruined many crops each year (see List of sugarcane diseases).

Cane holing was such brutal work that many plantation owners contracted with jobbing gangs to plant the crop in order to protect their capital investment in their own enslaved workforce.
