= Beta-galactofuranosidase =

Enzyme

Identifiers
- EC no.: 3.2.1.146
- CAS no.: 52357-57-0

Databases
- IntEnz: IntEnz view
- BRENDA: BRENDA entry
- ExPASy: NiceZyme view
- KEGG: KEGG entry
- MetaCyc: metabolic pathway
- PRIAM: profile
- PDB structures: RCSB PDB PDBe PDBsum
Search
- PMC: articles
- PubMed: articles
- NCBI: proteins

Beta-galactofuranosidase (EC 3.2.1.146, exo-beta-galactofuranosidase, exo-beta-D-galactofuranosidase, beta-D-galactofuranosidase) is an enzyme with systematic name beta-D-galactofuranoside hydrolase. This enzyme catalyses the following chemical reaction

Hydrolysis of terminal non-reducing beta-D-galactofuranosides, releasing [galactose]

The enzyme from Helminthosporium sacchari detoxifies helminthosporoside.
