= Sugarcane grassy shoot disease =

Phytoplasma (bacterial) disease

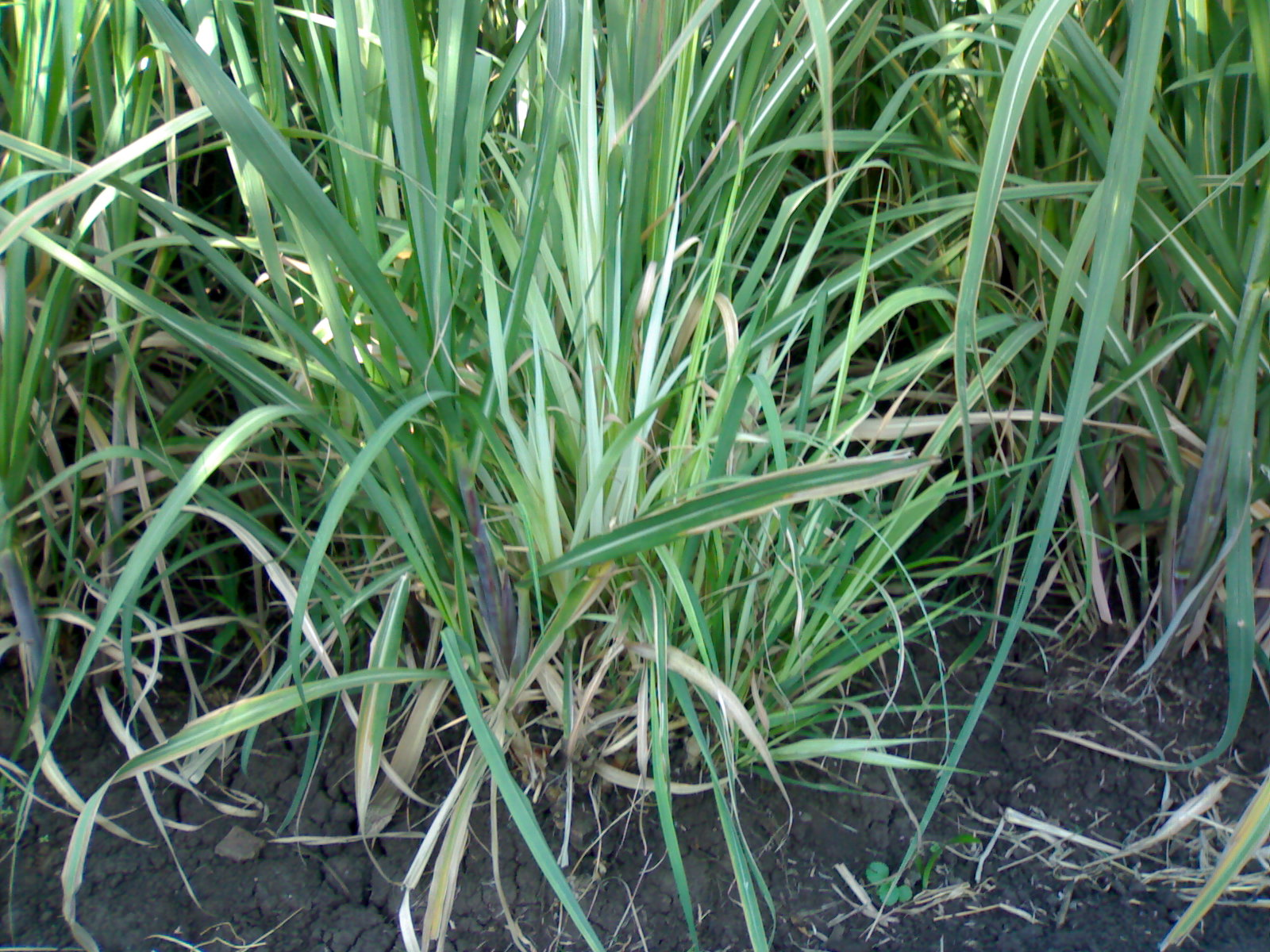
- Typical symptoms of Sugarcane Grassy Shoot (SCGS) disease
- Common names: SCGS, Sugarcane grassy shoot disease; GSD, Grassy Shoot disease
- Causal agents: 'Candidatus Phytoplasma sacchari'
- Hosts: Sugarcane (Saccharum officinarum L.)
- Vectors: leafhoppers (Saccharosydne saccharivora, Matsumuratettix hiroglyphicus,Deltocephalus vulgaris and Yamatotettix flavovittatus)
- EPPO Code: PHYP48
- Distribution: Southeast Asia and India

Sugarcane grassy shoot disease (SCGS), is associated with 'Candidatus Phytoplasma sacchari' which are small, pleomorphic, pathogenic mycoplasma that contribute to yield losses from 5% up to 20% in sugarcane. These losses are higher in the ratoon crop. A higher incidence of SCGS has been recorded in some parts of Southeast Asia and India, resulting in 100% loss in cane yield and sugar production.

== SCGS disease symptoms ==
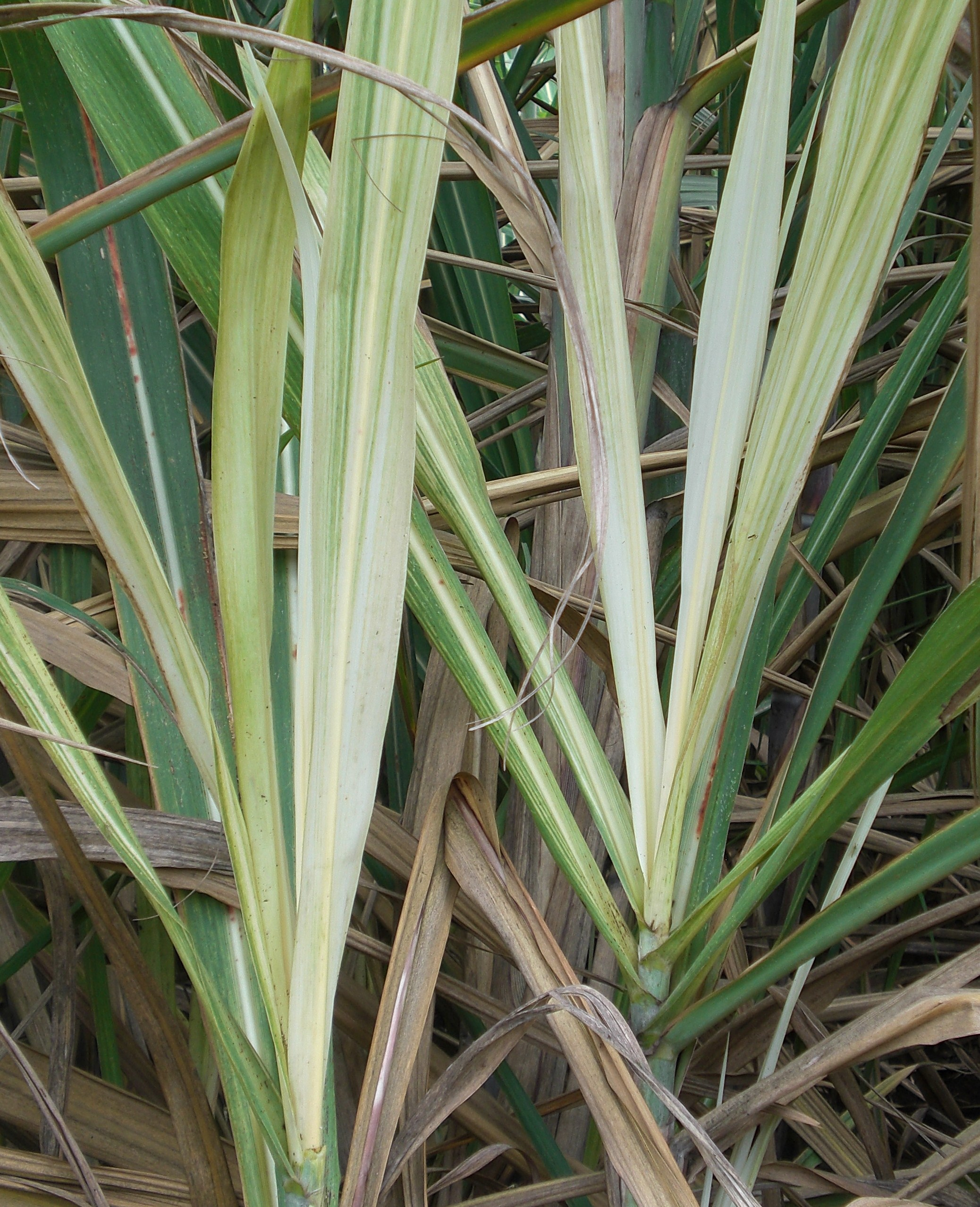
Complete leaf chlorosis in SCGS disease

Phytoplasma-infected sugarcane plants show a proliferation of tillers, which give it typical grassy appearance, hence the name grassy shoot disease. The leaves of infected plants do not produce chlorophyll, and therefore appear white or creamy yellow. The leaf veins turn white first as the phytoplasma resides in leaf phloem tissue. Symptoms at the early stage of the plant life cycle include leaf chlorosis, mainly at the central leaf whorl. Infected plants do not have the capacity to produce food in the absence of chlorophyll, which results in no cane formation. These symptoms can be seen prominently in the stubble crop. The eye or lateral buds sprout before the normal time on growing cane. A survey of various fields of western Maharashtra showed grassy shoot with chlorotic or creamy white leaves was the most prevalent phenotype in sugarcane plants infected with SCGS.

== Causal organism ==
SCGS disease is related to 'Candidatus Phytoplasma sacchari, which is one of the most destructive pathogens of sugarcane (Saccharum officinarum L.). In India, SCGS phytoplasmas are spreading at an alarming rate, adversely affecting the yield of the sugarcane crop. Phytoplasmas formerly called mycoplasma-like organisms (MLOs), are a large group of obligate, intracellular, cell wallless parasites classified within the class Mollicutes. Phytoplasmas are associated with plant diseases and are known to cause more than 600 diseases in several hundred plant species, including gramineous weeds and cereals. The symptoms shown by infected plants include: whitening or yellowing of the leaves, shortening of the internodes (leading to stunted growth), smaller leaves and excessive proliferation of shoots, resulting in a broom phenotype and loss of apical dominance .

== Transmission ==
Sugarcane is a vegetatively propagated crop, so the pathogen is transmitted via seed material and by phloem-feeding leafhopper vectors. Saccharosydne saccharivora, Matsumuratettix hiroglyphicus, Deltocephalus vulgaris and Yamatotettix flavovittatus have been confirmed as vectors for phytoplasma transmission in sugarcane. Unconfirmed reports also suggest a spread through the steel blades (machetes) used for sugarcane harvesting.

== Detection ==
Phytoplasma-infected sugarcane can be recognized by visual symptoms, but there are limitations. Visual symptoms occur only after considerable growth, normally two to three weeks after planting. If not observed keenly, confusion may occur on differences between symptoms of SCGS disease and iron deficiency. In addition to above points, the poor relationship between symptoms and phytoplasma presence has been confirmed by earlier findings that symptoms alone are not reliable indicators of infection or identity. This highlights the importance of employing tests, such as molecular tests, to verify associations between phytoplasma and putative disease symptoms. Also, it suggests the inability to recognize symptomless sugarcane harbouring a phytoplasma could result in inadvertent exposure of sugarcane to a potential disease source. Precise diagnosis is, therefore, necessary for effective disease identification and control. Though reliable, DNA hybridization, electron microscopy and PCR techniques require specialized equipment and trained human resources. Among these, polymerase chain reaction (PCR) is an accurate, economical and convenient method, which allows analysis of samples in a short time.

In recent years, regions of the rRNA operon of the prokaryotic and eukaryotic organisms have been sequenced and are being used to develop PCR-based detection assays. These sequences are highly specific to the infecting organism.

The ribosomal DNA contains one transcriptional unit with a cluster of genes coding for the 18S, 5.8S and 28S rRNAs and two internal transcribed spacer regions, ITS1 and ITS2 in eukaryotes, and for 16S, 5S and 23S in prokaryotes . Previous studies have demonstrated the complex ITS regions are useful in measuring close genealogical relationships because they exhibit greater interspecies differences than the smaller and larger subunits of rRNA genes. The use of specific probes as selective PCR primers offers an impressive approach for the rapid identification of a large number of phytoplasma isolates.

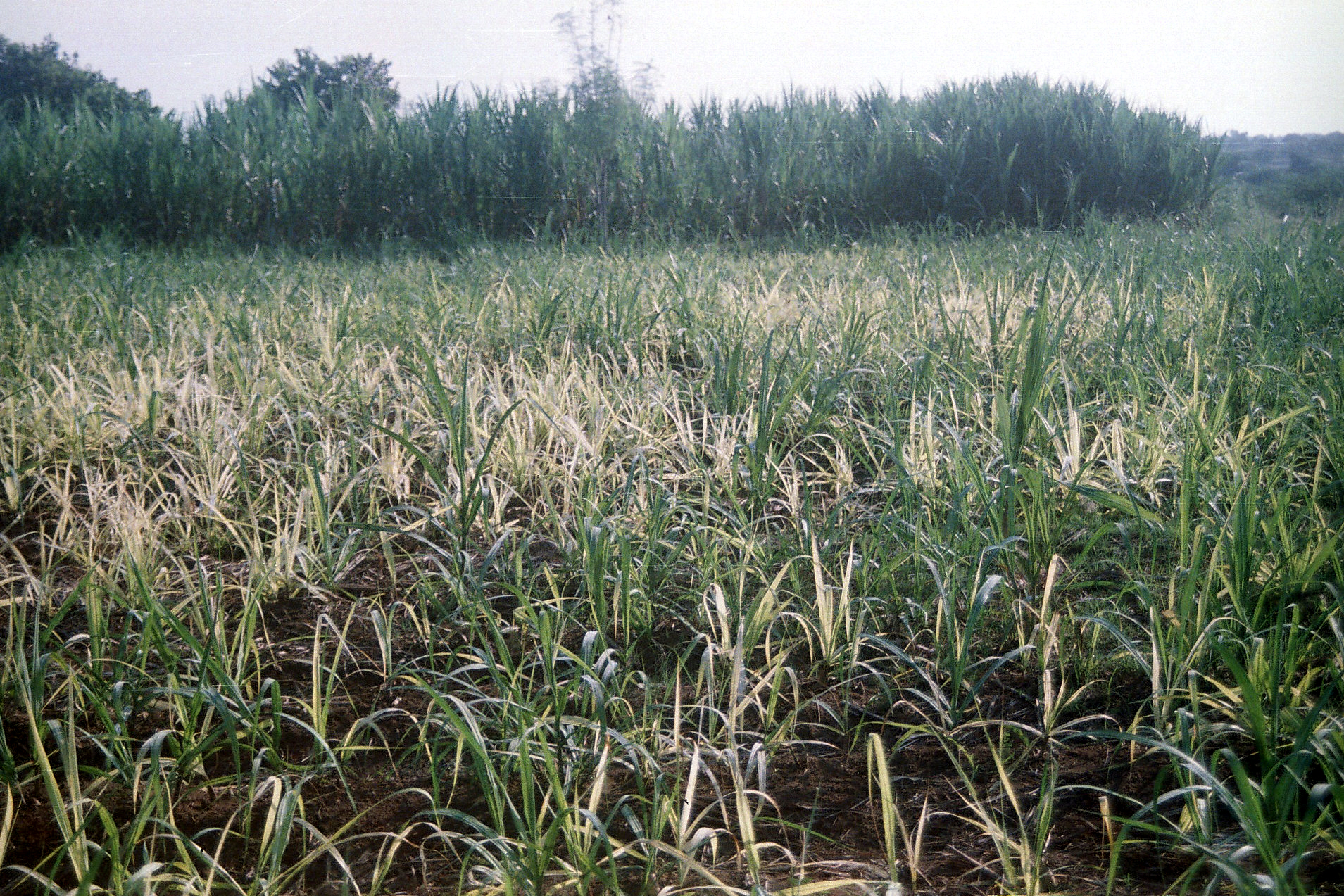
Sugarcane crop showing iron deficiency

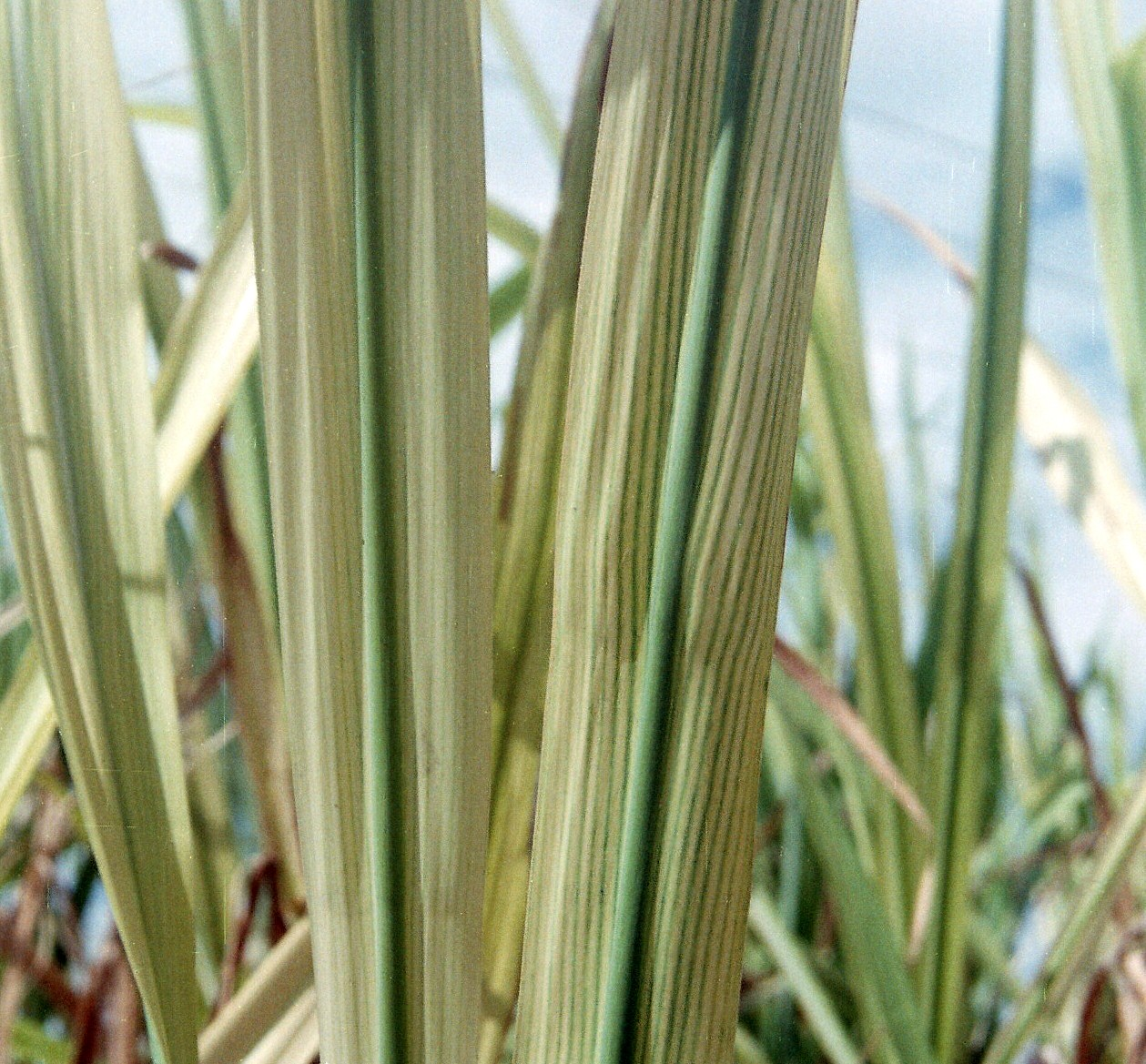
Interveinal chlorosis due to iron deficiency

== Control ==
In SCGS disease, the primary concern is to prevent the disease rather than treat it. Large numbers of phytoplasma-infected seed sets used by the farmers usually cause fast SCGS disease spread. Healthy, certified 'disease-free' sugarcane sets are suggested as planting material. If disease symptoms are visible within two weeks after planting, such plants can be replaced by healthy plants. Uprooted infected sugarcane plants need to disposed of by burning them.

Moist hot air treatment of sets is suggested to control infection before planting. This reduces the percentage of disease incidence, but causes a reduction in the percentage of bud sprouting. Reports that the disease spreads through steel blades used for sugarcane harvesting are unconfirmed, but treating the knives using a disinfectant or by dipping them in boiling water for some time is suggested as a precaution.

Phytoplasma infection also spreads through insect vectors; it is, therefore, important to control them. General field observation reports the ratoon crop has a higher percentage of disease incidence than the initial planted (main) crop. When the disease incidence is more than 20%, it is suggested to discontinue that crop cycle. It is always wise to purchase the certified planting material from authorized seed growers, which assures disease-free planting material.

== Sugarcane iron deficiency and SCGS disease ==
Symptoms of iron deficiency (interveinal chlorosis) are very similar to those of SCGS. It shows creamy leaves, but no chlorosis occurs in leaf veins, and they remain green. In the case of severe iron deficiency, veins may lose chlorophyll in the absence of iron and appear similar to SCGS disease. Iron deficiency is caused by a lack of iron nutrients in the soil; therefore, one may observe several plants showing symptoms of iron deficiency in localized patches in a field. Phytoplasma-infected plants, though, may occur anywhere in the field in a more random distribution. Treatment with 0.1% ferrous sulfate, either by spraying or supplying it through fertilizer cures iron deficiency, but phytoplasma-infected sugarcane does not respond to any treatment. Phytoplasma-infected plants growing in vitro show sensitivity to tetracycline.

== See also ==
- Sugar
- List of sugarcane diseases
- Vector (epidemiology)
- Chlorosis
