= Ratooning =

Agricultural practice of close-cutting a crop for regrowth

Ratooning is the agricultural practice of harvesting a monocot crop by cutting most of the above-ground portion but leaving the roots and the growing shoot apices intact so as to allow the plants to recover and produce a fresh crop in the next season. This practice is widely used in the cultivation of crops such as rice, sugarcane, banana, and pineapple. Ratoon crops cannot be perennially renewed, and may be harvested only for a few seasons, as a decline in yield tends to occur due to increased crowding, damage by pests and diseases, and decreasing soil fertility.

== History ==
The earliest record for ratooning, in a crop plant, can be traced back to the Vedic period in India. The Atharvaveda mentions that farmers cultivating barley (yava) used to cut barley plants many a time (20/125/2, Richa or Shloka No. 5755).

Chinese records of sugarcane ratooning exist from 1757, in Fujian Province.

== Etymology ==
The word ratoon probably owes its origin either from the Latin words retonsus, meaning 'to cut down' or retono, which means 'to thunder back' or 'resound'. In Spanish, the close words retoño and retoñar mean 'sprout' and 'to sprout'.

Terminology of ratooned crops varies, based on how far the crop extends from the original planting. The first harvest is called the plant crop, main crop or principal crop. Subsequent harvests are called first ratoon, second ratoon, etc.

== In sugarcane ==
Ratooning is an ancient method of propagation in sugarcane in which subterranean buds on the stubble (the part of cane left underground after harvesting) give rise to a new crop stand, which is usually referred to as the 'ratoon' or the 'stubble crop' as opposed to 'plant crop', which is raised from seeds or seedlings. Ratooning reduces the cost of cultivation by dispensing with additional seed material and some cultural practices such as land preparation and preparatory irrigation (palewa). It also results in early ripening of canes by at least a month or so, thus it adds to the effective crushing period. Sugarcane has a tremendous ratooning potential, and the oldest cultivated ratoon, being ratooned since 1757, in East China, in Fujian Province, stands to its testimony. The number of ratoons in sugarcane production cycles varies throughout the world, i.e., from one plant crop in Indonesia and some parts of China, one plant crop and a ratoon crop in India, Fiji and some parts of China, to six or more successive ratoons in Mauritius, Cuba, Venezuela, clayey soils of Zimbabwe, some parts of Puerto Rico, etc. The latter is also referred to as multiple ratooning. A decline in cane yield in successive ratoon crops, the so-called "ratoon decline", on the order of 20%, had been reported from many sugarcane-growing areas in India; the decline is more (up to 40% ) in subtropical India. Causes for this decline are: poor ratoon management, inherited differences in potential (ratoon) productivity, increasing incidence of diseases (like smut, grassy shoot disease, and red rot) which result in stands with gaps (studies conducted in India have shown that a gap over 10% significantly affects productivity of a ratoon crop), relatively less efficient enzyme systems (particularly nitrate reductase) activity, in vivo and prevalence of low temperatures during harvest, especially for early-ripening varieties and ratoon crop(s) in subtropical India which affects sprouting of stubble buds, etc. Insect pests also assume importance in a ratoon crop as stubble acts as a 'carry-over' of the inocula of pests both for coming up ratoon and for the neighbouring sugarcane crop(s), improperly looked-after crop gets infested by a number of insect pests, emerging sprouts of a ratoon crop favour rapid development and multiplication of some of the insect pests, and insect associated with stubble affect sprouting causing gaps which ultimately affect productivity of the ratoon crop, per se.

In Indian context, in subtropical India, ratoon initiated during spring (March) resulted in higher number of millable canes, cane yield and sucrose % juice in comparison to ratoon crops initiated either in winter (January) or summer (May). In peninsular India, however, as the sugarcane crop does not suffer extremes of weather conditions during summer and winters, differences in time of planting and harvest do not significantly influence the yield of succeeding ratoon crop.

Such a decline could be effectively prevented by proper ratoon management. Need for the latter stems from the famous Kalai (Aligarh, India) experiments conducted during 1939-1949. A good example of ratoon management and multiple ratooning is from Hoshalli village (in district Shimoga, Karnataka, India) where good yields of sugarcane ratoon crop (125-134 t/ha) were harvested year after year since 1968 without much loss in cane yield and quality. The crux for such a success was trash mulching, application of lime and irrigation after harvest of the crop every year. Ratooning has now become so much important in sugarcane production system that ratooning ability has become one of the important selection criteria for release of sugarcane varieties for commercial cultivation.

=== Assessment of ratooning ability ===
Yield of ratoon crop is a function of yield potential and its ratooning ability. The latter, by and large, envisages the extent of multiple ratooning and their relative yield performance as compared to corresponding plant crop. In India sugarcane varieties cultivated prior to introduction of Co varieties were not ratooned because of their susceptibility to insect-pests and diseases. Incorporation of S. spontaneum genome into modern sugarcane varieties has contributed to ratooning ability. The latter has been assessed by dry matter production of above ground parts at periodic harvests (at four-month intervals), the ratio of performance (of NMC and/or cane weight) of ratoon crop vs. plant crop. Characters like higher plant cane yield, stalk population and sprouting of stubble buds are useful in selecting good ratooners. Ratoon x environment interaction were high in varieties with poor ratooning ability and inherited differences in potential productivity appear to be responsible for ratoon decline. In Jamaica to calculate decline in ratoon productivity a Ratoon Performance Index (RPI) is used.

In India, the second major sugarcane growing country, among the sugarcane varieties released and notified from 2000 to 2015 for commercial cultivation Co 85004, Co 2001–13, Co 2001-15 Co 0218, Co 0403, Co 86249, Co 0237, CoPk 05191 are good ratooners and CoPant 90223, CoS 95255, CoS 94270, CoSe 92423 have been rated to be the excellent ratooners.

=== Growth and development of ratoon crop vis-à-vis plant crop ===
Buds on the lower half of the stubble give rise to most of the shoots in a ratoon. Initially, emerging shoots, for their development, depend on the nutrients stored in the stubble and for water supply on the roots attached to the stubble. Roots remain active up to 106 days after harvest although they are relatively less efficient in nutrient uptake, possibly due to suberization and ageing. The new root system (shoot roots from the developing shoots) develops 6–8 weeks after harvest, subject to soil and weather conditions. Ghosh et al. observed that, per unit root weight, shoots developed relatively more in the settlings raised from stubble buds as compared to those from top cane buds.

A ratoon crop ripens earlier by 4–6 weeks or so due to early development of shoots, maintenance of relatively lesser N content in index tissues, rapid run-out of N during grand growth phase and relatively higher inorganic non-sugars in its juice.

With each ratoon, the maximum number of canes generally increases white the average cane weight declines, although this can be mitigated with use of manure fertilisers. Interaction to space is relatively more pronounced in a ratoon crop as compared to its corresponding plant crop and perhaps due to this ratoon crops can tolerate a gap of 10% without any appreciable reduction in cane yield. Since optimal temperatures for tillering is 33.3–34.4 °C, winter-harvest of crop adversely affects tillering in an upcoming ratoon. If ratoon is initiated in April, tillering is profuse but mortality is high with poor growth of shoots. With successive ratooning, arrowing (flowering) increases.

In subtropical India, in crops which are harvested from November to mid-January the low temperatures result in poor sprouting of stubble buds, and the succeeding ratoon crop is invariably poor. Buds located on the stubble remain dormant and sprout only when favourable temperatures are available in February. This can be managed by either foliar application of growth regulators before harvest of plant crop or by treating the stubble. Stubble treatments that help sustain ratoon productivity include (a) stubble protection by spreading polyethylene cover, loosening soil around stubble, and trash mulching and irrigation at 10–15 days interval, (b) maintaining optimal clump population by gap filling using dug-out stubble, pre-germinated settlings, sprouts from clumps in the growing ratoon crop, (c) improving cultural conditions by intercropping with suitable varieties of guar, cow pea, moong and potato and (d) application of growth regulating substances to the stubble of freshly harvested cane like Cycocel.

=== Need for ratoon management ===
Need for ratoon management stems from its being an integral component of sugarcane production system, contributing to over half the cane acreage (it may increase when multiple ratooning is practiced); and as compared to corresponding plant crop, a ratoon crop has superficial roots, early shoot growth has to depend upon relatively less efficient root system (roots on the stubble), relatively less efficient enzyme system (especially the NRA), is infested/ infected more by insect-pests and diseases, ripens early and suffers ratoon decline.

The ICAR-Indian Institute of Sugarcane Research, Lucknow has identified certain technologies for ratoon management like dismantling of ridges, stubble shaving and off-barring at initiation of ratoon; gap filling when there is more than 45 cm distance (gap) between clumps; paired-row system of planting (120p x30) to reduce gaps and optimize plant population; trash mulching in alternate rows so as to conserve soil moisture, manage weeds and maintain soil organic carbon, etc. They have also designed and developed a tractor operated two-row Ratoon Management Device (RMD) to perform field operations for ratoon cultivation such as stubble shaving, deep tilling, off-barring, application of manure, fertilizers, bio-agents, etc., and finally earthing-up in a single pass to manage ratoon crop (0.35-0.4 ha/h) so as to improve its productivity. It also saves 60% on the cost of cultivation.

Studies on ratooning ability, overcoming ratoon decline, and early ripening of ratoons will be desirable in times to come.

=== Specific applications ===
The main benefits of ratooning are that the crop matures earlier (by one and half month or so) in the season and also decrease the cost of field preparation, preparatory irrigation as well as seed cane used for planting. By early maturing may increase the effective crushing duration of sugar mill adding to sugar production. At some places ratooning sugarcane (for short duration ratoon crops) has also been utilized to provide quality fodder for cattle.

Multiple ratooning of sugarcane, with proper management including plant protection, may be utilized for maintaining purity of new improved varieties as well as genetically modified plants, for a longer period of time.

== Other crops ==
Besides sugarcane, ratooning is also practiced commercially in many other crops. Examples include banana, cotton, mint, pearl millet, pigeon peas, pineapple, ramie, rice, and sorghum. Ratooning is frequently used on plants that will be processed for essential oils, fiber, and medicines.

Ratooning is most often used with crops which are known to give a steady yield for three years under most conditions. For example, the woody desert shrub guayule, an alternative source of natural rubber, is first harvested at two years, then ratooned annually in spring with a final crop that includes both tops and roots.

Rice is grown as a monocarpic annual plant. However, in tropical areas it can serve as a perennial, producing a ratoon crop, and may survive for up to 30 years.
