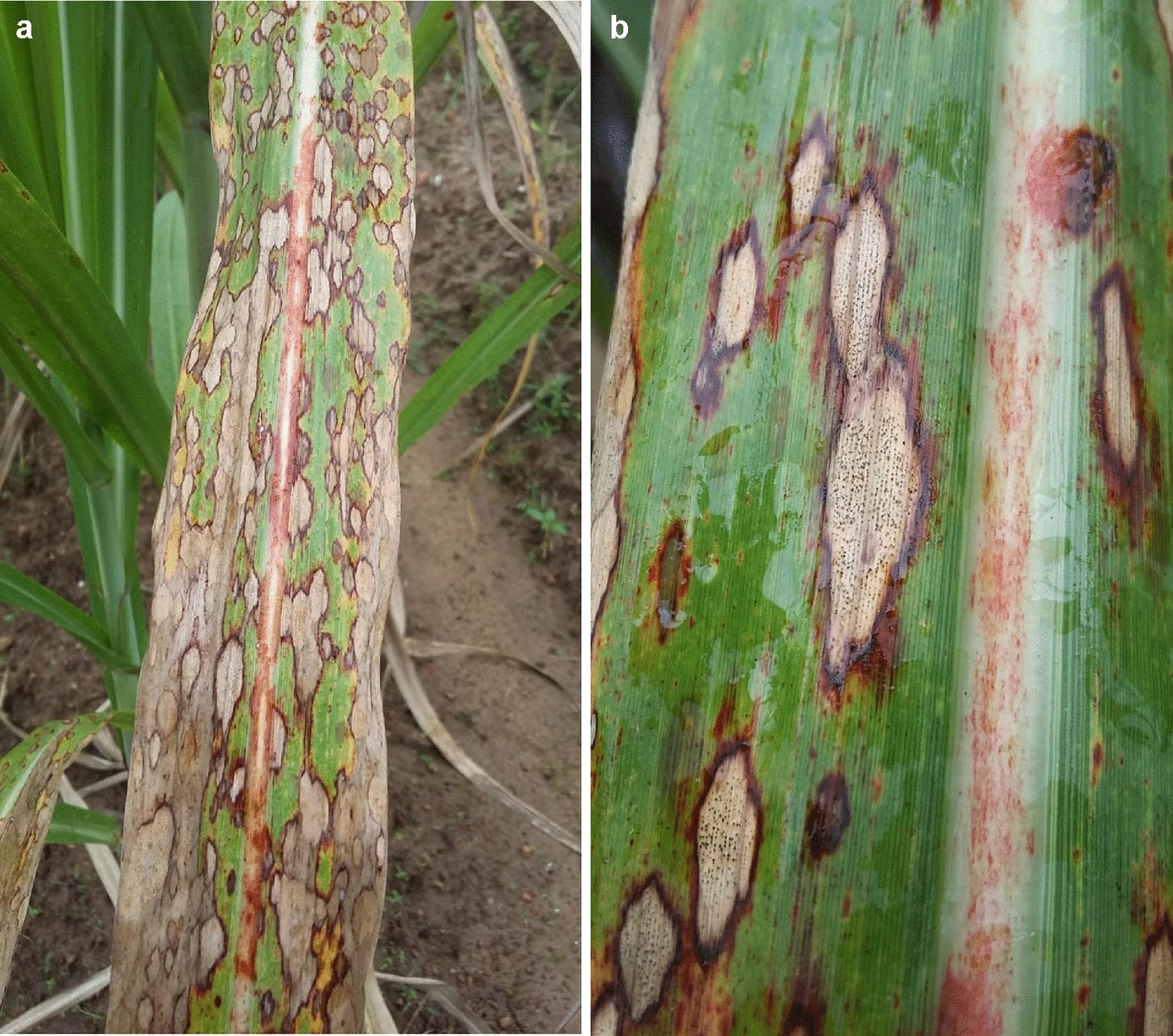
- Spots with red-brown borders result as a symptom ring spot from the fungal plant pathogen L. sacchari

Scientific classification
- Domain: Eukaryota
- Kingdom: Fungi
- Division: Ascomycota
- Class: Dothideomycetes
- Order: Pleosporales
- Family: Leptosphaeriaceae
- Genus: Leptosphaeria
- Species: L. sacchari

Binomial name
- Leptosphaeria sacchari Breda de Haan, (1892)

Synonyms
- Eriosphaeria sacchari Leptosphaerella sacchari Phaeosphaeria sacchari Phoma annullata Phoma glumicola Phoma sorghina Phyllosticta glumicola Phyllosticta sacchari Phyllosticta saccharicola Phyllosticta sorghina

= Leptosphaeria sacchari =

Species of fungus

Leptosphaeria sacchari (teleomorph—Phyllosticta sp) is a plant pathogenic fungus which causes a disease called ring spot on Saccharum officinarum. This species was originally described in 1890 by Kruger and in 1892 by Van Breda de Haan after it was discovered in the Dominican Republic. L. sacchari is the applied name, whereas Epicoccum sorghinum is the accepted name.

== Disease symptoms and control ==
=== Hosts and symptoms ===
Leptosphaeria sacchari is an ascomycete fungus whose only known host is sugarcane. The infection occurs on the leaves of lower canopy of the crop and starts out as small bronze spots. The spots elongate to become longer, irregular-shaped lesions (2.5 to 5 mm x 10 to 18 mm) with red-brown borders. The spots can merge and cause leaf chlorosis and later necrosis. In older lesions, L. sacchari can form small, black dots, but usually only on older leaves. These black dots can be identified as perithecia and pynidia.

=== Prevention methods ===
Due to its effect on older parts of the crop, ring spot is considered to be a minor disease with no economic importance. Therefore, prevention and control methods are not well established for L. sacchari and are instead aimed at more influential diseases such as brown rust (Puccinia melanocephala), orange rust (Puccinia kuehnii), smut (Sporisorium scitamineum) and others. One control method includes examining genotypes of sugarcane in order to select for more resistant species to prevent ring spot in future generations of the crop. Those which show high susceptibility to ring spot and other diseases are discarded. Calcium silicate slag, a soil amendment, has been shown to drastically impact sugarcane yield as well as lessen any impact ring spot may have on the crop.

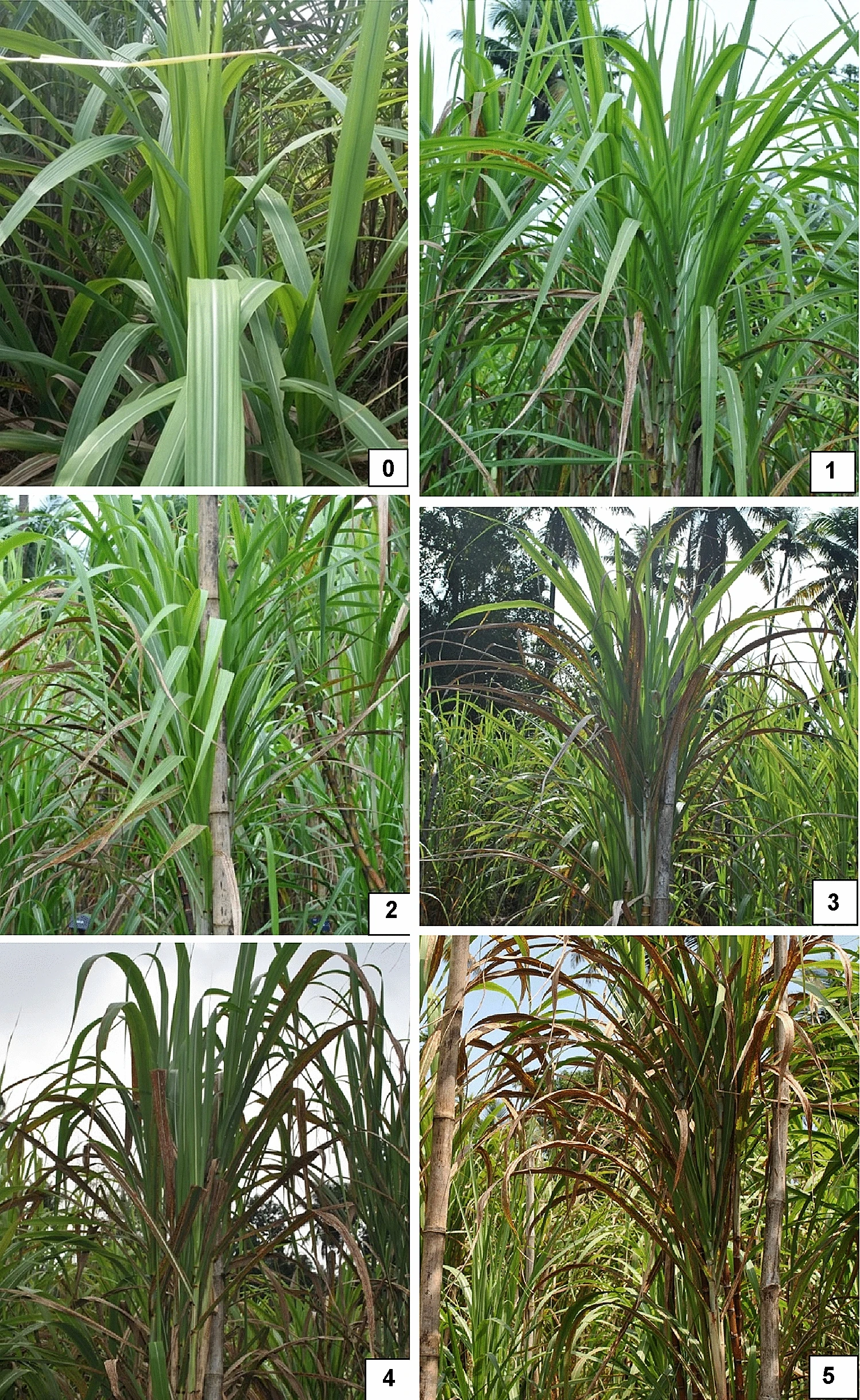
The disease rating scale of 0–5 developed by Echavez-Badel (1990) was used with slight modification to assess disease severity of ring spot in this study. Clones were categorized based on the ring spot disease scale (resistant (R) = 0–2, intermediate (I) =3 and susceptible (S) = 4–5) (Gopi et al., 2021).

== Microscopic characteristics and dispersal methods ==
Leptosphaeria sacchari produces globose to subglobose ascomata which can be up to 200 μm in size. Asci have an oblong-cylindric shape and are 40-60 X 8-12 μm. The ascospores are yellow to light brown in color and 18-23 X 3-5.5 μm and have a fusiform shape. Ring spot disease is spread through spores that are wind and rain-dispersed. This fungus has a preference for humid, tropical environments and can appear in sugarcane which has been planted in sandy or stony soils with low fertility. A hurricane in September 1928 was apparently responsible for bringing it to Florida from Puerto Rico.

== Importance ==
Although ring spot is currently only a minor disease with little to no known impact on crop yield, with the changing climate, worsening of plant diseases may occur in the near future. Some reports show that on occasion L. sacchari can cause leaf blight in sugarcane seedlings, which can cause water stress and other symptoms which are more likely to affect yield. In general, climate change is capable of turning any minor disease into a major one and can greatly affect communities which rely on particular crops for consumption or income purposes. In 1926, ring spot caused growth retardation on the island of Oahu and was responsible for serious outbreaks in susceptible varieties in multiple other tropical regions. Therefore, there is a need to study L. sacchari and other seemingly minor plant pathogens before they become dangerous and have larger and more devastating effects on environmental and human ecology.

== Geographical distribution ==
This fungal plant pathogen has been found in multiple continents including North America, Africa and Asia. L. sacchari has been cited in The United States (Florida), Cuba, Puerto Rico, Mexico, Dominican Republic, American Samoa, Sudan, Iraq, Thailand, India and multiple cities in China (Anhui, Guangdong, Fujian, Guangxi, Jiangxi).
