= Clypeoporthe =

Scientific classification
- Kingdom: Fungi
- Division: Ascomycota
- Class: Sordariomycetes
- Order: Diaporthales
- Family: Gnomoniaceae
- Genus: Clypeoporthe; Höhn.

Type species
- Clypeoporthe monocarpa Höhn.

Species
- C. andropogonis C. appendiculata C. bambusae C. brencklei C. iliau C. kriegeriana C. linearis C. monocarpa C. salviicola

Genus of fungi

Clypeoporthe is a genus of fungi in the family Gnomoniaceae. The genus contains four species.
