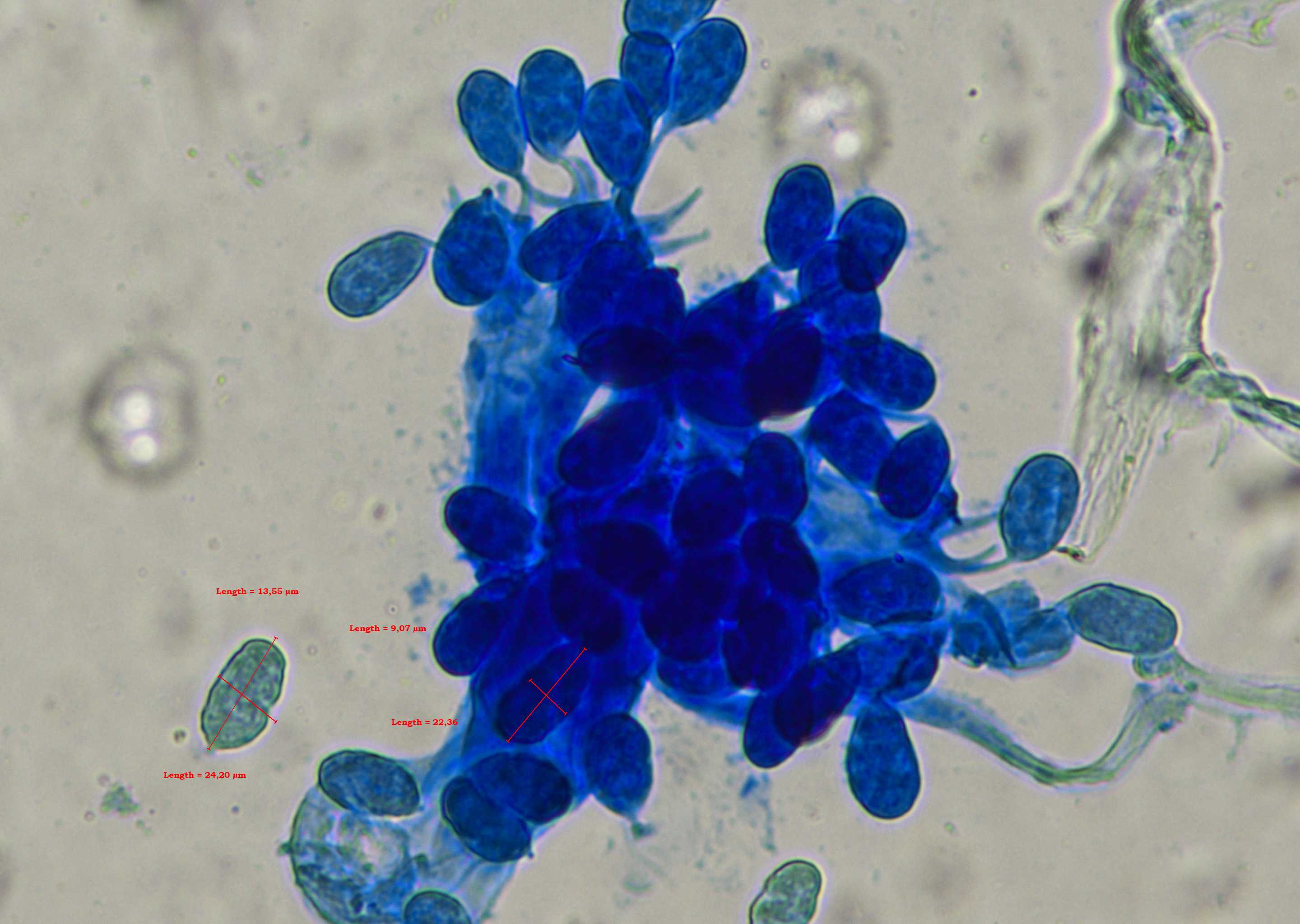
- Microscopic of Peronosclerospora philippinensis fungi on Zea mays

Scientific classification
- Domain: Eukaryota
- Clade: Diaphoretickes
- Clade: Sar
- Clade: Stramenopiles
- Phylum: Oomycota
- Order: Peronosporales
- Family: Peronosporaceae
- Genus: Peronosclerospora
- Species: P. philippinensis

Binomial name
- Peronosclerospora philippinensis (W.Weston) C.G.Shaw

Synonyms
- Sclerospora maydis Reinking; Sclerospora philippinensis W.Weston

= Peronosclerospora philippinensis =

Species of single-celled organism

Peronosclerospora philippinensis, commonly known as Philippine downy mildew, is a species of mildew of the fungal-like protist class Oomycetes. It is related to Phytophthora infestans, which caused the potato blight that led to the Great Irish famine.

Its hosts are typically grasses, cultivated and wild sorghum, sugarcane, and maize found in most of South and Southeast Asia, including India, China, and the Philippines. This disease results in reduced yield in crops, a withered appearance of the leaves, abortive reproductive structures, and a grayish down on the surfaces.

Historically, there have been cases of epidemics in which the species infected cultivars of maize and sugarcane and decimated the populations, causing up to $23 million US dollars’ worth of damage. Because of this, the USDA Animal and Plant Health Inspection Service included Philippine downy mildew on its Plant Pathogen Select Agent List until 2025.

== History ==
Philippine downy mildew was first briefly mentioned by Professor Baker of the College of Agriculture of the University of the Philippines in 1916 and then again in 1918 by Dr. Reinking, also of the College of Agriculture. His studies showed that the species had been present in the Philippines for more than 10 years already. It was not until 1920 when William Weston named it as Sclerospora philippinensis in a report, marking its similarities to its close relative Sclerospora sacchari. It continued to be known as Sclerospora philippinensis until 1980, when it was renamed Peronosclerospora philippinensis according to the shifts in the classification.

Yearly, there are one to two citations in biological journals. Research proves to be continual although scarce. Because of its former designation as a Select Agent, American scientists have had difficulty in obtaining samples within the United States to study the disease. In terms of gene sequences at GenBank of the National Center for Biotechnology Information, there are five, one complete sequence of an internal transcribed spacer and four partial sequences of internal transcribed spacers.

== Pathophysiology ==
Philippine downy mildew has been most studied on maize for its economic significance, but it shares similar symptoms with other hosts. A characteristic chlorosis, which develops from the loss of chlorophyll, and the downiness that gives the genus its popular name, are the two most common symptoms. The species also cause the growth of new leaves to be narrow and rigid, a stunting of shoots and roots, decreased production of pollen, and sterile and malformed ears. Mycelium extends throughout the entire plant except for the roots.

When the disease is transferred to a new host, there is a delay in virulence, known as parasitic fitness.

In maize, the reproductive tassels are malformed. The disease seems to stimulate growth while suppressing it in other areas of development: the anthers are atrophied while the female structure development is blocked. The resulting pollen is hollow and wrinkled.

=== Hosts ===
Socioeconomically important hosts are Zea mays and the Saccharum and Sorghum species due to their cultivation for crops and export. Other species of interest are the Graminaea species and many of the Andropogon, Bothriochloa, Schizachyrium, and Zea genera, which amounts to over 30 species. Most of these species are common grasses. Over 60 species, though, of the previously mentioned genera are resistant. The susceptible Andropogon and Bothriochloa species are significant because they are common across the United States, especially areas where corn is grown agriculturally, like Illinois.

=== Effects on fitness ===
Infection by Philippine downy mildew results in a lack of viable reproductive structures and often earlier death. In addition, the infected plant is more likely to be infected by a secondary pathogen, such as a species of Pythium, Helminthosporium, or Fusarium.

At the same time, when a section of the infected plant is transplanted to the soil, there is pronounced growth. This action seems to be by influence of the fungus-like protist to produce a large-enough host capable of transmitting spores.

=== Life cycle ===
Infection begins when conidia from nearby infected plants or those carried by the wind enter through the stomata by landing and developing a germ tube or hypha. The conidia germinate optimally in the early morning and with a high relative humidity. The haustoria extend from the hyphae of the mycelium and systemically invade the rest of the plant, draining nutrients.

Eventually, from the stomata, hyphae extend out and elongate, branching into sterigmata or conidiophores (spore-bearing structures). These then asexually bud into conidium spores. These structures create the characteristic grayish-white down-like appearance of downy mildew. Unlike other oomycetes, or Peronosclerospora, P. philippinensis is not known to produce oospores. There is no known sexual stage of the life cycle for P. philippinensis.

In dry seasons, there is low infection. Maximum sporulation occurs in the late hours of the night and early morning, typically at 2-3AM with high humidity and moisture or dew. The conidia are then spread via air currents or wind. Infection occurs most in the summer, peaking in July.

Transmission via seeds occurs with infection in the pericarp.

== Epidemiology ==
Philippine downy mildew can be found in China, India, Indonesia, Nepal, Pakistan, Thailand, and in the Philippines. Currently, there are no known cases of the disease occurring within the United States.

In Nepal, there was a large epidemic in 1967, followed by a couple more in 1970 and 1973. A large epidemic in the Philippines from 1974 to 1975 devastated the national agricultural maize crop, costing the country millions in yield.

There is limited information on diseases of P. philippinensis.

=== Diagnosis ===
Diagnosis as downy mildew can be characterized by the appearance of a down-like covering, the conidiophores, on the leaves, indicating a member of Peronosclerospora. To discriminate between species, a closer examination must be followed. Conidiophores of P. philippinensis are longer and thicken much less gradually for this disease than of other species of Peronosclerospora, and the conidia are also more elongated than the elliptical spores of P. sacchari. Spore size and shape are the most accurate method in differentiating between Peronosclerospora species.

=== Prevention ===
Drying seeds and limiting the amount of moisture that accumulates on seeds and plants is shown to control the development of the protist from infected seeds and young plants. The preemptive use of systemic protectant fungicides prevents the progression of P. philippinensis. Less sprayings in the dry season has proven to be more effective than more sprayings in the wet season. Also, combining mineral oil with fungicide reduces yield loss while still being cost effective. An alternative method would be to limit secondary hosts, such as grasses and weeds. There have been many attempts to develop identify genes that code for resistance and to breed strains for those genes. Studies show some progress, but the degree of gene dominance of the resistance and the inheritance is still questionable.

=== Treatment ===
The early application of fungicide to infected plants is the most common form of treatment. Using fungicides that are systemic, like Apron 35, which give protection within the plant, are the most reliable. These can be applied in the soil to the roots or as a spray to be taken up via transpiration. Other fungitoxicants, like Dithane M-45 and Dithane Z-78, are also effective. At high inoculation, the disease may be extended too systemically to be combatted.

== Human relevance ==
Corn is an important staple food for the world, especially for the Philippines, being the primary crop for 20% of the population. In the Philippine epidemic from 1974 to 1975, Philippine downy mildew cost the nation 8% of the total yield, accounting to 205,470 metric tons, or $22,601,700. Because of its high destruction and high percentages of infection, P. philippinensis threatens agriculture worldwide. Funding has been focused on studies to identifying the minimal effective use of fungicide. Other scientists have looked at inheritable resistance as a preventive effort or its effects on other crop exports, like sugarcane.

Until 2025, this disease was on the USDA APHIS Plant Pathogen Select Agent List, which included provisions for the USDA to treat the introduction of P. philippinensis into the country as an act of bioterrorism because of the possible effect it could have on natural flora and on national agriculture. Because of this status, there has been no budget for studies of this disease in the United States.

== Research ==
A number of experts on the disease are members of the U.S. Department of Agriculture or are of Texas A&M University. Much research has been put into the phylogenetic relationship between P. sacchari and P. philippinensis. Experiments have shown that of twenty-six species, only three species that can be infected by P. philippinensis show little infection by P. sacchari. This difference is minimalized when comparing host ranges of isolates of the same species. One isolate of P. philippinensis can infect seven more than another. There is no significant difference in the number of nuclei per spore for these two species, and they have almost identical banding patterns when analysed through a Southern blot. When looking at their genomes, using simple sequence repeats as markers, there is shown to be lack of uniqueness between P. philippinensis and P. sacchari. Because of these similarities, many scientists question that initial distinction that Weston placed on them in 1920.

More studies can be expected on a possible sexual stage as well as information on inherited resistance to P. philippinensis in the host plants.

The species can germinate in water and nutrient solutions, including those with 1% agar. In most experiments, isolates are extracted from the disease containment greenhouse or nursery. The conidia are collected by washing the spores from leaves, and then filtered through a screen. This solution is then sprayed onto the test plants which are incubated in dew chambers for six to seven hours at about 21 °C (70 °F) before they are moved to the laboratory.

== See also ==
- Chlorosis
- Metalaxyl
