= Marasmiellus stenophyllus =

Scientific classification
- Kingdom: Fungi
- Division: Basidiomycota
- Class: Agaricomycetes
- Order: Agaricales
- Family: Omphalotaceae
- Genus: Marasmiellus
- Species: M. stenophyllus

Binomial name
- Marasmiellus stenophyllus (Mont.) Singer, (1962)

Species of fungus

Marasmiellus stenophyllus is a plant pathogen that causes Marasmius sheath and shoot blight on sugarcane.
