= Puccinia kuehnii =

Scientific classification
- Domain: Eukaryota
- Kingdom: Fungi
- Division: Basidiomycota
- Class: Pucciniomycetes
- Order: Pucciniales
- Family: Pucciniaceae
- Genus: Puccinia
- Species: P. kuehnii

Binomial name
- Puccinia kuehnii (W. Krüger) E.J.Butler, (1914)

Synonyms
- Coeomurus kuehnii (W. Krüger) Kuntze, Revis. gen. pl. (Leipzig) 3(3): 450 (1898); Uredo kuehnii Wakker & Went, De Ziektan van het Suikerriet op Java: 144 (1898); Uromyces kuehnii W. Krüger, Ber. Versuchsstat. Zuckerrinhrin West-Java 1: 117 (1890)

Species of fungus

Puccinia kuehnii is a plant pathogen that causes orange rust disease of sugarcane. Orange rust was first discovered in India in 1914, but the first case of huge economical damage in sugarcane was registered in Australia in 2001. The first case in United States was in 2007 in Florida and has so far been the only state in the United States where sugarcane has been affected by this kind of rust. In order to treat the infected sugarcane at least three rounds of fungicide must be applied to the plant, costing growers $40 million a year. Currently scientists at the Agricultural Research Service are genetically analyzing the fungus that causes orange rust in order to help combat the problem.

== See also ==
- List of Puccinia species
