= Elsinoë sacchari =

Scientific classification
- Kingdom: Fungi
- Division: Ascomycota
- Class: Dothideomycetes
- Order: Myriangiales
- Family: Elsinoaceae
- Genus: Elsinoë
- Species: E. sacchari

Binomial name
- Elsinoë sacchari T.C. Lo (1964)

Synonyms
- Sphaceloma sacchari T.C. Lo (1957)

Pathogenic fungus

Elsinoe sacchari is the plant pathogen causing white rash of sugarcane. The anamorph (asexual) stage is Sphaceloma sacchari.

== Hosts ==
Hosts include sugarcane.
