= Phaeocytostroma sacchari =

Scientific classification
- Kingdom: Fungi
- Division: Ascomycota
- Class: Ascomycetes
- Order: incertae sedis
- Family: incertae sedis
- Genus: Phaeocytostroma
- Species: P. sacchari

Binomial name
- Phaeocytostroma sacchari (Ellis & Everh.) B. Sutton (1964)

Synonyms
- Coniothyrium sacchari S. Ahmad, Biologia, (1971); Melanconium sacchari Massee, (1896); Melanconium sacchari Lyon; Pleocyta sacchari (Massee) Petr. & Syd., (1927); Trullula sacchari Ellis & Everh., (1892)

Species of fungus

Phaeocytostroma sacchari is an ascomycete fungus that is a plant pathogen.
