= Clypeoporthe iliau =

Scientific classification
- Kingdom: Fungi
- Division: Ascomycota
- Class: Sordariomycetes
- Order: Diaporthales
- Family: Gnomoniaceae
- Genus: Clypeoporthe
- Species: C. iliau

Binomial name
- Clypeoporthe iliau (Lyon) M.E. Barr

Synonyms
- Gnomonia iliau Lyon; Melanconium iliau Lyon; Phaeocytostroma iliau (Lyon) Sivan.

Fungal disease of sugarcane

Clypeoporthe iliau is a plant pathogen.

== Hosts ==
Hosts include sugarcane (Saccharum spp.).
