= Phytoplasma sacchari =

Candidatus Phytoplasma sacchari

Scientific classification (Candidatus)
- Domain: Bacteria
- Kingdom: Bacillati
- Phylum: Mycoplasmatota
- Class: Mollicutes
- Order: Acholeplasmatales
- Family: Acholeplasmataceae
- Genus: Candidatus Phytoplasma
- Species: Ca. P. sacchari

Binomial name
- Candidatus Phytoplasma sacchari Kirdat et al 2021

Sugarcane grassy shoot disease

Candidatus Phytoplasma sacchari is a species of phytoplasma pathogen associated with sugarcane grassy shoot disease (SCGS). This SCGS phytoplasma belongs to the Rice Yellow Dwarf (RYD) group.
