= A. Hosahalli =

- village
- Location in Karnataka, India A. Hosahalli (India)
- Coordinates: 13.020907°N 77.022743°E
- Country: India
- State: Karnataka
- District: Tumkur
- Talukas: Kunigal

Government
  - Body: Village Panchayat

Languages
  - Official: Kannada
- Time zone: UTC+5:30 (IST)
- Nearest city: Tumkur
- Civic agency: Village Panchayat

A. Hosahalli is a village in the southern state of Karnataka, India. It is located in the Turuvekere taluk of Tumkur district in Karnataka.

== See also ==
- Tumakuru
- Districts of Karnataka
