= Dimeriella sacchari =

Scientific classification
- Kingdom: Fungi
- Division: Ascomycota
- Class: Dothideomycetes
- Order: incertae sedis
- Family: Parodiopsidaceae
- Genus: Dimeriella
- Species: D. sacchari

Binomial name
- Dimeriella sacchari (Breda de Haan) Hansf. ex E.V.Abbott (1964)

Synonyms
- Coleroa sacchari Breda de Haan (1892)

Species of fungus

Dimeriella sacchari is a species of fungus in the family Parodiopsidaceae. It is a plant pathogen that causes red leaf spot (also known as purple spot) on sugarcane.
