= Wakker =

Wakker is a surname. Notable people with the name include:

- Henri-Louis Wakker (1875–1972), Swiss banker and real estate entrepreneur
- Jan Hendrik Wakker (1859–1927), Dutch botanist and plant pathologist
- Wiebe Wakker, Dutch motorcar driver and world traveller
- Willem Wakker (1879–1959), Dutch long-distance runner

== See also ==
- Wakker Dier, Dutch animal welfare organisation
- Wakker Nederland or WNL, Dutch broadcasting association
- Wakker Prize, awarded annually by the Swiss Heritage Society
