= Cochliobolus hawaiiensis =

Scientific classification
- Domain: Eukaryota
- Kingdom: Fungi
- Division: Ascomycota
- Class: Dothideomycetes
- Order: Pleosporales
- Family: Pleosporaceae
- Genus: Cochliobolus
- Species: C. hawaiiensis

Binomial name
- Cochliobolus hawaiiensis Alcorn, (1978)

Synonyms
- Bipolaris hawaiiensis (M.B. Ellis) J.Y. Uchida & Aragaki, (1979); Drechslera hawaiiensis M.B. Ellis, (1971); Drechslera hawaiiensis (Bugnic.) Subram. & B.L. Jain [as 'hawaiiense'], (1966); Helminthosporium hawaiiense Bugnic., (1955); Pseudocochliobolus hawaiiensis (Alcorn) Tsuda & Ueyama, (1981)

Species of fungus

Cochliobolus hawaiiensis is a fungal plant pathogen.
