= Peronosclerospora miscanthi =

Scientific classification
- Domain: Eukaryota
- Clade: Sar
- Clade: Stramenopiles
- Phylum: Oomycota
- Class: Peronosporomycetes
- Order: Peronosporales
- Family: Peronosporaceae
- Genus: Peronosclerospora
- Species: P. miscanthi

Binomial name
- Peronosclerospora miscanthi (T. Miyake) C.G. Shaw, (1978)

Synonyms
- Sclerospora miscanthi

Species of plant pathogen

Peronosclerospora miscanthi is a plant pathogen infecting sugarcanes.
