= Peronosclerospora sacchari =

Scientific classification
- Domain: Eukaryota
- Clade: Sar
- Clade: Stramenopiles
- Division: Oomycota
- Class: Peronosporomycetes
- Order: Peronosporales
- Family: Peronosporaceae
- Genus: Peronosclerospora
- Species: P. sacchari

Binomial name
- Peronosclerospora sacchari (T. Miyake) C.G. Shaw, (1978)

Synonyms
- Sclerospora sacchari T. Miyake, (1912); Sclerospora sorghi-vulgaris Mundk., (1951)

Species of single-celled organism

Peronosclerospora sacchari is a plant pathogen, particularly for maize and sugarcane. It is closely related to Peronosclerospora philippinensis.
