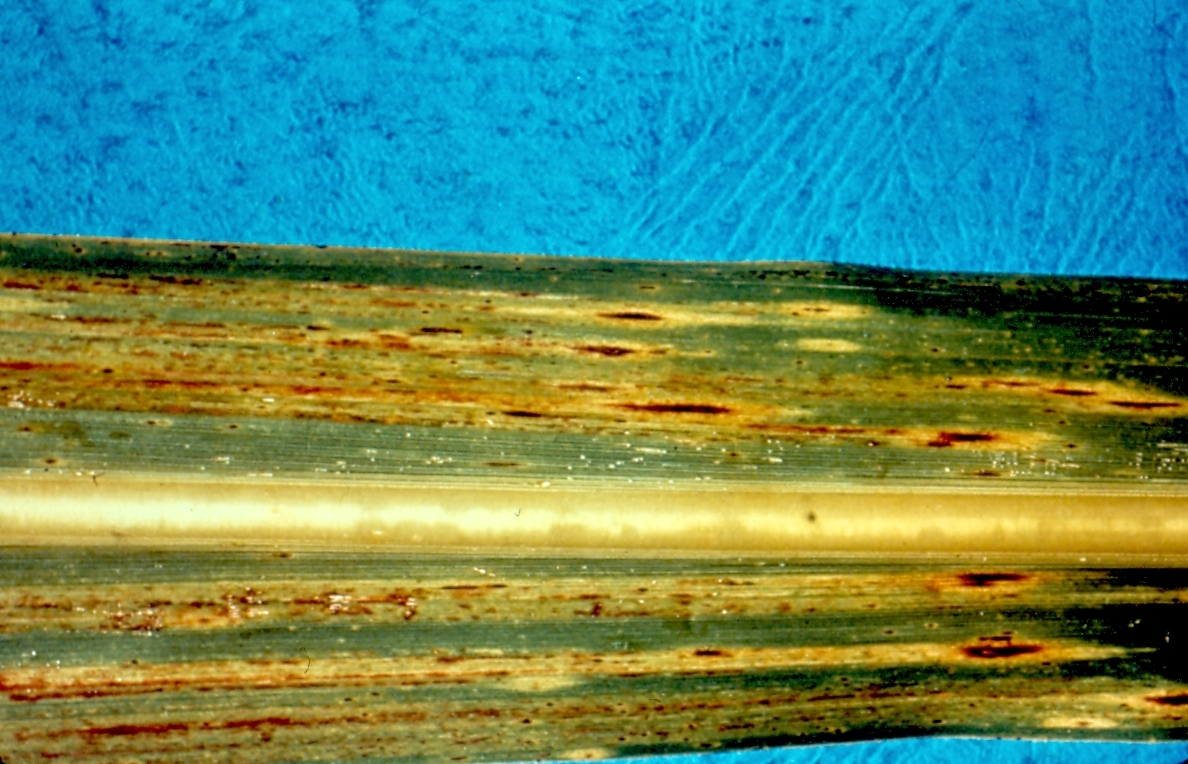
- Bipolaris sacchari on a sugarcane leaf

Scientific classification
- Kingdom: Fungi
- Division: Ascomycota
- Class: Dothideomycetes
- Order: Pleosporales
- Family: Pleosporaceae
- Genus: Bipolaris
- Species: B. sacchari

Binomial name
- Bipolaris sacchari (E.J. Butler) Shoemaker, (1959)

Synonyms
- Bipolaris sacchari (Breda de Haan) Subram., (1971); Cercospora sacchari Breda de Haan; Drechslera sacchari (E.J. Butler) Subram. & B.L. Jain, (1966); Helminthosporium sacchari E.J. Butler, (1913)

= Bipolaris sacchari =

Species of fungus

Bipolaris sacchari is a fungal plant pathogen in the family Pleosporaceae.

Bipolaris sacchari is an ascomycete fungal pathogen most notably affecting sugarcane. In its sexual stage, it produces spores housed in an ascus (a sac, usually with 8 spores inside). The spores are dispersed when the sac bursts. They spread to plant surfaces via wind and rain splashes, and if there is water present on the leaf, they may germinate and produce septate, walled hyphae on the surface of the leaf. These in turn asexually produce conidia that spread and further propagate the disease.

== Hosts ==
This pathogen affects sugarcane (Saccharum officinarum) and close relatives; a few members of Poaceae as well: citronella (Cymbopogan citratus), elephant grass (Pennisetum purpureum), pearl millet (Pennisetun glaucum) and barnyard grass (Echinochloa).

This fungus takes most of its economic notoriety for the yield losses sustained to sugarcane in commercial agriculture. Bipolaris sacchari produces host-specific toxins, namely oligosaccharide-sesquiterpene toxins that bind helminthosporoside. It is toxic because when within the substance of the plant, it reacts to create an abundance of nitrites. Different iterations of these toxins are specific to hosts; while sugarcane is the most economically significant, eye spot has been recorded on ferns in Florida, wheat in Iran, and banana in Brazil.

== Symptoms ==
Early in the progression of the disease, minute watery spots may be observed on plants. Crops that are six or more months old are more susceptible—younger leaves will most likely be affected first. As the disease progresses, reddish spots with yellow margins on leaves become visible. Extending from each spot are brownish streaks, called ‘runners’. These are thought to be caused by the spread of the toxin. Spots may merge as they increase in number and result in necrosis. Seedling blights may also occur.

== Management ==
Plant resistant varieties—most commercial varieties are already resistant, with no genetic modification. Q47 is one of these resistant varieties; conversely, varieties Q99 and Q101 are very susceptible.

Depending on severity, foliar applications of fungicide (2% copper oxychloride) may be used but are not practical because resistant varieties are common and garner just as much yield and quality.

In Mexico, a 33% yield loss was noted when a field of a susceptible variety having eye spot was compared with a field of a resistant variety. These losses can be avoided in large commercial agriculture by ensuring precision in management practices.

Over-fertilization is beneficial to the pathogen as it can use the excess nitrogen that the crop does not absorb.

== Environment ==
Bipolaris sacchari occurs all around the world. Because it is an ascomycete, it needs a film of water through which to continue disease progress. Temperate climates at elevation can encourage the conditions this pathogen finds favorable. Several days of heavy morning dew or rain may accelerate the disease progress. It likes moist, humid areas, and thrives with cooler night temperatures—these encourage production of the toxin.
