= List of maize diseases =

== Bacterial diseases ==
Bacterial diseases
Bacterial leaf blight and stalk rot	Pseudomonas avenae subsp. avenae
Bacterial leaf spot	Xanthomonas campestris pv. holcicola
Bacterial leaf streak of corn	Xanthomonas vasicola pv. vasculorum
Bacterial stalk rot	Enterobacter dissolvens = Erwinia dissolvens
Bacterial stalk and top rot	Erwinia carotovora subsp. carotovora Erwinia chrysanthemi pv. zeae
Bacterial stripe	Pseudomonas andropogonis
Chocolate spot	Pseudomonas syringae pv. coronafaciens
Goss's bacterial wilt and blight (leaf freckles and wilt)	Clavibacter michiganensis subsp. nebraskensis = Corynebacterium michiganense pv. nebraskense
Holcus spot	Pseudomonas syringae pv. syringae van Hall
Purple leaf sheath	Hemiparasitic bacteria
Seed rot-seedling blight	Bacillus subtilis
Stewart's disease (bacterial wilt)	Erwinia stewartii
Corn stunt (achapparramiento, maize stunt, Mesa Central or Rio Grande maize stunt)	Spiroplasma kunkelii

== Fungal diseases ==
Fungal diseases
Anthracnose leaf blight Anthracnose stalk rot Anthracnose top dieback	Colletotrichum graminicola Glomerella graminicola [teleomorph] Glomerella tucumanensis Glomerella falcatum [anamorph]
Aspergillus ear and kernel rot	Aspergillus flavus
Banded leaf and sheath spot	Rhizoctonia solani = Rhizoctonia microsclerotia Thanatephorus cucumeris [teleomorph]
Black bundle disease	Acremonium strictum = Cephalosporium acremonium
Black kernel rot	Lasiodiplodia theobromae = Botryodiplodia theobromae
Borde blanco	Marasmiellus sp.
Brown spot Black spot Stalk rot	Physoderma maydis
Cephalosporium kernel rot	Acremonium strictum = Cephalosporium acremonium
Charcoal rot	Macrophomina phaseolina
Corticium ear rot	Thanatephorus cucumeris = Corticium sasakii
Curvularia leaf spot	Curvularia clavata Curvularia eragrostidis = Curvularia maculans Cochliobolus eragrostidis [teleomorph] Curvularia inaequalis Curvularia intermedia Cochliobolus intermedius [teleomorph] Curvularia lunata Cochliobolus lunatus [teleomorph] Curvularia pallescens Cochliobolus pallescens [teleomorph] Curvularia senegalensis Curvularia tuberculata Cochliobolus tuberculatus [teleomorph]
Didymella leaf spot	Didymella exitalis
Diplodia ear rot and stalk rot	Diplodia frumenti Botryosphaeria festucae [teleomorph]
Diplodia ear rot Stalk rot Seed rot Seedling blight	Diplodia maydis
Diplodia leaf spot or leaf streak	Stenocarpella macrospora = Diplodia macrospora
Downy mildews
Brown stripe downy mildew	Sclerophthora rayssiae
Crazy top downy mildew	Sclerophthora macrospora = Sclerospora macrospora
Green ear downy mildew Graminicola downy mildew	Sclerospora graminicola
Java downy mildew	Peronosclerospora maydis = Sclerospora maydis
Philippine downy mildew	Peronosclerospora philippinensis = Sclerospora philippinensis
Sorghum downy mildew	Peronosclerospora sorghi = Sclerospora sorghi
Spontaneum downy mildew	Peronosclerospora spontanea = Sclerospora spontanea
Sugarcane downy mildew	Peronosclerospora sacchari = Sclerospora sacchari
...
Dry ear rot Cob, kernel and stalk rot	Nigrospora oryzae Khuskia oryzae [teleomorph]
Ear rots, minor	Alternaria alternata = Alternaria tenuis Aspergillus glaucus Aspergillus niger Aspergillus spp. Botrytis cinerea Botryotinia fuckeliana [teleomorph] Cunninghamella sp. Curvularia pallescens Doratomyces stemonitis = Cephalotrichum stemonitis Fusarium culmorum Gonatobotrys simplex Pithomyces maydicus Rhizopus microsporus Rhizopus stolonifer = Rhizopus nigricans Scopulariopsis brumptii
Ergot Horse's tooth	Claviceps gigantea Sphacelia sp. [anamorph]
Eyespot	Aureobasidium zeae = Kabatiella zeae
Fusarium ear and stalk rot	Fusarium subglutinans = Fusarium moniliforme
Fusarium kernel, root and stalk rot, seed rot and seedling blight	Fusarium moniliforme Gibberella fujikuroi [teleomorph]
Fusarium stalk rot Seedling root rot	Fusarium avenaceum Gibberella avenacea [teleomorph]
Gibberella ear and stalk rot	Gibberella zeae Fusarium graminearum [anamorph]
Gray ear rot	Botryosphaeria zeae = Physalospora zeae Macrophoma zeae [anamorph]
Corn grey leaf spot Gray leaf spot Cercospora leaf spot	Cercospora sorghi = Cercospora sorghi Cercospora zeae-maydis Cercospora zeina
Helminthosporium root rot	Exserohilum pedicellatum = Helminthosporium pedicellatum Setosphaeria pedicellata [teleomorph]
Hormodendrum ear rot Cladosporium ear rot	Cladosporium cladosporioides = Hormodendrum cladosporioides Cladosporium herbarum Mycosphaerella tassiana [teleomorph]
Hyalothyridium leaf spot	Hyalothyridium maydis
Late wilt	Cephalosporium maydis
Leaf spots, minor	Alternaria alternata Ascochyta maydis Ascochyta tritici Ascochyta zeicola Bipolaris victoriae = Helminthosporium victoriae Cochliobolus victoriae [teleomorph] Cochliobolus sativus Bipolaris sorokiniana [anamorph] = Helminthosporium sorokinianum = H. sativum Epicoccum nigrum Exserohilum prolatum = Drechslera prolata Setosphaeria prolata [teleomorph] Graphium penicillioides Leptosphaeria maydis Leptothyrium zeae Ophiosphaerella herpotricha Scolecosporiella sp. [anamorph] Paraphaeosphaeria michotii Phoma sp. Septoria zeae Septoria zeicola Septoria zeina
Northern corn leaf blight White blast Crown stalk rot Stripe	Setosphaeria turcica Exserohilum turcicum [anamorph] = Helminthosporium turcicum
Northern corn leaf spot Helminthosporium ear rot (race 1)	Cochliobolus carbonum Bipolaris zeicola [anamorph] = Helminthosporium carbonum
Penicillium ear rot Blue eye Blue mold	Penicillium spp. Penicillium chrysogenum Penicillium expansum Penicillium oxalicum
Phaeocytostroma stalk rot and root rot	Phaeocytostroma ambiguum = Phaeocytosporella zeae
Phaeosphaeria leaf spot	Phaeosphaeria maydis = Sphaerulina maydis
Physalospora ear rot Botryosphaeria ear rot	Botryosphaeria festucae = Physalospora zeicola Diplodia frumenti [anamorph]
Purple leaf sheath	Hemiparasitic bacteria and fungi
Pyrenochaeta stalk rot and root rot	Phoma terrestris = Pyrenochaeta terrestris
Pythium root rot	Pythium spp. Pythium arrhenomanes Pythium graminicola
Pythium stalk rot	Pythium aphanidermatum = Pythium butleri
Red kernel disease Ear mold, leaf and seed rot	Epicoccum nigrum
Rhizoctonia ear rot Sclerotial rot	Waitea zeae
Rhizoctonia root rot and stalk rot	Rhizoctonia solani Waitea zeae
Root rots, minor	Alternaria alternata Cercospora sorghi Dictochaeta fertilis Fusarium acuminatum Gibberella acuminata [teleomorph] Fusarium equiseti Gibberella intricans [teleomorph] Fusarium oxysporum Fusarium pallidoroseum Fusarium poae Fusarium roseum Gibberella cyanogena Fusarium sulphureum [anamorph] Microdochium bolleyi Mucor sp. Periconia circinata Phytophthora cactorum Phytophthora drechsleri Phytophthora nicotianae Rhizopus arrhizus
Rostratum leaf spot Helminthosporium leaf disease, ear and stalk rot	Setosphaeria rostrata = Helminthosporium rostratum
Rust, common corn	Puccinia sorghi
Rust, southern corn	Puccinia polysora
Rust, tropical corn	Physopella pallescens Physopella zeae = Angiopsora zeae
Sclerotium ear rot Southern blight	Athelia rolfsii
Seed rot-seedling blight	Athelia rolfsii Bipolaris sorokiniana Bipolaris zeicola = Helminthosporium carbonum Diplodia maydis Exserohilum pedicillatum Exserohilum turcicum = Helminthosporium turcicum Fusarium avenaceum Fusarium culmorum Fusarium moniliforme Gibberella zeae Fusarium graminearum [anamorph] Macrophomina phaseolina Penicillium spp. Phomopsis spp. Pythium spp. Rhizoctonia solani Spicaria spp. Waitea zeae
Selenophoma leaf spot	Selenophoma sp.
Sheath rot	Gaeumannomyces graminis
Shuck rot	Myrothecium gramineum
Silage mold	Monascus purpureus Monascus ruber
Smut, common	Ustilago zeae = Ustilago maydis
Smut, false	Ustilaginoidea virens
Smut, head	Sphacelotheca reiliana = Sporisorium holci-sorghi
Southern corn leaf blight and stalk rot	Cochliobolus heterostrophus Bipolaris maydis [anamorph] = Helminthosporium maydis
Southern leaf spot	Stenocarpella macrospora = Diplodia macrospora
Stalk rots, minor	Cercospora sorghi Fusarium episphaeria Fusarium merismoides Fusarium oxysporum Fusarium poae Fusarium roseum Fusarium solani Nectria haematococca [teleomorph] Fusarium tricinctum Mariannaea elegans Mucor spp. Rhopographus zeae Spicaria spp.
Storage rots	Aspergillus spp. Penicillium spp. and other fungi
Tar spot	Phyllachora maydis Monographella maydis Coniothyrium phyllachorae
Trichoderma ear rot and root rot	Trichoderma viride = Trichoderma lignorum Hypocrea sp. [teleomorph]
White ear rot, root and stalk rot	Stenocarpella maydis = Diplodia zeae
Yellow leaf blight	Ascochyta ischaemi Phyllosticta maydis Mycosphaerella zeae-maydis [teleomorph]
Zonate leaf spot	Gloeocercospora sorghi

== Nematodes, Parasitic ==
Nematodes, Parasitic
Awl	Dolichodorus spp. D. heterocephalus
Bulb and stem	Ditylenchus dipsaci
Burrowing	Radopholus similis
Cyst	Heterodera avenae H. zeae Punctodera chalcoensis
Dagger	Xiphinema spp. X. americanum X. mediterraneum
False root-knot	Nacobbus dorsalis
Lance, Columbia	Hoplolaimus columbus
Lance	Hoplolaimus spp. H. galeatus
Lesion	Pratylenchus spp. P. brachyurus P. crenatus P. hexincisus P. neglectus P. penetrans P. scribneri P. thornei P. zeae
Needle	Longidorus spp. L. breviannulatus
Ring	Criconemella spp. C. ornata
Root-knot	Meloidogyne spp. M. chitwoodi M. incognita M. javanica
Spiral	Helicotylenchus spp.
Sting	Belonolaimus spp. B. longicaudatus
Stubby-root	Paratrichodorus spp. P. christiei P. minor Quinisulcius acutus Trichodorus spp.
Stunt	Tylenchorhynchus dubius

== Virus and virus-like diseases ==
Virus and virus-like diseases
American wheat striate (wheat striate mosaic)	American wheat striate mosaic virus mosaic (AWSMV)
Barley stripe mosaic	Barley stripe mosaic virus (BSMV)
Barley yellow dwarf	Barley yellow dwarf virus (BYDV)
Brome mosaic	Brome mosaic virus (BMV)
Cereal chlorotic mottle	Cereal chlorotic mottle virus (CCMV)
Corn lethal necrosis (maize lethal necrosis disease)	Virus complex (Maize chlorotic mottle virus [MCMV] and Maize dwarf mosaic virus [MDMV] A or B or Wheat streak mosaic virus [WSMV])
Cucumber mosaic	Cucumber mosaic virus (CMV)
Johnsongrass mosaic	Johnsongrass mosaic virus (JGMV)
Maize bushy stunt	Mycoplasmalike organism (MLO), assoc.
Maize chlorotic dwarf	Maize chlorotic dwarf virus (MCDV)
Maize chlorotic mottle	Maize chlorotic mottle virus (MCMV)
Maize dwarf mosaic	Maize dwarf mosaic virus (MDMV) strains A, D, E and F
Maize leaf fleck	Maize leaf fleck virus (MLFV)
Maize line*	Maize line virus (MLV)
Maize mosaic (corn leaf stripe, enanismo rayado)	Maize mosaic virus (MMV)
Maize pellucid ringspot	Maize pellucid ringspot virus (MPRV)
Maize rayado fino (fine striping disease)	Maize rayado fino virus (MRFV)
Maize red leaf and red stripe	Mollicute?
Maize red stripe (now known as Wheat mosaic virus	Wheat mosaic virus (WMoV)
Maize ring mottle	Maize ring mottle virus (MRMV)
Maize rough dwarf (nanismo ruvido)	Maize rough dwarf virus (MRDV)
Maize sterile stunt	Maize sterile stunt virus (strains of barley yellow striate virus)
Maize streak	Maize streak virus (MSV)
Maize stripe (maize chlorotic stripe, maize hoja blanca)	Maize stripe virus
Maize tassel abortion	Maize tassel abortion virus (MTAV)
Maize vein enation	Maize vein enation virus (MVEV)
Maize wallaby ear	Maize wallaby ear virus (MWEV)
Maize white leaf	Maize white leaf virus
Maize white line mosaic	Maize white line mosaic virus (MWLMV)
Millet red leaf	Millet red leaf virus (MRLV)
Northern cereal mosaic	Northern cereal mosaic virus (NCMV)
Oat pseudorosette (zakuklivanie)	Oat pseudorosette virus
Oat sterile dwarf	Oat sterile dwarf virus (OSDV)
Rice black-streaked dwarf	Rice black-streaked dwarf virus (RBSDV)
Rice stripe	Rice stripe virus (RSV)
Sorghum mosaic	Sorghum mosaic virus (SrMV), formerly sugarcane mosaic virus (SCMV) strains H, I and M
Southern rice black-streaked dwarf	Southern rice black-streaked dwarf (SRBSDV)
Sugarcane Fiji disease	Sugarcane Fiji disease virus (FDV)
Sugarcane mosaic	Sugarcane mosaic virus (SCMV) strains A, B, D, E, SC, BC, Sabi and MB (formerly MDMV-B)
Wheat mosaic	Wheat mosaic virus (disambiguation) (WMoV)
