= List of Cercospora species =

This is a list of binomial names in the fungi genus Cercospora Fresen. ex Fuckel (1863) (in the family of Mycosphaerellaceae), with just accepted species and not including synonyms.

'Outline of Fungi and fungus-like taxa' by Wijayawardene et al. lists up to ca. 1125 species (in 2020), and around 755 records are listed (here) by Species Fungorum.

A list of over 1200 former Cercospora species is on the Species Fungorum site.

== A ==
- Cercospora abacula Munt.-Cvetk. (1960)
- Cercospora acaciae-mangii Crous, Pongpan. & M.J. Wingf. (2004)
- Cercospora acalyphae Peck (1883)
- Cercospora acanthacearum Govindu & Thirum. (1954)
- Cercospora acerigena U. Braun & Crous (2003)
- Cercospora achilleae (Jaap) U. Braun (1993)
- Cercospora actinidiae X.J. Liu & Y.L. Guo (1987)
- Cercospora adeniae J.M. Yen & Gilles (1975)
- Cercospora adenostemmatis Togashi & Katsuki (1952)
- Cercospora adhatodae S. Chowdhury (1955)
- Cercospora adianticola R.K. Srivast., A.K. Srivast. & Kamal (1995)
- Cercospora adiantigena U. Braun & Crous (2003)
- Cercospora adiniana R.K. Srivast., S. Narayan & A.K. Srivast. (1994)
- Cercospora aecidiicola Rao & M.A. Salam (1960)
- Cercospora aegles-marmelos R.S. Mathur, L.S. Chauhan & S.C. Verma (1965)
- Cercospora aeruae R.K. Srivast., Narayan & N. Kumari (2001)
- Cercospora aervae-lanatae Raghu Ram & Mallaiah (1996)
- Cercospora agavicola Ayala-Escobar (2005)
- Cercospora ageraticola Goh & W.H. Hsieh (1989)
- Cercospora agerati-conyzoidis Bagyan., Jagad. & U. Braun (1991)
- Cercospora alangii M. Mandal (1978)
- Cercospora albicans (Ellis & Everh.) U. Braun (1995)
- Cercospora albiziae A.K. Kar & M. Mandal (1969)
- Cercospora albiziicola Narayan, Kharwar & R.K. Singh (2001)
- Cercospora alchemillicola U. Braun & C.F. Hill (2002)
- Cercospora alismaticola Z.D. Jiang & P.K. Chi (1994)
- Cercospora alocasiae Sawada ex Goh & W.H. Hsieh (1987)
- Cercospora alphitoniae B. Huguenin (1966)
- Cercospora alpiniae-katsumadae S.Q. Chen & P.K. Chi (1990)
- Cercospora alpiniicola S.Q. Chen & P.K. Chi (1990)
- Cercospora alpiniigena To-anun, Meeboon & Hidayat (2014)
- Cercospora alstoniae Tak. Kobay. & E.D. Guzmán (1988)
- Cercospora althaeicola J.M. Yen & S.K. Sun (1983)
- Cercospora althaeina Sacc. (1878)
- Cercospora alysicarpi Munjal, Lall & Chona (1960)
- Cercospora amaryllidicola R.C. Rajak (1980)
- Cercospora amberboae Narain & B.S. Mehrotra (1971)
- Cercospora americana Vaghefi, S.J. Pethybridge & R.G. Shivas (2021)
- Cercospora amorphophallicola U. Braun (2001)
- Cercospora amphicarpaeae Togashi & Katsuki (1952)
- Cercospora anagallidis M.S. Patil (1979)
- Cercospora anaphalidis Munjal, Lall & Chona (1962)
- Cercospora anchomanes J.M. Yen & Gilles (1970)
- Cercospora anchomanicola J.M. Yen & Gilles (1975)
- Cercospora andrographidicola S.Q. Chen & P.K. Chi (1990)
- Cercospora andrographidis Thirum. & Govindu (1953)
- Cercospora angiopteridis Boedijn (1962)
- Cercospora anisochilicola G.P. Agarwal (1962)
- Cercospora annamalaiensis Rangaswami & Chandras. (1961)
- Cercospora antirrhini A.S. Mull. & Chupp (1950)
- Cercospora apii Fresen. (1863)
- Cercospora apiicola M. Groenew., Crous & U. Braun (2006)
- Cercospora apios Goh & W.H. Hsieh (1989)
- Cercospora aponogetonicola Pavgi & L. Singh (1977)
- Cercospora aracearum Firdousi, A.N. Rai & K.M. Vyas (1991)
- Cercospora arachidicola Hori (1917)
- Cercospora aragonensis Durrieu (1964)
- Cercospora ardisiae C.C. Chen (1968)
- Cercospora arecacearum Hidayat & Meeboon (2009)
- Cercospora ariminensis Cavara (1899)
- Cercospora aristidae Chupp (1954)
- Cercospora aristolochiae-contortae H.D. Shin & U. Braun (1996)
- Cercospora armoraciae Sacc. (1876)
- Cercospora arracacina Chupp (1954)
- Cercospora artemisiae Y.L. Guo & Y. Jiang (2000)
- Cercospora arthraxonis M.S. Patil & Sawant (1991)
- Cercospora asclepiadicola Chupp (1954)
- Cercospora asiatica R.K. Dubey, A.N. Rai, N.K. Verma & R.S. Thakur (2011)
- Cercospora asparagi Sacc. (1877)
- Cercospora aspera Pavgi & U.P. Singh (1964)
- Cercospora asperuginis Annal. (1978)
- Cercospora aspidospermatis Bat. & Peres (1960)
- Cercospora aspleniifoliae Narain & B.S. Mehrotra (1971)
- Cercospora asteracearum R.K. Srivast., A.K. Srivast. & Kamal (1995)
- Cercospora astragali Woron. (1927)
- Cercospora asystasiana J.M. Yen (1967)
- Cercospora atractylidis C.K. Pai & P.K. Chi (1965)
- Cercospora atylosigena Bhartiya, Narayan, A.N. Singh bis & N. Kumari (2003)
- Cercospora atylosiicola Bagyan., Jagad. & U. Braun (1991)
- Cercospora aucubae (Hara) Hara (1954)
- Cercospora aurantia Heald & F.A. Wolf (1911)
- Cercospora avicennae Chupp (1954)

== B ==
- Cercospora balaghatensis S.M. Singh (1977)
- Cercospora baliospermi Pavgi & U.P. Singh (1965)
- Cercospora balsaminiana J.M. Yen & Lim (1970)
- Cercospora barleriae-cristatae Govindu & Thirum. (1957)
- Cercospora barleriicola Payak & Thirum. (1950)
- Cercospora baroipurensis Purkay. & Mallik (1979)
- Cercospora barretoana (U. Braun & Crous) U. Braun & Crous (2015)
- Cercospora barringtoniae (Syd. & P. Syd.) Chupp (1953)
- Cercospora basellae-albae R.K. Srivast., S. Narayan & A.K. Srivast. (1994)
- Cercospora bauhiniae-variegatae R.C. Rajak (1982)
- Cercospora beninensis Y. Meswaet, Mangelsdorff, Yorou & M. Piepenbr. (2021)
- Cercospora berteroae Hollós (1907)
- Cercospora bertrandii Chupp (1954)
- Cercospora beticola Sacc. (1876)
- Cercospora bidentis Tharp (1917)
- Cercospora bidentis-biternatae Pavgi & U.P. Singh (1966)
- Cercospora biharica Thirum. & Govindu (1954)
- Cercospora bixicola Narayan, Kharwar & R.K. Singh (2001)
- Cercospora bizzozeriana Sacc. & Berl. (1888)
- Cercospora blainvilleae Govindu & Thirum. (1955)
- Cercospora blepharidicola U. Braun (2015)
- Cercospora blumeae-oxydontae Pavgi & R.A. Singh (1971)
- Cercospora blumeicola S. Das (1958)
- Cercospora boerhaviicola Thirum. & Govindu (1953)
- Cercospora bombacicola Munjal, Lall & Chona (1961)
- Cercospora bombacis Goh & W.H. Hsieh (1987)
- Cercospora borreriae-strictae Bagyan., Jagad. & U. Braun (1991)
- Cercospora boswelliae Harsch, V. Nath, C.K. Tiwari & Rehill (1989)
- Cercospora bothriochloae U. Braun & Crous (2005)
- Cercospora brachiata Ellis & Everh. (1888)
- Cercospora brassicicola Henn. (1905)
- Cercospora broussonetiicola Y.L. Guo & Li Xu (2002)
- Cercospora browalliae Chupp & Barrus (1954)
- Cercospora brunfelsiicola Hidayat & Meeboon (2014)
- Cercospora bryoniae T.M. Achundov (1970)
- Cercospora bunii Annal. (1978)
- Cercospora burserae Govindu & Thirum. (1965)
- Cercospora buteae Munjal, Lall & Chona (1960)

== C ==
- Cercospora cacaliae Y.L. Guo & Y. Jiang (2001)
- Cercospora caenophana Munt.-Cvetk. (1957)
- Cercospora caesalpiniae G.P. Agarwal & N.D. Sharma (1973)
- Cercospora caladii Cooke (1880)
- Cercospora calaminthae Chupp (1954)
- Cercospora caleifolii Bat., H.P. Upadhyay & J.P. Costa (1966)
- Cercospora calendulae Sacc. (1878)
- Cercospora calendulicola Narayan, Kharwar & R.K. Singh (2001)
- Cercospora californiensis Chupp (1954)
- Cercospora callicarpicola Sawada (1943)
- Cercospora camelinae Annal. (1978)
- Cercospora campanulae Chupp (1954)
- Cercospora canavaliae-gladiatae J.M. Yen & Lim (1982)
- Cercospora canavaliana J.M. Yen & Lim (1970)
- Cercospora canavaliicola Sawada & Katsuki (1959)
- Cercospora canescens Ellis & G. Martin (1882)
- Cercospora cannae C.K. Bai, X.J. Liu & Y.L. Guo (1984)
- Cercospora cantonensis P.K. Chi (1994)
- Cercospora capsici Heald & F.A. Wolf (1911)
- Cercospora capsicigena Bhartiya, R. Dubey & S.K. Singh (2000)
- Cercospora carbonacea Miles (1917)
- Cercospora cardamines Losa (1945)
- Cercospora caricae-papayae P.K. Rajak & S.P. Gautam (1978)
- Cercospora caricigena Bhartiya, A.N. Singh bis, N. Kumari & P.N. Singh (1998)
- Cercospora carissae Harsch, V. Nath, C.K. Tiwari & Rehill (1989)
- Cercospora carthami Sundaram & T.S. Ramakr. (1928)
- Cercospora caryopteridis R.S. Mathur, L.S. Chauhan & S.C. Verma (1965)
- Cercospora cassiae-montanae Govindu & Thirum. (1954)
- Cercospora cassiae-nodosae J.M. Yen (1979)
- Cercospora cassiatorae R.C. Rajak (1985)
- Cercospora castillae vSawada ex Goh & W.H. Hsieh (1987)
- Cercospora catharanthi Karan & Manohar. (1978)
- Cercospora cedrelae S. Chowdhury (1961)
- Cercospora celastricola Govindu & Thirum. (1954)
- Cercospora celosiae Syd. (1929)
- Cercospora celosiicola Bhartiya, Narayan, A.N. Singh bis & N. Kumari (2003)
- Cercospora celosiigena U. Braun & Bagyan. (2015)
- Cercospora centellae Manohar., Kunwar & Sharath (2003)
- Cercospora cephalantherae Ondřej & Zavřel (1971)
- Cercospora cephalariae Rayss (1950)
- Cercospora cercosporelloides Deighton (1973)
- Cercospora cestri-parqui Lall & H.S. Gill (1963)
- Cercospora chaae Hara ex W. Yamam. & Maeda (1960)
- Cercospora cheilanthis Chowdhry, D. Gupta & Padhi (1983)
- Cercospora cheiranthi Sacc. (1876)
- Cercospora chelidonii Y.L. Guo & Li Xu (2002)
- Cercospora christellae Hidayat & Meeboon (2010)
- Cercospora chrozophorina Raghv. Singh, Sh. Kumar, V.K. Pal, Upadhyaya & D.K. Agarwal (2007)
- Cercospora chrysanthemi Heald & F.A. Wolf (1911)
- Cercospora chrysanthemoidis Crous & W.J. Swart (2012)
- Cercospora chusqueae Chupp (1954)
- Cercospora cimicifugae C.K. Pai & P.K. Chi (1965)
- Cercospora cinchonicoea Boedijn (1962)
- Cercospora cinerae Pavgi & U.P. Singh (1964)
- Cercospora cipadessae Govindu & Thirum. (1954)
- Cercospora cistinearum Sacc. (1878)
- Cercospora clavigera Ellis & Everh. ex Chupp (1954)
- Cercospora clinopodii-vulgaris Savinceva (1973)
- Cercospora cocciniae Munjal, Lall & Chona (1959)
- Cercospora cocculi-hirsuti R.K. Srivast., S. Narayan & A.K. Srivast. (1994)
- Cercospora codonopsidis Nelen (1966)
- Cercospora coffeae-olivaceae Narayan, Kharwar & R.K. Singh (2001)
- Cercospora coicicola Kamal (2010)
- Cercospora coicis N.D. Sharma & R.P. Mishra (1977)
- Cercospora coleana J.M. Yen & Lim (1969)
- Cercospora colei Boedijn (1962)
- Cercospora coleicola Chupp & A.S. Mull. (1954)
- Cercospora colocasigena S. Narayan, Kharwar, R.K. Singh & Bhartiya (1998)
- Cercospora comari Peck (1885)
- Cercospora combreti-ovalifolii Patw. & Sathe (1966)
- Cercospora commelinae-salicifoliae A.K. Kar & M. Mandal (1974)
- Cercospora commelinicola Chupp ex U. Braun (1999)
- Cercospora coniogrammes Crous & R.G. Shivas (2012)
- Cercospora convolvulicola Bakhshi, Arzanlou, Babai-ahari, Crous & U. Braun (2014)
- Cercospora conyzae-canadensis Bakhshi, Arzanlou, Babai-ahari, Crous & U. Braun (2014)
- Cercospora conyzicola L.L. Duarte & R.W. Barreto (2016)
- Cercospora conyzoidis Thirum. & Govindu (1957)
- Cercospora crataegi Sacc. & C. Massal. (1906)
- Cercospora crepidis Ondřej & Zavřel (1971)
- Cercospora crinicola R.K. Srivast., N. Srivast. & A.K. Srivast. (1994)
- Cercospora crossandrae Jagan., Palan. & Narayanas. (1972)
- Cercospora cryptocoryneae Chidd. (1962)
- Cercospora cryptocorynes Chidd. (1962)
- Cercospora curcumae Govindu & Thirum. (1957)
- Cercospora curcumina R.K. Srivast., N. Srivast. & A.K. Srivast. (1994)
- Cercospora cyathoclines M.S. Patil (1978)
- Cercospora cyclosori Goh & W.H. Hsieh (1989)
- Cercospora cylindracea Bakhshi, Arzanlou, Babai-ahari, Crous & U. Braun (2014)
- Cercospora cymbopogonicola U. Braun (2015)
- Cercospora cymbopogonis J.M. Yen (1977)
- Cercospora cynarae Y.L. Guo & Y. Jiang (2001)
- Cercospora cynodontis Pavgi & R.A. Singh (1971)
- Cercospora cyperacearum Cheew., Crous & U. Braun (2015)
- Cercospora cypericola Chupp & H.C. Greene (1953)
- Cercospora cyperi-fusci Sandu (1960)
- Cercospora cyperigena U. Braun & Crous (2003)
- Cercospora cyperina Nguanhom, Crous & U. Braun (2015)
- Cercospora cyperi-rotundi Thirum. & Govindu (1953)
- Cercospora cytisi Chupp (1954)

== D ==
- Cercospora daemiicola A.K. Kar & M. Mandal (1974)
- Cercospora dahliicola M.A. Salam & P.N. Rao (1957)
- Cercospora daidai Hara (1954)
- Cercospora dalbergiigena R.K. Srivast., S. Narayan & A.K. Srivast. (1995)
- Cercospora dapoliana Garud (1971)
- Cercospora datiscicola Esfand. (1951)
- Cercospora deightonii Chupp (1954)
- Cercospora delaireae C. Nakash., Crous, U. Braun & H.D. Shin (2012)
- Cercospora dendrobii H.C. Burnett (1965)
- Cercospora deutziae Ellis & Everh. (1888)
- Cercospora dianellicola Crous (2017)
- Cercospora dichondrae Katsuki (1955)
- Cercospora digitalis P.K. Chi & C.K. Pai (1966)
- Cercospora digitariae J. Kranz (1966)
- Cercospora dioscoreae-bulbiferae J.M. Yen & Gilles (1971)
- Cercospora dioscoreae-pyrifoliae J.M. Yen (1968)
- Cercospora diospyricola Munjal, Lall & Chona (1962)
- Cercospora diplaziicola A.K. Das (1989)
- Cercospora dodonaeae R.K. Srivast., N. Srivast. & A.K. Srivast. (1994)
- Cercospora donnell-smithii (Speg.) Chupp (1954)
- Cercospora dontostemonicola Nelen (1966)
- Cercospora drymariae Katsuki (1955)
- Cercospora dryopteridis Y.L. Guo (1997)
- Cercospora duddiae Welles (1923)
- Cercospora duranticola Phengs., Chukeat., McKenzie, K.D. Hyde & U. Braun (2013)

== E ==
- Cercospora echii G. Winter (1884)
- Cercospora echinodori Chupp (1954)
- Cercospora ecliptae Chupp (1954)
- Cercospora edgeworthiicola Li Xu & Y.L. Guo (2003)
- Cercospora ehretiicola A. Saleem & Mirza (1977)
- Cercospora elaeagni Heald & F.A. Wolf (1911)
- Cercospora eleusines Munjal, Lall & Chona (1962)
- Cercospora elongata Peck (1883)
- Cercospora emodi Pandotra & K.S.M. Sastry (1969)
- Cercospora epilasiae Annal. (1978)
- Cercospora eragrostidis McKenzie & Latch (1984)
- Cercospora eremochloae R.G. Shivas & A.J. Young (2011)
- Cercospora erigeronicola U. Braun & Rogerson (1993)
- Cercospora erysimi Davis (1915)
- Cercospora erythrinae Ellis & Everh. (1887)
- Cercospora erythrinae-lithospermae Agnihothr. (1966)
- Cercospora erythrinicola Tharp (1917)
- Cercospora eucalyptorum Crous (1998)
- Cercospora euclidii Golovin (1950)
- Cercospora eucommiae Crous, U. Braun & H.D. Shin (2012)
- Cercospora eulophiae M.S. Patil (1979)
- Cercospora euodiae-rutaecarpae S.Q. Chen & P.K. Chi (1990)
- Cercospora euonymigena Y.L. Guo & Y. Jiang (2000)
- Cercospora eupatorii-fortunei P.K. Chi & Z.D. Jiang (1994)
- Cercospora euphorbiae-sieboldianae C. Nakash., Crous, U. Braun & H.D. Shin (2012)
- Cercospora euphrasiae Ondřej (1969)
- Cercospora eupteleae Togashi & Katsuki (1952)
- Cercospora europaea (Gonz. Frag.) Constant. (1967)
- Cercospora exochordicola U. Braun & Bulgakov (2009)
- Cercospora exosporioides Bubák (1915)
- Cercospora extensa Siboe, P.F. Cannon & P.M. Kirk (2000)

== F ==
- Cercospora farsetiana I.D. Singh (1978)
- Cercospora ferulae Annal. (1975)
- Cercospora festucae Hardison (1945)
- Cercospora ficariae Bukhalo (1963)
- Cercospora firmianae Narayan, Kharwar & R.K. Singh (2001)
- Cercospora flacourtiicola P.C. Gupta (1973)
- Cercospora fleuryae Thirum. & Govindu (1953)
- Cercospora furfurella Speg. (1888)
- Cercospora fusca F.V. Rand (1914)

== G ==
- Cercospora gaillardiae Chidd. (1960)
- Cercospora gamsiana M. Bakhshi & Crous (2018)
- Cercospora gangetica Pavgi & U.P. Singh (1964)
- Cercospora ganjetica Purkay. & Mallik (1978)
- Cercospora garugae G.P. Agarwal & Hasija (1966)
- Cercospora garugaicola Narayan, Kharwar & R.K. Singh (2001)
- Cercospora geniculata A.K. Das (1989)
- Cercospora geraisensis Chupp (1954)
- Cercospora gerberae Chupp & Viégas (1945)
- Cercospora gigantea F.E. Fisher (1961)
- Cercospora glauciana Viégas (1945)
- Cercospora gloriosicola J.M. Yen & Lim (1969)
- Cercospora gloxiniae Chupp (1954)
- Cercospora glycinicola Cheew., Crous & U. Braun (2015)
- Cercospora glycyrrhizae-echinatae (Săvul. & Sandu) U. Braun & Crous (2003)
- Cercospora golaghati Saikia & A.K. Sarbhoy (1980)
- Cercospora gomphrenigena Crous (2019)
- Cercospora gorakhanathii A.N. Rai & Kamal (1987)
- Cercospora gorakhpurensis Bhartiya, A.N. Singh bis, N. Kumari & P.N. Singh (1998)
- Cercospora gossypii Lall, H.S. Gill & Munjal (1962)
- Cercospora gossypiicola Narayan, Kharwar & R.K. Singh (2001)
- Cercospora granadillae Chupp (1954)
- Cercospora graphioides Ellis ex Chupp (1954)
- Cercospora guatemalensis A.S. Mull. & Chupp (1950)
- Cercospora guillardiae Chidd. (1960)
- Cercospora guineensis J. Kranz (1966)
- Cercospora guizotiicola Govindu & Thirum. (1957)
- Cercospora gundeliae Annal. (1978)
- Cercospora gynandropsidicola R.K. Srivast., A.K. Srivast. & Kamal (1995)

== H ==
- Cercospora habenariicola Meeboon, Hidayat & C. Nakash. (2007)
- Cercospora haematoxyli Chupp (1954)
- Cercospora haleniae Chupp & Bisby ex U. Braun, D.F. Farr & Minnis (2009)
- Cercospora hamiltoniae Munjal, Lall & Chona (1962)
- Cercospora handroanthus U. Braun & Urtiaga (2012)
- Cercospora hawaiiensis Vaghefi, S.C. Nelson, S.J. Pethybridge & R.G. Shivas (2021)
- Cercospora hayi Calp. (1955)
- Cercospora hebbalensis Govindu, Thirum. & Nag Raj (1971)
- Cercospora hederae Togashi & Katsuki (1952)
- Cercospora hedericola (Heald & F.A. Wolf) U. Braun (1993)
- Cercospora helianthicola Chupp & Viégas (1945)
- Cercospora helichrysi Chupp (1954)
- Cercospora heliconiae Chowdhry, D. Gupta & Padhi (1983)
- Cercospora heliotropiicola A.K. Kar & M. Mandal (1970)
- Cercospora heraclei N.P. Golovina (1964)
- Cercospora herniariae U. Braun & V. Kumm. (2015)
- Cercospora heterophragmatis M.S. Patil (1975)
- Cercospora heylandiae M.S. Patil (1976)
- Cercospora hitcheniae Chidd. (1960)
- Cercospora holmskioldiae Lall & H.S. Gill (1963)
- Cercospora holopteleae-integrifoliae S. Narayan, H.S.G. Rao & H.D. Bhartiya (2000)
- Cercospora hosackiae Chupp (1954)
- Cercospora hostae Hori ex Katsuki (1955)
- Cercospora houttuyniicola Goh & W.H. Hsieh (1989)
- Cercospora hoveae Hansf. (1957)
- Cercospora humilis Pavgi & U.P. Singh (1965)
- Cercospora humuligena Y.L. Guo & Li Xu (2002)
- Cercospora huricola Chupp (1954)
- Cercospora hydrangeae Ellis & Everh. (1892)
- Cercospora hydroleae Thirum. & Govindu (1953)
- Cercospora hygrophilae Ponnappa (1968)
- Cercospora hyptidicola R.K. Srivast., N. Srivast. & A.K. Srivast. (1994)

== I ==
- Cercospora ilicis-opacae Chupp (1954)
- Cercospora imperatoriae Baudyš & Picb. (1924)
- Cercospora indigoferae Ragunathan & K. Ramakr. (1965)
- Cercospora ingigena R.K. Srivast., S. Narayan & A.K. Srivast. (1995)
- Cercospora insulana Sacc. (1915)
- Cercospora iphigeniae Patw. & Sathe (1966)
- Cercospora ipomoeae-illustris Chidd. (1960)
- Cercospora ipomoeae-pedis-caprae J.M. Yen & Lim (1971)
- Cercospora iranica Bakhshi, Arzanlou, Babai-ahari, Crous & U. Braun (2014)
- Cercospora iridis Chupp (1954)
- Cercospora ischaemi R.G. Shivas, Marney & McTaggart (2014)
- Cercospora isoplexidis Jørst. (1962)
- Cercospora italica Curzi (1932)
- Cercospora ithacensis Chupp (1954)

== J ==
- Cercospora jacobiniicola A.S. Mull. & Chupp (1950)
- Cercospora jagdalpurensis P.K. Rajak & S.P. Gautam (1978)
- Cercospora jamuensis Pandotra (1972)
- Cercospora jasmini Narayan, Kharwar & R.K. Singh (2001)
- Cercospora jatrophicola (Speg.) Chupp (1954)
- Cercospora jatrophigena U. Braun (2001)
- Cercospora jatrophiphila A.C. Dianese & Dianese (2014)
- Cercospora juncicola (Kasai) Vassiljevsky (1937)
- Cercospora junci-filiformis Melnik (1966)
- Cercospora junci-marginati U. Braun (1993)
- Cercospora justiciae-adhatodae U. Braun (2015)
- Cercospora justiciigena U. Braun (2015)

== K ==
- Cercospora kakiivora Hara ex W. Yamam. & Maeda (1991)
- Cercospora kalanchoes Boedijn (1962)
- Cercospora kamatensis Chidd. (1960)
- Cercospora kanpurensis L.S. Chauhan & Z.U. Ahmed (1970)
- Cercospora kashiensis Bharadwaj (1971)
- Cercospora kickxiae Firdousi, A.N. Rai & K.M. Vyas (1994)
- Cercospora kigeliae Lall & H.S. Gill (1963)
- Cercospora kikuchii (Tak. Matsumoto & Tomoy.) M.W. Gardner (1927)
- Cercospora kirganeliicola R.K. Srivast., S. Narayan & A.K. Srivast. (1995)
- Cercospora knoxiae Govindu & Thirum. (1955)
- Cercospora koroviniae Annal. (1978)
- Cercospora krugiana A.S. Mull. & Chupp (1936)
- Cercospora kuznetzoviana Tartenova (1975)
- Cercospora kyllingae J.M. Yen & Gilles (1970)
- Cercospora kyllingicola J.M. Yen & Gilles (1970)
- Cercospora kyotensis M. Yoshik. & T. Yokoy. (1992)

== L ==
- Cercospora labiatacearum P. Kumar & Kamal (1981)
- Cercospora labiatarum Chupp & A.S. Mull. (1954)
- Cercospora lagenariae M.A. Salam & P.N. Rao (1957)
- Cercospora lagerstroemiae-speciosae R.K. Srivast., S. Narayan & A.K. Srivast. (1995)
- Cercospora lambareneensis J.M. Yen (1971)
- Cercospora lanneae A.K. Kar & M. Mandal (1969)
- Cercospora lantanae-aculeatae J.M. Yen (1966)
- Cercospora lantanae-camarae J.M. Yen & Gilles (1971)
- Cercospora lantanae-indicae Munjal, Lall & Chona (1960)
- Cercospora laporticola Sarbajna & Chattopadh. (1990)
- Cercospora lasianthi C.C. Chen (1967)
- Cercospora lasianthicola C.C. Chen (1967)
- Cercospora launaeae-aspleniifoliae A.K. Kar & M. Mandal (1970)
- Cercospora launaeicola S.A. Khan & M. Kamal (1974)
- Cercospora lawsoniae-albae Thirum. & Govindu (1963)
- Cercospora lecanthi M.S. Patil (1979)
- Cercospora leeae-aecidiicola Karan & Manohar. (1978)
- Cercospora lentis N.D. Sharma, R.P. Mishra & A.C. Jain (1978)
- Cercospora lepidagathidis Govindu & Thirum. (1955)
- Cercospora leptadeniana U. Braun, Bagyan. & Jagad. (1992)
- Cercospora leucadis Thirum. & Govindu (1953)
- Cercospora leucaenae A.N. Shukla & Sarmah (1984)
- Cercospora leucaenae-leucocephalae Raghu Ram & Mallaiah (1993)
- Cercospora lhuillieri Montegut (1967)
- Cercospora limnobii Conway (1979)
- Cercospora lindericola W. Yamam. (1934)
- Cercospora linicola Pavgi & Rathaiah (1971)
- Cercospora lippiae Ellis & Everh. (1887)
- Cercospora litseae-laetae T.K. Jana, S.N. Ghosh & A.K. Das (2006)
- Cercospora longipes E.J. Butler (1906)
- Cercospora longispora Peck (1884)
- Cercospora loti Hollós (1907)
- Cercospora lotononidis Crous & B. Sutton (1997)
- Cercospora ludwigiana Bagyan., U. Braun & Jagad. (1995)
- Cercospora luffae Hara (1929)
- Cercospora lychnidis H.C. Greene (1959)
- Cercospora lycopersicicola Bhartiya, R. Dubey & S.K. Singh (2000)
- Cercospora lygodiicola Lall, J.N. Kapoor & Munjal (1964)

== M ==
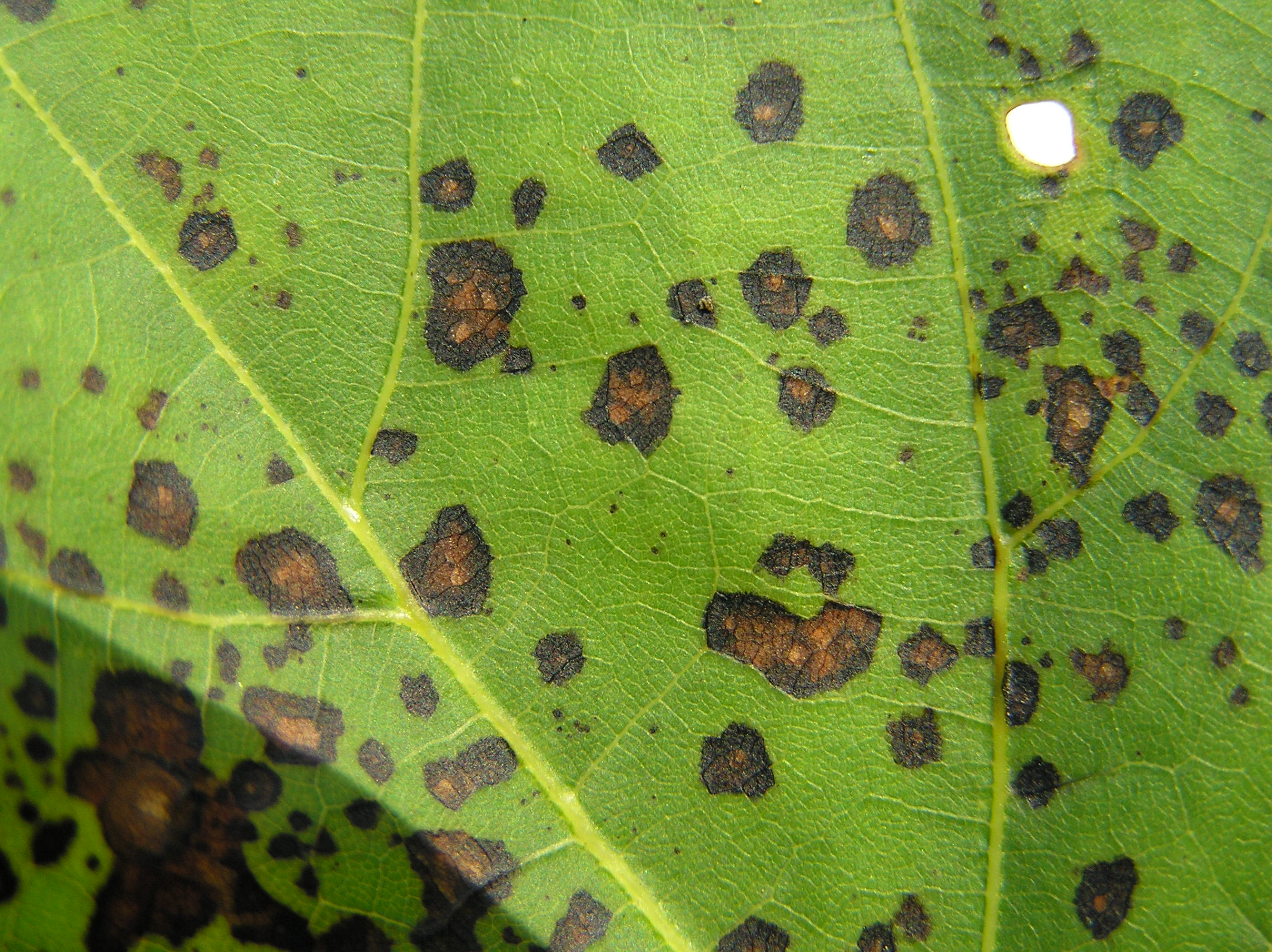
Cercospora microsorii on leaf of Tilia cordata in Poland

- Cercospora maculicola Thirum. & Govindu (1954)
- Cercospora madhauliensis Kamal, B.K. Gupta & R.K. Verma (1987)
- Cercospora maianthemi Fuckel (1866)
- Cercospora malayensis F. Stevens & Solheim (1931)
- Cercospora malvacearum Chidd. (1960)
- Cercospora malvarum Sacc. (1881)
- Cercospora malvicola Ellis & G. Martin (1882)
- Cercospora mandira S. Chowdhury (1958)
- Cercospora manevalii Chupp (1954)
- Cercospora mangiferae-indicae Munjal, Lall & Chona (1962)
- Cercospora manihobae Viégas (1945)
- Cercospora manoa Vaghefi, S.C. Nelson, S.J. Pethybridge & R.G. Shivas (2021)
- Cercospora marsileae Ragunathan, Prasad & Purushoth. (1970)
- Cercospora martyniicola R.K. Chaudhary, S. Narayan, U.C. Upadhyay & G.P. Rao (1995)
- Cercospora mataybae Bat. & Peres (1962)
- Cercospora maughaniicola Bhartiya, Narayan, A.N. Singh bis & N. Kumari (2003)
- Cercospora medicaginis Ellis & Everh. (1891)
- Cercospora megaspermae L.N. Bhardwaj & R.C. Sharma (1994)
- Cercospora mehran S.A. Khan & M. Kamal (1974)
- Cercospora melampyri Nelen (1966)
- Cercospora meliae Ellis & Everh. (1887)
- Cercospora melicocci Tak. Kobay. (1984)
- Cercospora meliosmae Y.L. Guo & Li Xu (2004)
- Cercospora melongenae Welles (1922)
- Cercospora mercurialis Pass. (1877)
- Cercospora microlaenae McKenzie & Latch (1984)
- Cercospora microsorii P. Kumar & Kamal (1981)
- Cercospora mikaniae-cordatae .M. Yen (1965)
- Cercospora mikaniicola F. Stevens (1917)
- Cercospora mimosae G.P. Agarwal & N.D. Sharma (1973)
- Cercospora mimosae-sensitivae A. Hern.-Gut. & Dianese (2009)
- Cercospora minutipes J.M. Yen (1966)
- Cercospora miscanthi Sawada ex Goh & W.H. Hsieh (1987)
- Cercospora mitracarpi-hirti O.L. Pereira & R.W. Barreto (2005)
- Cercospora modiolae Tharp (1917)
- Cercospora molucellae Bremer & Petr. (1947)
- Cercospora monsterae Narayan, Kharwar & R.K. Singh (2001)
- Cercospora moracearum A.N. Rai & Kamal (1987)
- Cercospora moravica (Petr.) U. Braun (1993)
- Cercospora moricola Cooke (1884)
- Cercospora morina Chupp (1954)
- Cercospora morindina Pavgi & U.P. Singh (1966)
- Cercospora muelleriana U. Braun & Crous (2003)
- Cercospora musigena Nguanhom, Crous & U. Braun (2015)
- Cercospora myrtacearum S. Narayan, R.N. Kharwar, R.K. Singh & H.S.G. Rao (2001)
- Cercospora myrti Erikss. (1885)

== N ==
- Cercospora narthecii Balf.-Browne (1951)
- Cercospora nasturtii Pass. (1877)
- Cercospora neobougainvilleae Meeboon, Hidayat & C. Nakash. (2008)
- Cercospora neomaricae D.M. Macedo & R.W. Barreto (2014)
- Cercospora neosphaeranthi Bhartiya, A.N. Singh bis, N. Kumari & P.N. Singh (1998)
- Cercospora neriicola Ershad (2002)
- Cercospora nicandrae Chupp (1954)
- Cercospora nicotianae Ellis & Everh. (1893)
- Cercospora nicotianicola J.M. Yen (1967)
- Cercospora nigellae Hollós (1910)
- Cercospora nigri Tharp (1917)
- Cercospora nilghirensis Govindu & Thirum. (1955)
- Cercospora nothosaervae M.S. Patil (1975)
- Cercospora nucifera R.K. Srivast., S. Narayan & A.K. Srivast. (1995)
- Cercospora nudiflorae Chupp (1954)
- Cercospora nyssae-sylvaticae H.C. Greene (1960)

== O ==
- Cercospora ochromae A. Hern.-Gut. & Dianese (2009)
- Cercospora ocimigena R.K. Srivast., Narayan & N. Kumari (2001)
- Cercospora odontitis Pisareva (1964)
- Cercospora oedibasidis Byzova (1975)
- Cercospora oldenlandiicola Govindu & Thirum. (1955)
- Cercospora olivascens Sacc. (1878)
- Cercospora oplismeni Lall, H.S. Gill & Munjal (1962)
- Cercospora osiridis El-Gholl, Proffer & T.S. Schub. (1992)
- Cercospora oudhensis Mall (2011)
- Cercospora oxalidis A.S. Mull. & Chupp ex U. Braun & Crous (2003)
- Cercospora oxyphylli Pavgi & U.P. Singh (1971)

== P ==
- Cercospora pachyrhizicola Haldar (2017)
- Cercospora paederiicola Y.L. Guo (1991)
- Cercospora pakistanica S.A. Khan & M. Kamal (1963)
- Cercospora palmae-amazonensis Bat. & Cavalc. (1964)
- Cercospora palustrium Chupp (1954)
- Cercospora panacicola P.K. Chi & C.K. Pai (1965)
- Cercospora papavericola Chupp (1954)
- Cercospora papaverina Narayan, Kharwar & R.K. Singh (2001)
- Cercospora parakouensis Y. Meswaet, Mangelsdorff, Yorou & M. Piepenbr. (2021)
- Cercospora paridis Erikss. (1883)
- Cercospora pariensis Chupp (1954)
- Cercospora passiflorae-foetidae J.M. Yen (1964)
- Cercospora passiflorae-longipedis J.M. Yen (1974)
- Cercospora passifloricola Chupp (1954)
- Cercospora patriniae X.J. Liu & Y.L. Guo (1984)
- Cercospora pavettae-tomentosae Thirum. & Govindu (1957)
- Cercospora peckiana Chupp (1954)
- Cercospora pedicularia Nelen (1966)
- Cercospora pedicularidis Nelen (1966)
- Cercospora pegani X.J. Liu & Y.L. Guo (1984)
- Cercospora pellioniae Togashi & Katsuki (1952)
- Cercospora penniseti Chupp (1954)
- Cercospora pentatis S.D. Patil & Magdum (1979)
- Cercospora peregrina Chupp (1954)
- Cercospora pericampyli Munjal, Lall & Chona (1959)
- Cercospora peristrophes Thirum. & Govindu (1953)
- Cercospora peristrophigena R.K. Chaudhary, S. Narayan, U.C. Upadhyay & G.P. Rao (1995)
- Cercospora petiveriae Chupp (1954)
- Cercospora petroselini (Sacc.) Sacc. (1912)
- Cercospora petroselinicola Tosh. Hino & Tokeshi (1978)
- Cercospora petuniae A.S. Mull. & Chupp (1936)
- Cercospora petuniae (Saito) Chupp & A.S. Mull. (1950)
- Cercospora phaseolicola U. Braun & Mouch. (1999)
- Cercospora phaseoli-lunati U. Braun & Crous (2005)
- Cercospora phellodendri P.K. Chi & C.K. Pai (1965)
- Cercospora phlomidicola Mall (2015)
- Cercospora phyllanthicola S.A. Khan & M. Kamal (1963)
- Cercospora phyllanthi-pentandri J.M. Yen & Gilles (1975)
- Cercospora physalidis Ellis (1882)
- Cercospora physalidis-angulatae J.M. Yen & Gilles (1971)
- Cercospora physospermi Deighton (1969)
- Cercospora piaropi Tharp (1917)
- Cercospora picrasmae Togashi & Katsuki (1952)
- Cercospora pileicola C. Nakash., Crous, U. Braun & H.D. Shin (2012)
- Cercospora pingtungensis T.Y. Lin & J.M. Yen (1971)
- Cercospora piperis-betle Sawada & Katsuki (1959)
- Cercospora pistiae Nag Raj, Govindu & Thirum. (1971)
- Cercospora pithecellobiicola S. Narayan, H.S.G. Rao & H.D. Bhartiya (2000)
- Cercospora plantaginis Sacc. (1878)
- Cercospora platycerii Chupp (1954)
- Cercospora pleopeltidis Chidd. (1962)
- Cercospora plucheae-tomentosae Tripathi & R.S. Mathur (1965)
- Cercospora plumbaginea Sacc. & D. Sacc. (1902)
- Cercospora pogostemonis S. Chowdhury (1961)
- Cercospora poincianae U. Braun & Crous (2003)
- Cercospora polliae-japonicae Y.L. Guo & Y. Jiang (2000)
- Cercospora polygoni-multiflori S.Q. Chen & P.K. Chi (1994)
- Cercospora pontederiae Ellis & Dearn. (1893)
- Cercospora poonensis T.S. Viswan. (1959)
- Cercospora portulacae Thirum. & Govindu (1957)
- Cercospora pouzolziae-auriculatae Bagyan., U. Braun & Jagad. (1995)
- Cercospora pouzolziicola Bhartiya, Narayan, A.N. Singh bis & N. Kumari (2003)
- Cercospora praecincta (Davis) Chupp (1954)
- Cercospora premnicola Boedijn (1961)
- Cercospora privae Chupp (1954)
- Cercospora prosopidicola Sh. Kumar, Raghv. Singh, V.K. Pal, Upadhyaya & D.K. Agarwal (2007)
- Cercospora prunina J.M. Yen (1978)
- Cercospora pseudochenopodii Bakhshi, Arzanlou, Babai-ahari & Crous (2014)
- Cercospora pseudokalanchoes Crous & U. Braun (1994)
- Cercospora psophocarpicola J.M. Yen (1967)
- Cercospora psoraleae W.W. Ray (1941)
- Cercospora psylliostachydis Annal. (1978)
- Cercospora pteridigena M.K. Khan, R.K. Verma & Kamal (1992)
- Cercospora pudicae J.M. Yen (1964)
- Cercospora puerariae-thomsonii S.Q. Chen & P.K. Chi (1990)
- Cercospora punicacearum Kamal (2010)
- Cercospora pupaliae Patw. & A.K. Pande (1970)
- Cercospora putranjivae S.N. Khan, B.M. Misra & Rehill (1988)
- Cercospora pycnanthemicola Munjal, Lall & Chona (1960)
- Cercospora pycnicola Chona, Lall & Munjal (1959)

== Q ==
None

== R ==
- Cercospora rabdosiae P.K. Chi & Z.D. Jiang (1994)
- Cercospora radiata Fuckel (1865)
- Cercospora raipurensis S. Chowdhury (1969)
- Cercospora rajendrella Mall & Ajay Kumar (2013)
- Cercospora raphiae Deighton (1986)
- Cercospora rautensis C. Massal. (1909)
- Cercospora rejouae Thirum. & Govindu (1953)
- Cercospora resedae Fuckel (1866)
- Cercospora rhagadioli Bubák (1906)
- Cercospora rhamni Fuckel (1865)
- Cercospora rhizophorae Creager (1963)
- Cercospora rhynchophora Y. Meswaet, Mangelsdorff, Yorou & M. Piepenbr. (2021)
- Cercospora rhynchosiae Pavgi & U.P. Singh (1964)
- Cercospora rhynchosiae-minimae Thirum. & Govindu (1953)
- Cercospora ribis Earle (1898)
- Cercospora ricinella Sacc. & Berl. (1885)
- Cercospora rigidipes Munt.-Cvetk. (1960)
- Cercospora riofranciscana Bat., J.L. Bezerra & Peres (1965)
- Cercospora riveae Rao & M.A. Salam (1960)
- Cercospora rivinae Chupp & J.A. Stev. (1954)
- Cercospora rodmanii Conway (1976)
- Cercospora rottboelliicola J.M. Yen (1975)
- Cercospora rottboelliigena .L. Guo & Y. Jiang (2000)
- Cercospora roupalae Bat. & Peres (1960)
- Cercospora roxburghii Purkay. & Mallik (1976)
- Cercospora rubrotincta Ellis & Everh. (1887)
- Cercospora ruellina R.K. Chaudhary, S. Narayan, U.C. Upadhyay & G.P. Rao (1995)
- Cercospora rumicis Pavgi & U.P. Singh (1964)
- Cercospora rumicis-obtusifolii U. Braun (1993)
- Cercospora rungiae M.S. Patil (1978)
- Cercospora ruscicola V.G. Rao & A.S. Patil (1972)
- Cercospora ryukyuensis Tak. Kobay. & Y. Kawabe (1992)

== S ==
- Cercospora saccharini Liberta & Boewe (1961)
- Cercospora sagittariae Ellis & Kellerm. (1886)
- Cercospora salicis-babylonicae J.M. Yen (1966)
- Cercospora samambaiae Guatim., R.W. Barreto & Crous (2016)
- Cercospora sambucicola U. Braun (2015)
- Cercospora sancti-marini (Sacc.) Vassiljevsky (1937)
- Cercospora sarachae (Syd.) Chupp (1954)
- Cercospora saudii Mohammed (1987)
- Cercospora sauropodis S.Q. Chen & P.K. Chi (1990)
- Cercospora savulescui Sandu (1959)
- Cercospora scaevolae (Racib.) U. Braun (1992)
- Cercospora scandens Sacc. & G. Winter (1883)
- Cercospora scharifii Petr. (1957)
- Cercospora schefflericola P.G. Xi, P.K. Chi & Z.D. Jiang (2003)
- Cercospora sciadophila (Speg.) Chupp (1954)
- Cercospora scopariae Lacy & Thirum. (1951)
- Cercospora scorzonerae (Höhn.) U. Braun (1993)
- Cercospora scrophulariae (Moesz) Chupp (1954)
- Cercospora scrophulariicola P.K. Chi (1994)
- Cercospora secalis Chupp (1954)
- Cercospora sechii J.A. Stev. (1919)
- Cercospora sechiicola S. Narayan, Kharwar, R.K. Singh & Bhartiya (1998)
- Cercospora securinegicola Kamal (2010)
- Cercospora senecionis-grahamii Thirum. & Govindu (1963)
- Cercospora senecionis-walkeri Phengs., Chukeat., McKenzie, K.D. Hyde & U. Braun (2012)
- Cercospora sesami Zimm. (1904)
- Cercospora sesamicola Mohanty (1958)
- Cercospora sesamigena J.M. Yen & Lim (1973)
- Cercospora setariae G.F. Atk. (1892)
- Cercospora simaroubaciensis G.P. Agarwal & N.D. Sharma (1973)
- Cercospora smilacigena U. Braun & Crous (2005)
- Cercospora sojina Hara (1915)
- Cercospora solani Thüm. (1880)
- Cercospora solani-betacei B.W. Ferreira & R.W. Barreto (2018)
- Cercospora solanicola G.F. Atk. (1892)
- Cercospora solanigena Bhartiya, R. Dubey & S.K. Singh (2000)
- Cercospora solani-hirti R.E.D. Baker & W.T. Dale (1951)
- Cercospora solani-melongenae Chupp (1948)
- Cercospora solani-nigri Chidd. (1962)
- Cercospora solani-tuberosi Thirum. (1953)
- Cercospora sonchi Chupp (1954)
- Cercospora sonchifolia Chidd. (1962)
- Cercospora sophorae T.S. Ramakr. & K. Ramakr. (1950)
- Cercospora sorghi Ellis & Everh. (1887)
- Cercospora sorghicola Bakhshi, Arzanlou, Babai-ahari, Crous & U. Braun (2014)
- Cercospora spathulata Liberato & McTaggart (2008)
- Cercospora speculariae Ellis & Langl. ex Chupp (1954)
- Cercospora spermacoces Thirum. & Govindu (1963)
- Cercospora sphaeralceicola (Speg.) Chupp (1954)
- Cercospora sphaeranthi M.S. Patil (1976)
- Cercospora sphenocleae Deighton (1959)
- Cercospora stachyuricola X.J. Liu & Y.L. Guo (1984)
- Cercospora stahlianthi Z.D. Jiang & P.K. Chi (1994)
- Cercospora stanleyae Chupp ex U. Braun & Crous (2003)
- Cercospora stephaniae Sawada & Katsuki (1959)
- Cercospora sterculiae Lall & H.S. Gill (1963)
- Cercospora stevensonii Chupp (1954)
- Cercospora stomatophila (Speg.) U. Braun (1994)
- Cercospora strebli M. Mandal (1978)
- Cercospora strigae Nag Raj, Govindu & Thirum. (1971)
- Cercospora strobilanthis Chidd. (1962)
- Cercospora styracicola X.J. Liu & Y.L. Guo (1984)
- Cercospora subhyalina H.D. Shin & U. Braun (1995)
- Cercospora syngoniicola U. Braun & Urtiaga (2013)

== T ==
- Cercospora tabebuiae-impetiginosae Inácio & Dianese (1998)
- Cercospora taccae (Syd. & P. Syd.) Chupp (1954)
- Cercospora tagetea Cif. (1954)
- Cercospora tagetis-erectae Thirum. & Govindu (1957)
- Cercospora tamarindi S.N. Khan, B.M. Misra & Rehill (1988)
- Cercospora tarrii Deighton (1959)
- Cercospora tecta Vaghefi, S.J. Pethybridge & R.G. Shivas (2021)
- Cercospora tectonigena Kamal & V.K. Pal (2010)
- Cercospora tentaculifera Y. Meswaet, Mangelsdorff, Yorou & M. Piepenbr. (2021)
- Cercospora tephrosiicola Narayan, Kharwar & R.K. Singh (2001)
- Cercospora teramnicola Ragunathan & K. Ramakr. (1965)
- Cercospora tetracerae Bat., J.L. Bezerra & Cavalc. (1964)
- Cercospora tetrastigmatis Pandotra & Ganguly (1964)
- Cercospora tezpurensis Meghvansi, M.H. Khan & V. Veer (2013)
- Cercospora thalictricola Miura (1962)
- Cercospora thirumalachariana Pavgi & H.P. Upadhyay (1966)
- Cercospora thirumalacharii Chidd. (1962)
- Cercospora thunbergiana J.M. Yen (1965)
- Cercospora thunbergiigena U. Braun (2015)
- Cercospora tithoniicola J.M. Yen (1966)
- Cercospora torilidis Chupp (1954)
- Cercospora trachyspermi Golovin (1950)
- Cercospora tragiae-folii A.K. Kar & M. Mandal (1974)
- Cercospora tragiicola U. Braun, D.F. Farr & Minnis (2009)
- Cercospora trapae Thirum. & Govindu (1954)
- Cercospora trapae-bispinosae Govindu & Thirum. (1957)
- Cercospora traversoana Sacc. (1904)
- Cercospora trematis-orientalicola R.K. Srivast., A.K. Srivast. & Kamal (1995)
- Cercospora trewiae A.K. Kar & M. Mandal (1969)
- Cercospora trianthematis Chidd. (1962)
- Cercospora tricholepidis M.S. Patil (1976)
- Cercospora tridacicola Pavgi & U.P. Singh (1964)
- Cercospora tridacis-procumbentis Thirum. & Govindu (1953)
- Cercospora triumfettae-rhomboideae R.K. Srivast., Narayan & N. Kumari (2001)
- Cercospora triumfetticola Munjal, Lall & Chona (1960)
- Cercospora tussilaginis Y.L. Guo & Y. Jiang (2002)
- Cercospora tylophorae T.S. Ramakr. & K. Ramakr. (1950)
- Cercospora tylophorina P.N. Rao (1962)
- Cercospora typhae N.P. Golovina (1964)
- Cercospora typhoidis N.D. Sharma & A.C. Jain (1967)
- Cercospora typhonii Munjal, Lall & Chona (1961)

== U ==
- Cercospora udaipurensis Prasad, R.D. Singh & G.C. Bhatn. (1961)
- Cercospora ulmicola Chupp (1954)
- Cercospora uredinophila (Sacc.) Deighton (1969)
- Cercospora uwebrauniana M. Bakhshi & Crous (2018)

== V ==
- Cercospora vangueriae S. Chowdhury (1957)
- Cercospora varanasiana Pavgi & U.P. Singh (1964)
- Cercospora verbesinicola U. Braun, Delhey & Kiehr (2001)
- Cercospora vernoniicola J.M. Yen (1974)
- Cercospora vicoae Syd. (1929)
- Cercospora vignae-subterraneae Y. Meswaet, Mangelsdorff, Yorou & M. Piepenbr. (2021)
- Cercospora vignae-vexillatae R.E.D. Baker & W.T. Dale (1951)
- Cercospora vignigena C. Nakash., Crous, U. Braun & H.D. Shin (2012)
- Cercospora violae Sacc. (1876)
- Cercospora vochysiae Bat. & Peres (1964)
- Cercospora volkameriae Speg. (1908)

== W ==
- Cercospora wagateae Thirum. & Govindu (1963)
- Cercospora waltheriae-indicae J.M. Yen & Gilles (1970)
- Cercospora wedeliae-glaucae U. Braun, Delhey & Kiehr (2001)
- Cercospora wedeliicola A.K. Kar & M. Mandal (1970)
- Cercospora weigelae-japonicae Y.L. Guo & Y. Jiang (2000)
- Cercospora wendlandiae T.S. Ramakr. & Sundaram (1953)

== X ==
- Cercospora xanthii-strumarii Bhartiya, A.N. Singh bis, N. Kumari & P.N. Singh (1998)
- Cercospora xanthosomatis Gonz. Frag. & Cif. (1928)

== Y ==
None

== Z ==
- Cercospora zeae-maydis Tehon & E.Y. Daniels (1925)
- Cercospora zebrina Pass. (1877)
- Cercospora zeina Crous & U. Braun (2006)
- Cercospora zeyherifolii Bat. & Peres (1960)
- Cercospora zingibericola A.K. Kar & M. Mandal (1969)
- Cercospora zingiberis Togashi & Katsuki (1952)
- Cercospora zinniae Ellis & G. Martin (1885)
- Cercospora zinniicola A. Pande (1976)
- Cercospora zizaniae Thirum. & Govindu (1953)
- Cercospora ziziphigena Li Xu & Y.L. Guo (2003)
- Cercospora zonata G. Winter (1884)
- Cercospora zorniicola Y. Meswaet, Mangelsdorff, Yorou & M. Piepenbr. (2021)
