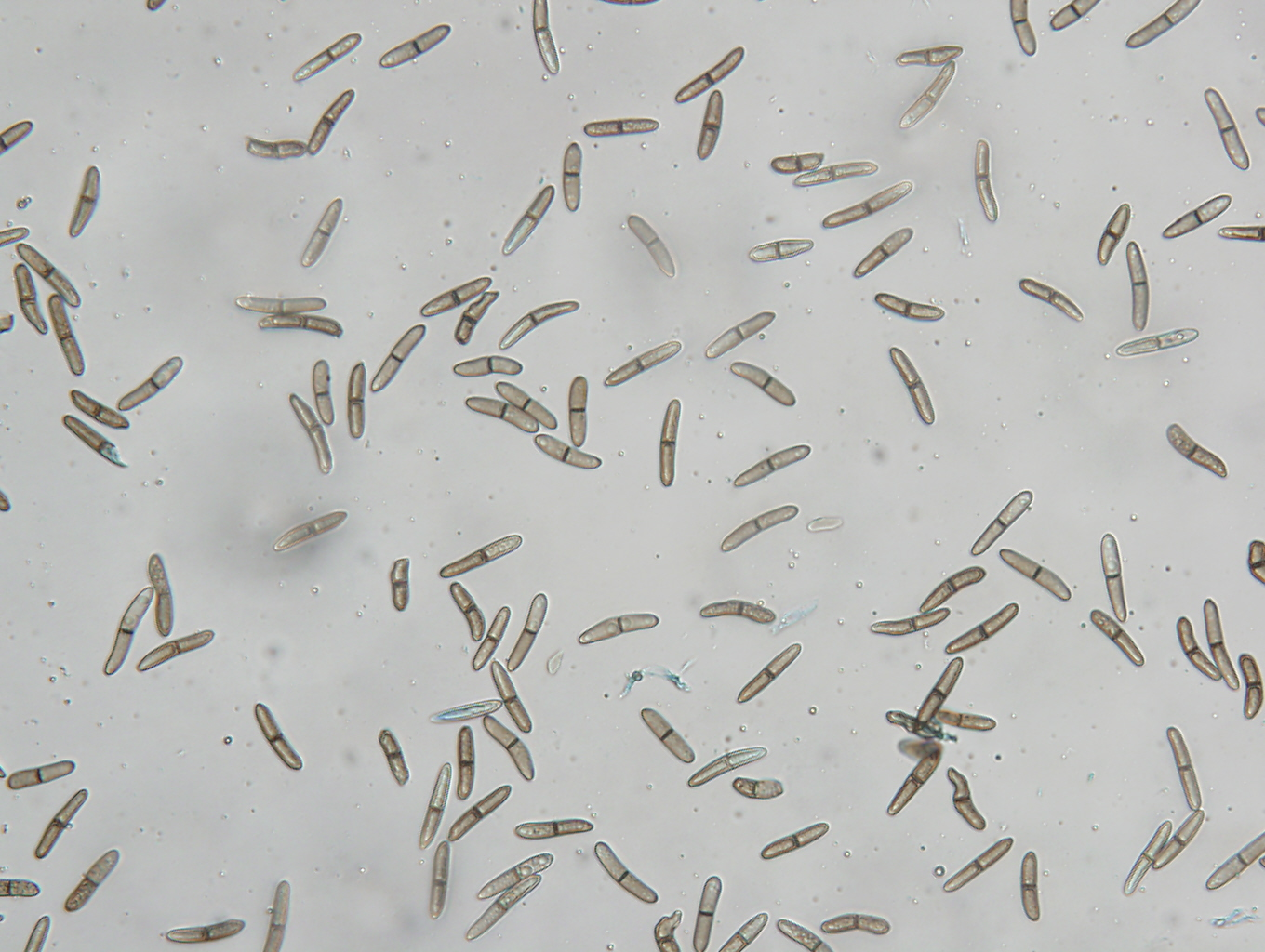

Scientific classification
- Kingdom: Fungi
- Division: Ascomycota
- Class: Sordariomycetes
- Order: Diaporthales
- Family: Diaporthaceae
- Genus: Stenocarpella
- Species: S. maydis

Binomial name
- Stenocarpella maydis (Berk.) Sutton

= Stenocarpella maydis =

Species of fungus

Stenocarpella maydis (Berk.) Sutton (syns. Diplodia maydis (Berk.) Sacc. and D. zeae (Schwein.) Lév.) is a plant pathogenic fungus and causal organism of diplodia ear and stalk rot. Corn (Zea mays) and canes (Arundinaria sp.) are the only known hosts to date. No teleomorph of the fungus is known.

Stenocarpella maydis can significantly reduce yield or grain quality (see – Symptoms and Signs) as there is a decrease on kernel size, and lower test weight. If infection occurs early, some ears may not produce harvestable grain or seed vigor can be compromised. Delayed harvest and wet weather before harvest can allow fungal growth to continue, further reducing grain marketability. Further, some animals may reject contaminated corn-based feed. Stenocarpella rot has the potential to affect distillers dried grains with solubles (DDGS) composition, but not ethanol yield on an equivalent weight basis. Although not common, when the conditions are conducive, this organism can produce mycotoxins (see – Importance), toxic compounds to mammals.

== Symptoms and signs ==
If the corn plant becomes infected soon after flowering, the husks appear bleached to straw color. Mycelial growth on corn ears typically begin at the base of the ear. In advanced stages of disease, this can result in a light-weight mummified ears attributed to the release of extracellular hydrolytic activities of acid protease, xylanases, and cellulases. During late season, this ascomycete on the plant can be recognized by the production of small raised, black fungal reproductive structures (pycnidia) on infected kernels, cob, husks, or stalks giving it an irregular feeling when touched. When infection happens several weeks after flowering, ears may be asymptomatic, with a possible brown discoloration, or seldom show mycelium between kernels. Some isolates may cause premature germination of the corn kernels. In stalk infections, injury to the vascular system disrupts translocation and, thus, reduces grain size.

== Biology and epidemiology ==
S. maydis overwinters on diseased plant debris (husks, stalks). During wet conditions, flask-shaped pycnidia embedded on debris produces two-celled conidia. Diplodia ear rot takes place when conidia are spread via rain and wind into the plant during early silking until two to three weeks after silks start to senesce. Alternatively, conidia can penetrate husks, typically at the base of the ear. Fungal growth is most common during milk, dough and dent stages. Diplodia stalk rot takes place mainly in the crown, mesocotyl, roots, and less frequently on the nodes between the crown and the ear. For both diseases, points of entry are facilitated by pest (e.g. bird, insect) damage, predisposing the host. Earworm (Helicoverpa zea) damage at the ear shank is often associated with the disease.

Diplodia rot is most severe for mono cropping systems, or when wet weather occurs shortly after silking, particularly for susceptible corn varieties with upright ears and tight husks. S. maydis occurs in cool, humid temperate areas, whereas the closely related S. macrospora, with similar symptoms but whose only host is corn, tend to happen in warm, humid zones.

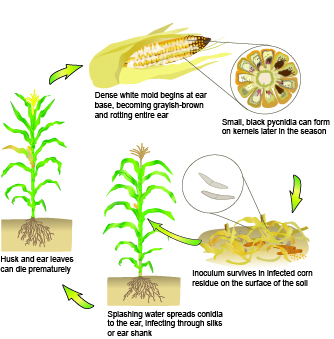
Corn Diplodia disease cycle Crop Protection Network

== Worldwide incidence ==
The incidence of Diplodia ear and stalk rots is dependent of climatic factors. Epidemics have been associated with early droughts and late season rains. The incidence of infected corn in the field may range from 1-2% or as high as 75-80%. Some regions throughout the globe associated with Stenocarpella maydis include:

- North America: Canada, Mexico (unconfirmed), USA (Florida, Illinois, North Carolina, South Dakota).
- Central America: Guatemala, Belize, El Salvador, Honduras
- South America: Argentina, Brazil, Colombia, Ecuador
- European and Mediterranean region: Austria, Czech Republic, Italy, France, Russia
- Africa: Kenya, Malawi, Nigeria, South Africa, Tanzania, Zaire, Zimbabwe
- Asia: China (widespread), India (unconfirmed), Iran, Taiwan
- Oceania: Australia (New South Wales)

== Management ==
=== Cultural control ===
- Timely planting: Alternate planting dates when possible. Spreading silk dates will reduce the risk of Diplodia infection.
- Crop rotation: Alternate non-host crops at least one year out of corn to decrease the presence of the pathogen resting structures in subsequent seasons.
- Tillage: Removal/Degradation of corn residues during the fall can help reduce disease levels.
- Irrigation timing: Overhead irrigation can splash disperse S. maydis spores from infected corn plants to adjacent healthy plants.
- Grain drying and selection: Prior to storage, dry grain below 13-15% to halt mold growth. Prior to storage, clean dried grain by removing lighter, damaged kernels, cobs and fines. Routinely screen grain and store the most infected grain separately to reduce disease spread.
- Others: Burying corn residue provides some degree of disease control. Cool infected grain below 50 °F (19 °C) soon after harvest and store at 30 °F (-1.1 °C) to delay the development of infection.

=== Host resistance ===
Corn hybrids vary in their susceptibility to S. maydis. Flint cultivars are more resistant than dent, and resistance breeding offers promise for control, however complete resistance (immunity) is not available. Some seed suppliers offer Diplodia rot resistance ratings for their hybrids. Further, resistance to insects can reduce damage and disease severity. Genetic resistance to Diplodia stalk rot is highly correlated with resistance to Gibberella stalk rot.

=== Chemical control ===
The potential benefits of fungicides to control Diplodia rot remain ambiguous. It is recommended to apply fungicides when foliar disease is evident at high levels to help minimize stalk damage during grain fill. Some experimental findings include:

- Propiconazole and prothioconazole show promising results on a laboratory scale in reducing fungal growth under controlled conditions. In field applications, however, neither has shown successful Diplodia rot reduction.
- Benomyl (Benlate) and mancozeb (Dithane M-45) have shown a degree of effectiveness in controlling S. maydis in the Nigerian Savanna.
- A triazole product and a QoI strobilurin + triazole mix product tested by researchers at Purdue University did not consistently reduce disease severity.

=== Biological control ===
While not as commonly used as the previously described management strategies, several studies show promising results with a biocontrol approach. Examples follow:

- Two Streptomyces sp. Isolates, designated DAUFPE 11470 and DAUFPE 14632, isolated from corn rhizosphere soil, significantly reduced S. maydis incidence by 93.2% and 92.3%, respectively.
- Strains of Pseudomonas spp., P. fluorescens, Pantoea agglomerans, and Bacillus subtilis inhibited the development of this fungus for the production of compounds with antifungal activity.

== Importance ==
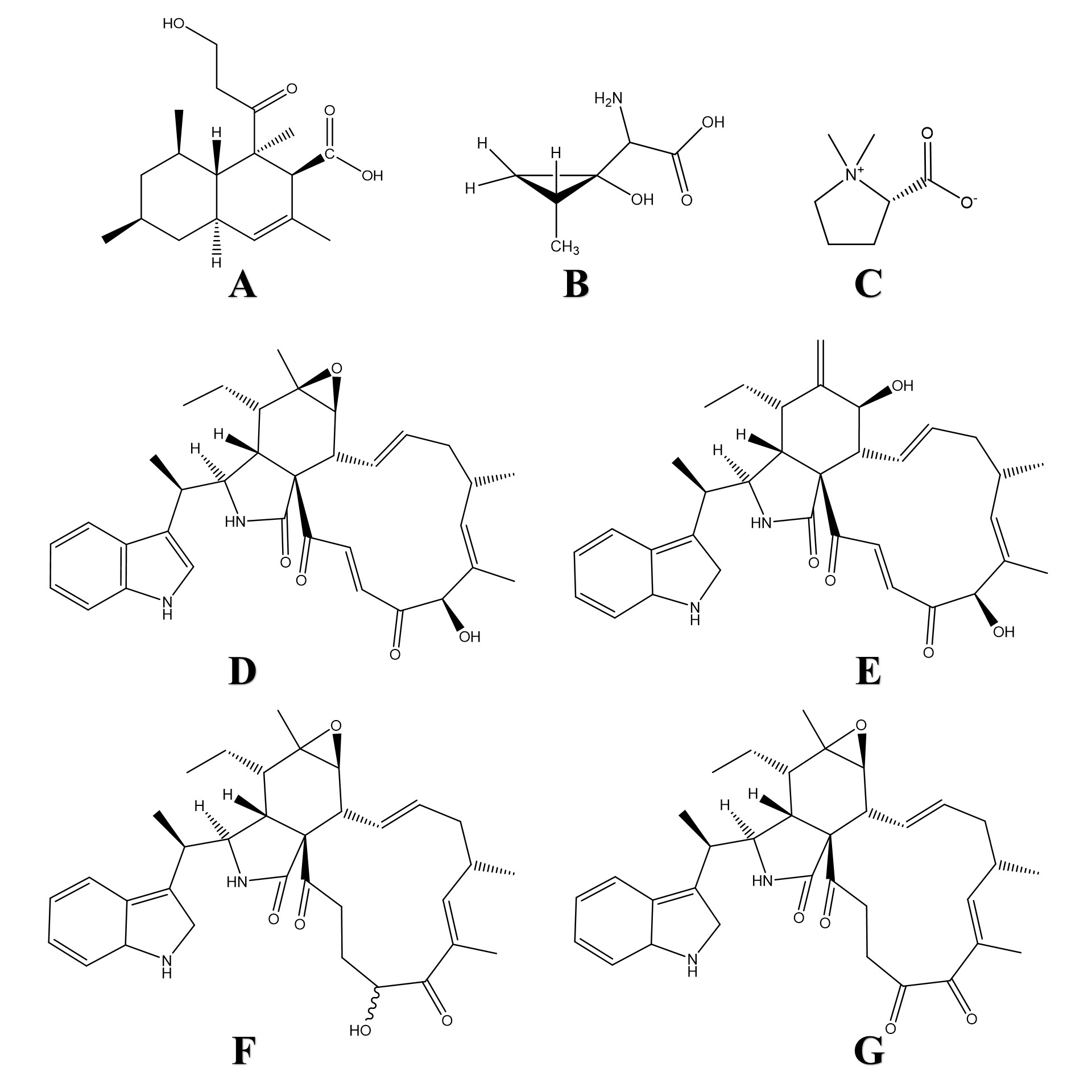
Examples of Diplodia toxins. Structures of: A) diplodiatoxin, B) diplonine, C) stachydrine (proline betaine), D) chaetoglobosin K, E) chaetoglobosin L, F) chaetoglobosin O, G) chaetoglobosin M

S. maydis is capable of producing mycotoxins, but no case has been reported regarding Diplodia rot in the United States and Canada. However, there have been some mycotoxicoses (Diplodiosis) in South America and Africa due to this fungus. This manifests as a nervous disorder (neuromycotoxicosis), characterized by neurological disorders such as ataxia, paralysis, and liver damage in farm animals fed or grazing on S. maydis-infected corn. Further, Diplodia-infected corn used in the chicken broiler and egg laying industries has resulted in reduced performance. Mycotoxins produced by this phytopathogen include diploidiatoxin, chaetoglobosins, and diplonine, to which all associated with diplodiosis. Moreover, Chaetoglobosin K has potential as an antifungal. A study by Wicklow et al showed promising antifungal activity against Aspergillus flavus and Fusarium verticillioides

== See also ==
- List of maize diseases
