= WMOV =

WMOV may refer to:

- WMOV (AM), a radio station (1360 AM) licensed to Ravenswood, West Virginia, United States
- WMOV-FM, a radio station (107.7 FM) licensed to Norfolk, Virginia, United States
- Wheat mosaic virus (disambiguation) (WMoV), a virus of cereal crops
