= Periconia elegans =

Scientific classification
- Kingdom: Fungi
- Division: Ascomycota
- Class: Dothideomycetes
- Order: Pleosporales
- Family: incertae sedis
- Genus: Periconia
- Species: P. elegans

Binomial name
- Periconia elegans (Penz. & Sacc.) S. Hughes, 1958

Synonyms
- Campsotrichum elegans Penz. & Sacc., 1902

Species of fungus

Periconia elegans is a species of sac fungi in the order Pleosporales.
