= Periconia circinata =

Scientific classification
- Kingdom: Fungi
- Division: Ascomycota
- Class: Dothideomycetes
- Order: Pleosporales
- Family: incertae sedis
- Genus: Periconia
- Species: P. circinata

Binomial name
- Periconia circinata (L. Mangin) Sacc., (1906)

Synonyms
- Aspergillus circinatus L. Mangin, (1899)

Species of fungus

Periconia circinata is an ascomycete fungus that is a plant pathogen affecting maize and sorghum.

== See also ==
- List of maize diseases
- List of sorghum diseases
