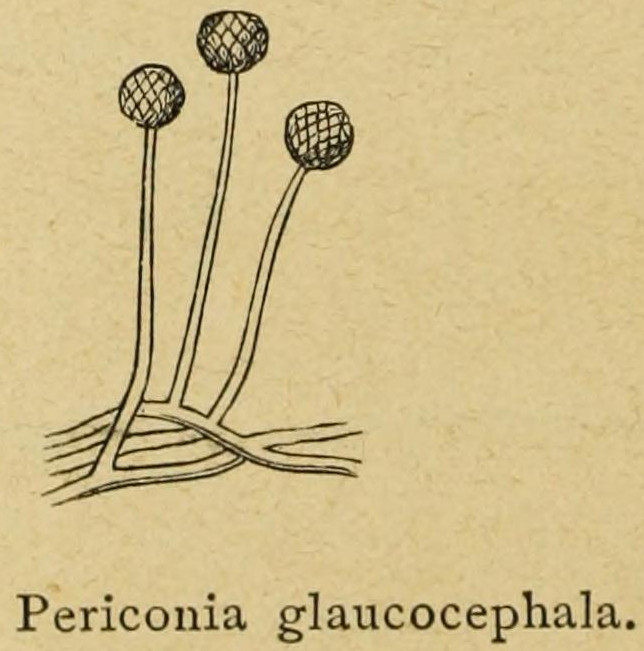
- Periconia glaucocephala

Scientific classification
- Kingdom: Fungi
- Division: Ascomycota
- Class: Dothideomycetes
- Order: Pleosporales
- Family: incertae sedis
- Genus: Periconia; Tode Ex Fries, 1791

Species
- Many, including: Periconia circinata; Periconia elegans

Synonyms
- Berkeleyna O. Kuntze, 1898; Harpocephalum; Atkinson, 1897; Pachytrichum Sydow, 1925; Sporocybe; Fries, 1825; Sporodum Corda, 1837; Trichocephalum; Costantin, 1888

= Periconia =

Genus of fungi

Periconia is a genus of sac fungi in the order Pleosporales. Fossils of Periconia have been reported from 12 million year old rocks from central England and from Baltic amber from Eocene epoch (34-38 Mya).
