= Maize mosaic virus =

Virus classification
- (unranked): Virus
- Realm: Riboviria
- Kingdom: Orthornavirae
- Phylum: Negarnaviricota
- Class: Monjiviricetes
- Order: Mononegavirales
- Family: Rhabdoviridae
- Genus: Alphanucleorhabdovirus
- Species: Maize mosaic alphanucleorhabdovirus

Synonyms
- virus del enanismo rayado maiz maize stripe Indian virus sorghum chlorosis virus zea mays virus

Species of virus

Maize mosaic virus (MMV) is a plant pathogenic virus of the family Rhabdoviridae.
