= Cochliobolus victoriae =

Scientific classification
- Kingdom: Fungi
- Division: Ascomycota
- Class: Dothideomycetes
- Order: Pleosporales
- Family: Pleosporaceae
- Genus: Cochliobolus
- Species: C. victoriae

Binomial name
- Cochliobolus victoriae R.R. Nelson, (1960)

Synonyms
- Bipolaris victoriae (F. Meehan & H.C. Murphy) Shoemaker, (1959); Drechslera victoriae (F. Meehan & H.C. Murphy) Subram. & B.L. Jain, (1966); Helminthosporium sativum var. victoriae (F. Meehan & H.C. Murphy) H.R. Rosen, Wiser & J.O. York, (1953); Helminthosporium victoriae F. Meehan & H.C. Murphy, (1946)

Species of fungus

Cochliobolus victoriae is a fungal plant pathogen. It caused the disease called "Victoria blight" affecting oats and similar grains.

== Symptoms ==
Cochliobolus victoriae is a fungus that causes Victoria blight in oats. Symptoms include stem weakening, seedling death, leaf damage, and premature ripening of seeds. Other symptoms include basal necrosis and foliar striping, which begins at the lower leaves and proceeds upwards. Blackened nodes and root rot can also be symptoms. Conidiophores emerge from the stomata or epidermal cells of the diseased oat, usually in groups of two to five, and are a medium-brown color.

== Importance ==
Victorian oat varieties have resistance to crown rust, which is considered one of the most important diseases in oats. In the 1940s, Victoria oats were very popular among American oat farmers because of this crown rust resistance. However, the same gene that grants crown rust resistance is also responsible for causing susceptibility to Victoria blight. Victoria blight was first reported in America in 1946. Victoria blight caused huge losses to oat yields, and in 1947 and 1948 it reached epidemic proportions in oat growing regions of America. These huge epidemics caused Victoria oat cultivars to be abandoned by growers Other varieties of oats are not susceptible to Victoria blight, so by switching to these other varieties, further outbreaks of Victoria blight have been prevented. However, this means that growers are unable to take advantage of the crown rust resistance that Victoria oats have. Thus, crown rust remains a serious disease in oats.

== Pathogenesis ==
Victoria type oats contain the Pc-2 gene which confers resistance against crown rust caused by the fungus Puccinia coronate. However, the oats that contained this gene are susceptible to Victoria blight. This is because the gene LOV1, which is part of the crown rot resistance, is responsible for susceptibility to Victoria blight. Cochliobolus victoriae produces the toxin victorin. Victorin only effects plants that contain the LOV1 gene, causing these plants to develop Victoria blight.
