= Gloeocercospora sorghi =

Scientific classification
- Kingdom: Fungi
- Division: Ascomycota
- Class: Ascomycetes
- Order: incertae sedis
- Family: incertae sedis
- Genus: Gloeocercospora
- Species: G. sorghi

Binomial name
- Gloeocercospora sorghi D.C. Bain & Edgerton (1943)

Species of fungus

Gloeocercospora sorghi is a plant pathogen and causal agent of zonate leaf spot also known as copper spot on Sorghum bicolor (though it can infect several other hosts). It is used as a bioherbicide.
