= Sclerophthora macrospora =

Scientific classification
- Domain: Eukaryota
- Clade: Sar
- Clade: Stramenopiles
- Clade: Pseudofungi
- Phylum: Oomycota
- Class: Oomycetes
- Order: Peronosporales
- Family: Peronosporaceae
- Genus: Sclerophthora
- Species: S. macrospora

Binomial name
- Sclerophthora macrospora (Sacc.) Thirum., (1953)

Synonyms
- Nozemia macrospora Phytophthora macrospora Phytophthora oryzae Sclerospora kriegeriana Sclerospora macrospora Sclerospora oryzae

Species of plant pathogen

Sclerophthora macrospora is a protist plant pathogen of the class Oomycota. It causes downy mildew on a vast number of cereal crops including oats, rice, maize, and wheat as well as varieties of turf grass. The common names of the diseases associated with Sclerophthora macrospora include "crazy top disease" on maize and yellow tuft disease on turf grass. The disease is present all over the world, but it is especially persistent in Europe.

== Host range ==
Sclerophthora macrospora has a wide host range, consisting of crops such as turf grass, maize, oats, rice, and wheat. The pathogen's lack of host specificity allows for widespread prevalence of the disease, and it affects a multitude of economically essential crops. Sclerophthora macrospora is the pathogen associated with downy mildew (or yellow tuft disease) on turf grass. The symptoms include proliferation of shoots and yellowing on cultivars of turf grass species. Additionally, Sclerophthora macrospora causes crazy top disease on maize. The symptoms of crazy top include phyllody and rapid increase in growth of tassels.

== Disease cycle ==
Sclerophthora macrospora is an obligate parasite. All oomycetes, including Sclerophthora macrospora, produce oospores. Oospores are sexual spores produced by the fusion of an antheridium and oogonium. The oospore germinates and produces sporangia on sporangiophores in damp late spring to autumn. Dissemination of the sporangium, which is pearly white and lemon shaped, is assisted by splashing water. The sporangium, aided by water transport, lands on a leaf surface and releases zoospores which infect the host plants by encysting near the stoma and penetrating the plant tissue with a germ tube. The leaf surface must remain damp or the sporangia will cave in. When wet conditions persist, sporangia can release many zoospores. The pathogen's zoospores on the infected leaf provide a secondary inoculum allowing for the disease to be polycyclic. Oospores and mycelium can survive on dead leaves. In well drained soils, oospores can persist for a few months. The oospores that survive over winter will then produce more sporangium in late spring. Sclerophthora macrospora also produces mycelia from spores, which absorb nutrients from the host plant.

== Management ==
Since Sclerophthora macrospora can infect a wide range of hosts, many growers will have to find a way to manage the pathogen. Cultural control, sanitary methods, and chemical control are common ways to prevent the disease. Typical cultural practices used include mowing only when grass is dry and avoiding over watering. Since the disease proliferates in wet conditions, it is best to ensure that fields are well drained so sporangia don't spread. Preventive fungicides applied under certain guidelines can reduce the amount of the pathogen's structures in the field - but the success is limited. Spring applications of the fungicide metalaxyl, known under the trade name Subdue, can be effective especially for yellow tuft disease. It is important to recognize that most fungicides for Sclerophthora macrospora are preventive type treatments, not curative. Therefore, it is vital that the grower recognizes the symptoms and signs as soon as possible. A variety of resistant strains have also been bred - most notably in maize. Some cultivars of rice are also resistant.
