= Maize line virus =

Virus classification
- Group: Group IV ((+)ssRNA)
- Family: Tombusviridae
- Genus: Aureusvirus
- Species: Maize line virus

Synonyms
- MWLMV

Species of virus

Maize line virus is a pathogenic plant virus.
