= Peronosclerospora sorghi =

Scientific classification
- Domain: Eukaryota
- Supergroup: Stramenopiles
- Division: Oomycota
- Class: Peronosporomycetes
- Order: Peronosporales
- Family: Peronosporaceae
- Genus: Peronosclerospora
- Species: P. sorghi

Binomial name
- Peronosclerospora sorghi (W. Weston & Uppal) C.G. Shaw, (1978)

Species of single-celled organism

Peronosclerospora sorghi is a plant pathogen. It is the causal agent of sorghum downy mildew. The pathogen is a fungal-like protist in the oomycota, or water mold, class. Peronosclerospora sorghi infects susceptible plants though sexual oospores, which survive in the soil, and asexual sporangia which are disseminated by wind. Symptoms of sorghum downy mildew include chlorosis, shredding of leaves, and death. Peronosclerospora sorghi infects maize and sorghum around the world, but causes the most severe yield reductions in Africa. The disease is controlled mainly through genetic resistance, chemical control, crop rotation, and strategic timing of planting.

== Hosts and symptoms ==
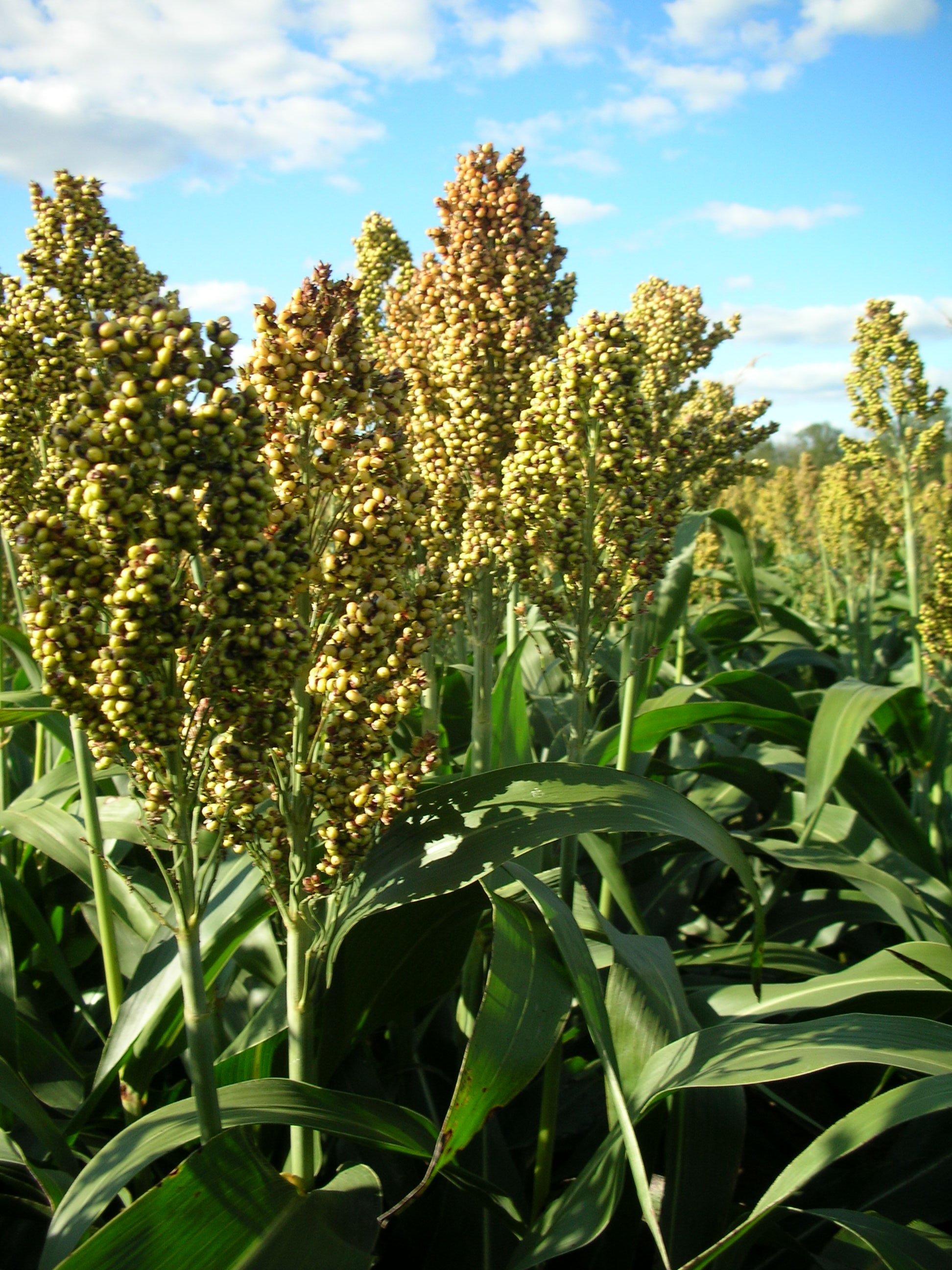
Sorghum field in Germany

Peronosclerospora sorghi has a broad host range, particularly plants in the sorghum genus. These host plants include Sorghum bicolor, or sorghum, Sorghum sudanense, or Sudan grass, and Sorghum halepense, or Johnsongrass. Its hosts also include Pinnisetum glaucum, or pearl millet, and Zea mays, or maize. When maize plants are infected as seedlings, the first symptom to appear is chlorosis of the leaves. As the plant grows, it often shows stunting, and necrotic lesions begin to form on the leaves. As the leaves continue to grow, a white, downy growth may develop in the necrotic lesions, especially on the underside of the leaves. This downy growth is the result of the production of conidia and conidiophores under the proper environmental conditions.

Sorghum and maize express very similar symptoms. In sorghum, chlorosis of the seedlings is very common after infection. As the leaves get older, they can express white striping, which eventually leads to the necrosis of the striped tissue. When the leaves die, they begin to become shredded in appearance, similar to hail damage. This symptom is associated with the production of oospores in the leaf tissue.

If sorghum plants are young and produce conidia on their leaves, this type of infection often leads to the death of the plant. If the sorghum plants are older, the pathogen will often produce oospores in the leaves. Plants are usually capable of surviving this type of infection and will survive until maturity. The disease may cause the tassels and ears of maize plants to develop improperly or not form at all. This also occurs within the panicle of the sorghum plant.

Key factors in diagnosing downy mildew caused by Peronosclerospora sorghi on maize and sorghum include chlorosis of the leaves, followed by white streaking of the leaves. The leaves could also have a white, downy growth on the underside of the leaf blade. The white streaked areas of leaves become necrotic over time, leading to a shredded leaf appearance. In the maturing plant, the reproductive structures do not form properly or do not form at all. This leads to a sterile plant.

== Disease cycle ==
Personosclerospora sorghi has a polycyclic disease cycle. It is capable of causing secondary infections of susceptible hosts throughout the growing season. Its resting structures, the structures that allow the pathogen to overwinter, are the oospores. These oospores are produced in the infected plants from the previous growing season. They are often disseminated by wind. The oospores can overwinter in the soil and in the debris on the surface of the soil. The oospores have very thick walls, which makes them capable of surviving in the soil for years under many different weather conditions.

It is also possible for oospores and mycelium to overwinter in the seeds of maize. The mycelium infects the scutellum of the seed. The oospores and mycelium that are present in the seed often lose their viability when the seeds are dried, but under the right circumstances, it is possible for these infected seeds to become a source of inoculum, infecting the maize plant as it grows. Infection of the seed itself often occurs if the plant that produced said seed was infected later in development.

The oospores are the main source of the primary inoculum of this disease. They are present in the soil when the host seedlings are germinating. The oospores then infect the roots of the seedlings. This type of infection is a systemic infection of the plant. The pathogen grows throughout the plant, infecting the leaves as they grow, leading to chlorosis. The chlorotic leaves develop white streaks. These white streaks are the location of oospore production. This only occurs in plants that were systemically infected as a seedling. When the oospores become mature, the white streaks on the leaves turn brown and become necrotic. These necrotic areas become shredded over time, which is how the mature oospores are disseminated. The spores are carried by the wind, and they become the source of inoculum in subsequent generations.

As the pathogen continues to develop in the host plant, there may also be production of conidia on the leaf surface. It is the conidia and the conidiophores that cause the white, downy growth on the undersides of the leaves. Conidia develop quickly and are released from their conidiophores within five hours of maturation. After they are released, they are wind disseminated. If the conidia land on mature host plants, they infect and cause local lesions on the leaves. These lesions do not systemically infect the plants, and there is little overall damage from them. If the conidia land on a plant that is only a few weeks old or less, the plant is susceptible to systemic infection by the conidia. The conidia can be the main cause of the infection if they are being produced on a host plant that is in the same area as other susceptible host plants that are just emerging from the ground.

== Environment ==
Peronosclerospora sorghi requires warm temperatures and high humidity for it to prosper. Oospores are usually the primary inoculum, and they are found in the soil. The soil must be moist to ensure proper germination of the oospores. Soils that have had little tillage will often stay damp longer than highly tilled soils and harbor oospores in the rooting zone of the host plant, which leads to an increased chance of infection. If the same host is grown in the same area year after year, the oospores may continue to build up in the soil, providing more primary inoculum for every following year.

There may be production of conidia if the environment is suitable. Conidia are produced when there has been rain, because moisture is a key factor in their production. Rain or high humidity causes leaf wetness, which is the optimal environment for the pathogen to produce the conidia. A normal temperature range for production is 55-75 degrees Fahrenheit. If these conditions are present, there will be innumerable conidia disseminated by the wind. The conidia is a source of secondary inoculum. If susceptible plants are being grown in the same area as these infected plants, the disease can spread rapidly as the conidia infect the surrounding susceptible plants.

== Management ==
A combination of chemical, genetic, and cultural methods are used to control sorghum downy mildew. A number of single-gene sources of resistance have been found, and many resistant varieties are commercially available. However, new pathotypes of the fungus continue to evolve to overcome different sources of host plant resistance. Seed treatments with the systemic fungicides metalaxyl and mefenoxam have been widely used to prevent systemic infections of sorghum downy mildew. Metalaxyl, which inhibits protein synthesis in the pathogen, can also be applied as a foliar spray. In Texas, use of these two fungicides, in conjunction with the use of resistant hybrids, made the disease a minor problem until one of the pathotypes endemic in the region evolved resistance to both chemicals.

A variety of cultural controls are effective against sorghum downy mildew. In areas where oospores are the principal source of inoculum, such as in the United States, crop rotation is an effective strategy, as oospores will be stimulated to germinate by both host and non-host crops, but will not be able to infect plants apart from corn, sorghum, and Johnsongrass. Flax (Linum usitatissimum) is an example of a trap crop that is used to reduce the amount of oospore inoculum in the soil, before a susceptible crop like sorghum or maize is planted. Deep tillage also reduces the amount of oospores surviving in the soil and therefore the incidence of the disease.

In areas where conidia are the principal source of inoculum, such as in most of the tropics, early planting can be effective in avoiding secondary infections. This is because an early crop will be able to avoid infection from conidia produced by later infected crops in the region. For inoculum that survives in seeds, drying to less than 20% moisture is effective in killing the pathogen.

== Importance ==
Sorghum bicolor is one of the most important cereal crops around the world, ranking fifth in production behind corn, rice, wheat, and barley. A significant proportion is grown in developing countries in tropical and subtropical regions, where it is a staple for both human and animal consumption, as opposed to in the United States where it is overwhelmingly used for animal feed. In many of the areas where sorghum is a staple crop, access to agricultural technology is poor and yields are low as a result. This makes control of sorghum downy mildew especially important, as infections can dramatically reduce yield even further.

Peronosclerospora sorghi causes the most significant yield reduction in corn and sorghum when plants are infected systemically. Models from the United States have demonstrated a direct relationship between incidence of systemic infection and yield loss. Sorghum downy mildew has been reported in 44 countries. It is endemic in many parts of sub-Saharan Africa, where it causes severe reductions in corn and sorghum yield. In corn, losses due to the disease are estimated to range from 15-20% in Uganda, and epidemics have caused losses from 10 to 100% in Zaire.
