= Cereal chlorotic mottle virus =

Cereal chlorotic mottle virus (CCMoV)

Virus classification
- Group: Group V ((−)ssRNA)
- Family: Rhabdoviridae
- Genus: Nucleorhabdovirus
- Species: Cereal chlorotic mottle virus

Species of virus

Cereal chlorotic mottle virus (CCMoV) is a plant pathogenic virus of the family Rhabdoviridae. It is a cicadellid-transmitted plant rhabdovirus associated with chlorotic and necrotic streaks on several gramineous hosts and weeds.
