= Cercosporin =

Fungal natural product

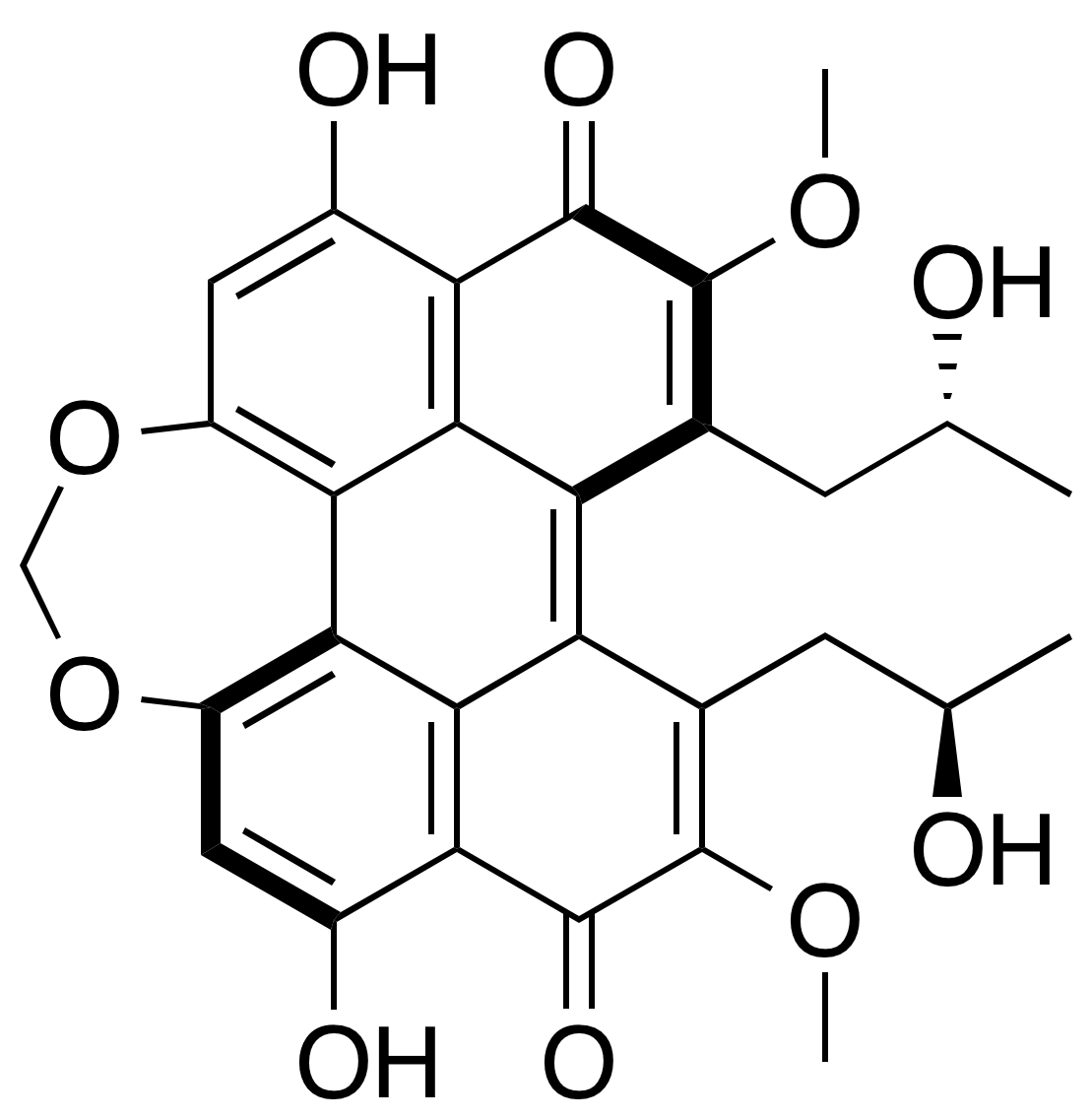

Names
- IUPAC name 7,19-dihydroxy-5,21-bis(2-hydroxypropyl)-6,20-dimethoxy-12,14-dioxahexacyclo[13.8.0.02,11.03,8.04,22.018,23]tricosa-1,3(8),4,6,10,15,18(23),19,21-nonaene-9,17-dione

Identifiers
CAS Number	35082-49-6
3D model (JSmol)	Interactive image
ChEBI	CHEBI:91878
ChEMBL	ChEMBL1080283
ChemSpider	2573
PubChem CID	2674
UNII	DK0O6YH55G
- InChI: InChI=1S/C29H26O10/c1-10(30)5-12-18-19-13(6-11(2)31)29(37-4)27(35)21-15(33)8-17-23(25(19)21)22-16(38-9-39-17)7-14(32)20(24(18)22)26(34)28(12)36-3/h7-8,10-11,30-31,34-35H,5-6,9H2,1-4H3 Key: MXLWQNCWIIZUQT-UHFFFAOYSA-N
- SMILES: CC(CC1=C2C3=C(C(=C(C4=C3C5=C6C2=C(C(=O)C=C6OCOC5=CC4=O)C(=C1OC)O)O)OC)CC(C)O)O

Properties
Chemical formula	C_{29}H_{26}O_{10}
Molar mass	534.517 g·mol^{−1}
- Except where otherwise noted, data are given for materials in their standard state (at 25 °C [77 °F], 100 kPa). Infobox references

Cercosporin is a toxic red pigment created by the fungal genus Cercospora. Cercospora act as pathogens on a variety of plants including corn, tobacco, soybean, and coffee. Cercosporin is a perylenequinone natural product that is photoactivated and uses reactive oxygen species (ROS) to damage cell components (membranes, proteins, lipids, etc.).

== Biosynthesis ==
Light is required for biosynthesis and activation of cercosporin, and it has been demonstrated that light, temperature, and culture medium are regulating factors in the production of cercosporin.

Cercosporin is biosynthesized via polyketide synthases, and there are several genes that have been found responsible in the creation of the natural product. Overall, there are 8 CTB enzymes (CTB1-8) that contribute to the production of cercosporin. CTB1 (cercosporin toxin biosynthesis) is a non-reducing PKS consisting of a KS, AT, TE/CYC and 2 ACP domains that are vital in the initiation of the creation of cercosporin. The other CTB enzymes are not as well studied, but play important roles in the biosynthesis. CTB2 acts as a methyl transferase, CTB3 also functions as a methyl transferase but also functions as a FAD-dependent monoxygenase, CTB4 is a MFS transporter, CTB5 is a FAD-dependent oxidoreductase, CTB6 is a NADPH-dependent ketone reductase, CTB7 is another FAD-dependent monoxygenase, and CTB8 is a transcription factor that regulates expression of the cluster. Figure 1 shows a general depiction of the proposed biosynthesis. As a result of the two hydroxypropyl substituents and the two oxygen substituents of the acetal linker, the perylene core twists out of planarity. The natural product occurs as a single atropisomer.

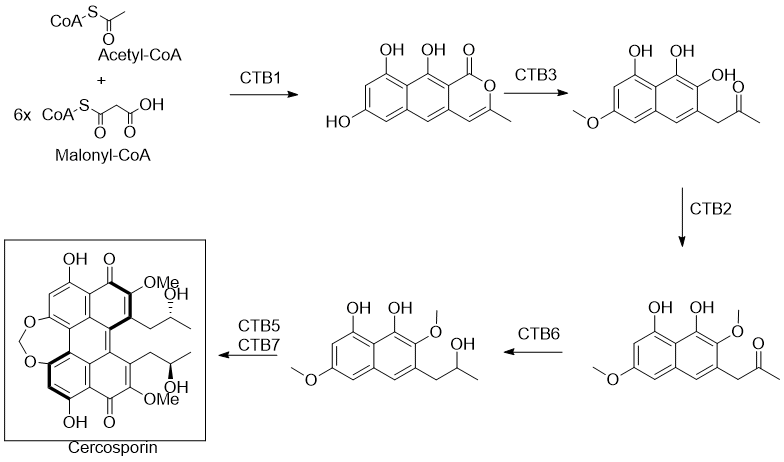
Figure 1: Proposed biosynthesis of cercosporin

== Plant defense and susceptibility ==
To combat the onset of disease caused by Cercospora fungi, it has been proven that growing plants in lower light intensities can reduce the amount and severity of lesions caused by cercosporin. Some plant species use chitinases as a general defense mechanism to stop fungal infections. It has been observed that cercosporin-producing fungi that contain the Avr4 gene produce an effector that acts as a chitin-binding protein, allowing the fungi to be more virulent.
