= Wheat mosaic virus =

Wheat mosaic virus can refer to a few different virus species:

- Chinese wheat mosaic virus, in the genus Furovirus
- High Plains wheat mosaic emaravirus, in the genus Emaravirus
- Japanese soil-borne wheat mosaic virus, in the genus Furovirus
- Soil-borne wheat mosaic virus, in the genus Furovirus
- Wheat streak mosaic virus, in the genus Tritimovirus
