= Cercospora sorghi =

Scientific classification
- Kingdom: Fungi
- Division: Ascomycota
- Class: Dothideomycetes
- Order: Capnodiales
- Family: Mycosphaerellaceae
- Genus: Cercospora
- Species: C. sorghi

Binomial name
- Cercospora sorghi Ellis & Everh., (1887)

Species of fungus

Cercospora sorghi is a fungal plant pathogen of sorghum.
