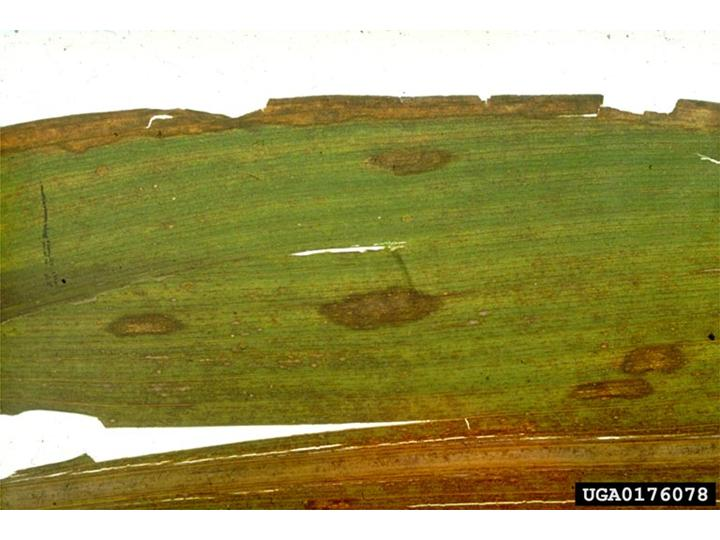
- Northern leaf spot of maize on corn

Scientific classification
- Kingdom: Fungi
- Division: Ascomycota
- Class: Dothideomycetes
- Order: Pleosporales
- Family: Pleosporaceae
- Genus: Cochliobolus
- Species: C. carbonum

Binomial name
- Cochliobolus carbonum R.R. Nelson, (1959)

Synonyms
- Bipolaris zeicola (G.L. Stout) Shoemaker, Drechslera carbonum (Ullstrup) Sivan., (1984); Drechslera zeicola (G.L. Stout) Subram. & B.L. Jain, (1966); Helminthosporium carbonum Ullstrup, (1944); Helminthosporium zeicola G.L. Stout, (1930)

= Cochliobolus carbonum =

Species of fungus

Cochliobolus carbonum (anamorph: Helminthosporium carbonum) is one of more than 40 species of filamentous ascomycetes belonging to the genus Cochliobolus (anamorph: Bipolaris/Curvularia). This pathogen has a worldwide distribution, with reports from Australia, Brazil, Cambodia, Canada, China, Congo, Denmark, Egypt, India, Kenya, New Zealand, Nigeria, Solomon Islands, and the United States. Cochliobolus carbonum is one of the most aggressive members of this genus infecting sorghum (Sorghum spp. [Poaceae]), corn (Zea mays [Poaceae]) and apple (Malus domestica [Rosaceae]). As one of the most devastating pathogens of sweet corn, C. carbonum causes Northern leaf spot and ear rot disease while the asexual stage causes Helminthosporium corn leaf spot. Cochliobolus carbonum is pathogenic to all organs of the corn plant including root, stalk, ear, kernel, and sheath. However, symptoms of infection show distinct manifestations in different plant parts: whole plant - seedling blight affects the whole plant, leaf discoloration and mycelial growth, black fungal spores and lesions appear on inflorescences and glumes, and grain covered with very dark brown to black mycelium which gives a characteristic charcoal appearance due to the production of conidia.

== Morphology and keys to identification ==
Cochliobolus carbonum is divided into at least five different races based on pathogenicity, particularly lesion types on corn leaves. Cochliobolus carbonum race 0 (CCR0) is essentially non-pathogenic. Cochliobolus carbonum race 1 (CCR1) produces host specific toxins and oval to circular spots on leaves. While infection by C. carbonum race 2 (CCR2) is rare, it is characterized by the production of oblong, chocolate-colored spots. C. carbonum race 3 (CCR3) produces linear and narrow lesions while C. carbonum race 4 (CCR4) is weakly pathogenic, forming oval to concentric circular spots.

The genus Cochliobolus is distinguished by the presence of dark to black ascomata with a unilocular, globose pseudothecium and a short, cylindrical neck. Ascomata also bear hyphae and conidiophores and asci are bitunicate, 2-8 spored, and cylindrical to obclavate. Ascomata are black, globose to ellipsoidal, and setae are present over the upper half of the wall mixed with conidiophores. Pseudoparaphyses are filiform, hyaline, septate, and branched. The shapes of asci are cylindrical to clavate, short-stalked, straight to slightly curved having 1-8 spores, and vestigial bitunicate. Conidia are straight to moderately curved, occasionally cylindrical but usually broad in the middle and tapering towards the rounded ends, distoseptate, and 36-100 X 12-18 μm. The surface of the conidia is often granulose and the hilum is inconspicuous. Conidia are produced from the apex of an unbranched conidiophore. Generally, the conidiophore arises singly or in small groups which are straight or flexuous, mid to dark brown, smooth, septate, cylindrical, and up to 250 μm long, 5-8 μm thick. Variation in mycotoxin production by Cochliobolus species is used to distinguish some taxa and these mycotoxins are host-specific and non-host specific. HC toxin produced by C. carbonum race 1 and T toxin produced by C. heterostrophus are host-specific toxins while ophiobolins produced by C. miyabeanus and carbotoxin produced by C. carbonum are non-host-specific toxins.

=== Reproductive biology ===
The species most closely related to C. carbonum is C. victoriae which have inter-specific fertility, however only 1% attempted crosses between species were fertile. The sister relationship of these two species were evident based on phylogenetic analysis. Cochliobolus carbonum is the sexual stage and can be obtained by pairing opposite mating single conidial isolates in Sach's agar media with sterilized maize leaf segments or barley grains incubated at 24 °C.

Crosses between different species of Cochliobolus are possible, producing offspring differing in conidial morphology. Horizontal and vertical gene transfer has occurred within and between fungal species of Cochliobolus and might be the reason for occurrence of highly virulent, toxin producing races of C. heterostrophus, C. carbonum and C. victoriae. In nature, there is no evidence of gene flow among races of C. carbonum despite their sympatry. The teleomorph of C. carbonum has not been observed in field conditions.

== Habitat preference, life cycle, dispersal and symptoms development ==
Fungi are capable of showing different interactions with their host and different lifestyles depending upon the interaction. Different species of Cochliobolus and its anamorphs are associated with different host species as epiphytes, endophytes, saprophytes and pathogens. Infected seed is the major source of inoculum of C. carbonum internationally, so it is a quarantined pathogen in Europe and other countries. To my knowledge, few studies have been conducted to better understand the life and infection cycle of C. carbonum. Cochliobolus carbonum survives as mycelium and resistant chlamydospores on maize debris in the field and on infected seed. Conidia serve as a primary source of inoculum dispersed by wind and rain-splash. Damp weather and moderate temperature greatly favor sporulation and produce additional inoculum for secondary spread. During both pathogenic and saprophytic phases of the lifecycle, this fungus enters and ramifies through intact leaves and obtains nutrients from the host cytoplasm and walls by degrading cell wall components through the production of a variety of extracellular enzymes. The symptoms first appear as small, circular to oval, reddish brown to tan lesions and over time become more tan to grayish. In general, moderate temperature, high relative humidity, and heavy dew during the growing season favors the development of this disease. Senescent corn leaves are an important plant part for the growth and development of C. carbonum, because it provides biochemicals required for the formation of perithecia, asci and ascospores.

== Important developments in classification ==
Previously, many species of Cochliobolus were placed in Ophiobolus. Drechsler found that graminicolous forms of Helminthosporium produced teleomorphs with characteristic features of greater ascus and ascospore width as well as helicoid ascospores with bipolar germination, which deviates from previously described characters of Ophiobolus. To accommodate these species, he introduced the new genus Cochliobolus transferred several species to Cochliobolus. Another genus Pseudocochliobolus was separated from Cochliobolus based on the presence of stromatic tissue below the ascomata and the degree of ascospore coiling. The sexual states of Cochliobolus are only found associated with Bipolaris and Curvularia. Bipolaris and Curvularia share some morphological similarities and cannot be easily distinguished by any distinct taxonomic criteria. Although few morphological differences were reported, conidia of Bipolaris are distoseptate while the conidia of Curvularia are bigger and euseptate. Some scientists believe that Bipolaris and Curvularia are synonymous, however there is an existing debate regarding this issue. The different species of fungi belonging to Cochliobolus with asexual states in Bipolaris and Curvularia have undergone frequent name changes as a result of refinement to the taxonomy that has resulted in some confusion. The perfect stage of this fungus was first named as C. carbonum by R. R. Nelson in 1959. The imperfect stage was named as Bipolaris zeicola in 1959. The commonly used synonyms of Cochliobolus carbonum were Helminthosporium zeicola (1930), Helminthosporium carbornum (1944), Drechslera zeiocola (1966) and Drechslera carbonum (1984). Several phylogenetic studies of Bipolaris and Curvularia showed that Bipolaris is not monophyletic and some Bipolaris species are nested within Curvularia.

== Phylogenetic affinities ==
The taxonomy of Cochliobolus, Bipolaris and Curvularia is confusing due to the frequent name changes and no clear morphological demarcation between Bipolaris and Curvularia. A phylogenetic analysis of Cochliobolus, Bipolaris and Curvularia species was performed using rDNA markers (ITS1, 5.8S, ITS2) and a 600 bp fragment of gpd (glyceraldehyde-3 dehydrogenase) gene. The results showed that most isolates of Cochliobolus and Bipolaris including C. carbonum, that cause serious crop losses, form a separate group from other species. These data revealed that these species radiated form a common ancestor recently. Another phylogenetic study was conducted using a combined analysis of rDNA ITS (internal transcribed spacer), GPDH (glyceraldehyde 3-phosphate dehydrogenase), LSU (large subunit) and EF1-α (translation elongation factor 1-α) and showed that this generic group is divided into two major lineages. According to their study Bipolaris and Cochliobolus species grouped with their type species and Curvularia species, with its generic type, form another group. Similar to previous findings, the analyses showed that Bipolaris and Curvularia cannot be combined into a single monophyletic genus and trees showed both of these groups resolved into single complex. In this paper, the authors claim that they have resolved nomenclatural conflict within this complex based on their phylogenetic data and suggest giving priority to the more commonly used generic names Bipolaris and Curvularia to represent these distinct lineages.
