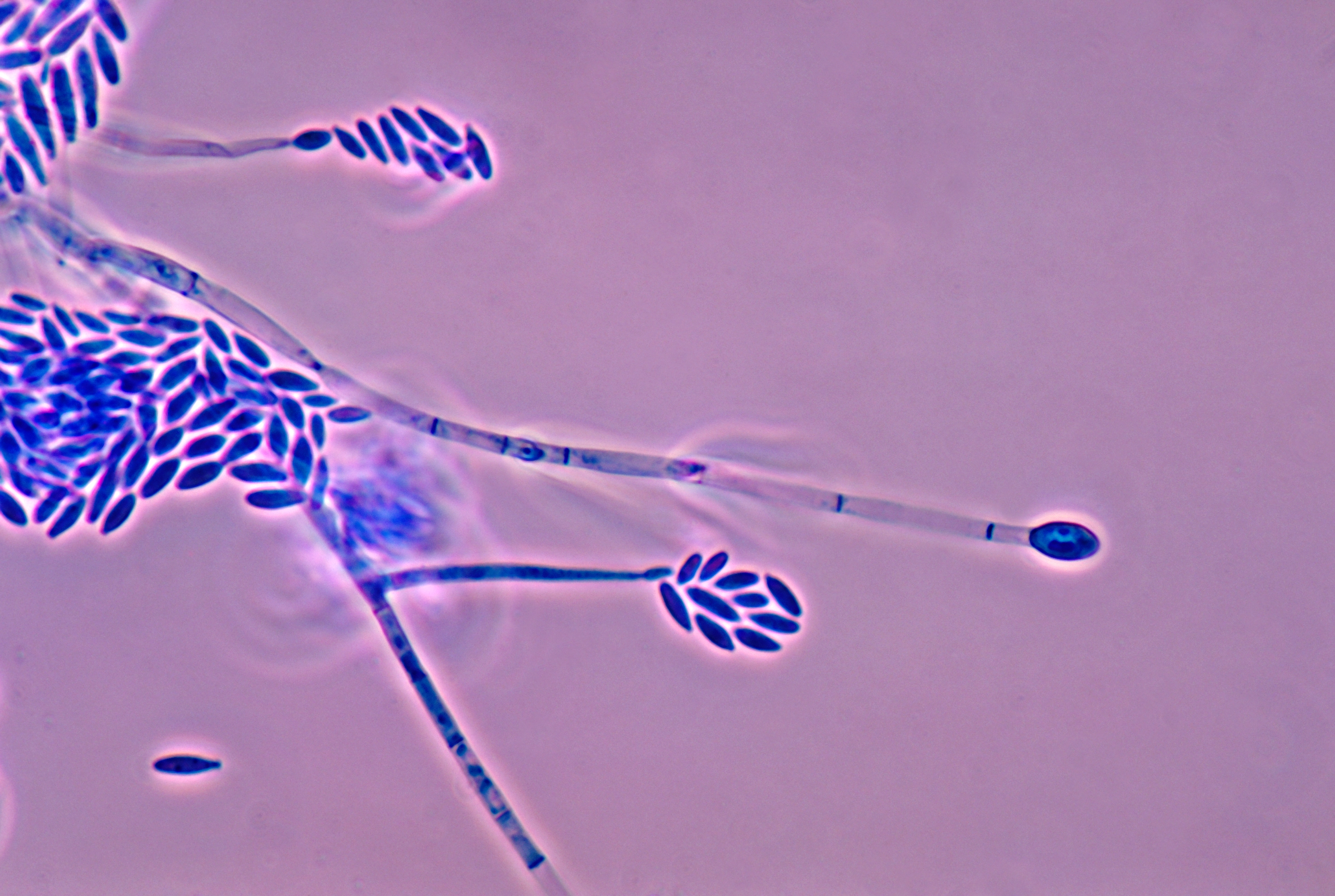

Scientific classification
- Domain: Eukaryota
- Kingdom: Fungi
- Division: Ascomycota
- Class: Sordariomycetes
- Order: Hypocreales
- Family: Nectriaceae
- Genus: Fusarium
- Species: F. verticillioides

Binomial name
- Fusarium verticillioides (Sacc.) Nirenberg (1976)

Synonyms
- Oospora verticillioides Sacc. (1881); Alysidium verticillioides (Sacc.) Kuntze (1898); Alysidium verticilliodes (Sacc.) Kuntze (1898); Fusarium moniliforme J. Sheld. (1904); Fusarium celosiae Abe (1928); Oospora cephalosporioides Luchetti & Favilli (1938)

= Fusarium verticillioides =

Fungus that harms maize/corn

Fusarium verticillioides is the most commonly reported fungal species infecting maize (Zea mays). Fusarium verticillioides is the accepted name of the species, which was also known as Fusarium moniliforme. The species has also been described as mating population A of the Fusarium fujikuroi species complex (formally known as Gibberella fujikuroi species complex). F. verticllioides produces the mutagenic chemical compound fusarin C. F. verticillioides produces a group of disease-causing mycotoxins—fumonisins—on infected kernels.
