= List of Curvularia species =

List of fungus species in the genus Curvularia

This is a list of the fungus species in the genus Curvularia. Many are plant pathogens. As of 2023 August 8, the GBIF lists up to 164 species, while Species Fungorum lists about 196 species. Species Fungorum list is used for this list.

== A ==
- Curvularia affinis Boedijn (1933)
- Curvularia ahvazensis Mehr.-Koushk. & Babaahm. (2018)
- Curvularia akaii Tsuda & Ueyama (1985)
- Curvularia alcornii Manamgoda, L. Cai & K.D. Hyde (2012)
- Curvularia americana K.C. Cunha, Madrid, Gené & Cano (2014)
- Curvularia andropogonis (Zimm.) Boedijn (1933)
- Curvularia angsiewkeeae Y.P. Tan (2021)
- Curvularia annellidiconidiophora M. Raza, K.D. Hyde & L. Cai (2019)
- Curvularia arcana Hern.-Restr. & Y. Marín (2020)
- Curvularia asiatica Manamgoda, L. Cai & K.D. Hyde (2012)
- Curvularia australiensis (Bugnic. ex M.B. Ellis) Manamgoda, L. Cai & K.D. Hyde (2012)
- Curvularia australis (Alcorn) Y.P. Tan & R.G. Shivas (2014)
- Curvularia austriaca Y. Marín & Crous (2020)

== B ==
- Curvularia bannonii Morgan-Jones (1988)
- Curvularia beasleyi Y.P. Tan & R.G. Shivas (2018)
- Curvularia beerburrumensis Y.P. Tan & R.G. Shivas (2018)
- Curvularia boeremae (A.S. Patil & V.G. Rao) Y.P. Tan & R.G. Shivas (2018)
- Curvularia borreriae (Viégas) M.B. Ellis (1966)
- Curvularia bothriochloae Sivan., Alcorn & R.G. Shivas (2003)
- Curvularia brachyspora Boedijn (1933)
- Curvularia brassicae M. Mohan & Mukerji (1979)
- Curvularia buchloes (Lefebvre & Aar.G. Johnson) Manamgoda, Rossman & K.D. Hyde (2014)

== C ==
- Curvularia cactivora (Petr.) Y. Marín & Crous (2020)
- Curvularia canadensis Y. Marín & Crous (2020)
- Curvularia capsici (Hiroë & N. Watan.) Munt.-Cvetk. (1957)
- Curvularia caricae-papayae H.P. Srivast. & Bilgrami (1963)
- Curvularia catenulata S.M. Reddy & Bilgrami (1968)
- Curvularia chiangmaiensis Y. Marín, Senwanna & Crous (2017)
- Curvularia chlamydospora Madrid, K.C. Cunha, Gené & Guarro (2014)
- Curvularia chochrjakovii Gornostaĭ (1976)
- Curvularia chonburiensis Tibpromma & K.D. Hyde (2018)
- Curvularia chuasooengiae Y.P. Tan (2021)
- Curvularia clavata B.L. Jain (1962)
- Curvularia coatesiae Y.P. Tan & R.G. Shivas (2018)
- Curvularia coicicola Meng Zhang & T.Y. Zhang (2004)
- Curvularia coicis E. Castell. (1956)
- Curvularia coimbatorensis N. Kiss & Kocsubé (2020)
- Curvularia colbranii Y.P. Tan & R.G. Shivas (2018)
- Curvularia comoriensis Bouriquet & Jauffret ex M.B. Ellis (1966)
- Curvularia crepinii (Westend.) Boedijn (1933)
- Curvularia crustacea (Henn.) Y.P. Tan & R.G. Shivas (2014)
- Curvularia curculiginis Meng Zhang & T.Y. Zhang (2003)
- Curvularia cylindrica Meng Zhang & T.Y. Zhang (2005)
- Curvularia cymbopogonis (C.W. Dodge) J.W. Groves & Skolko (1945)

== D ==
- Curvularia dactyloctenii (Alcorn) Y.P. Tan & R.G. Shivas (2014)
- Curvularia dactylocteniicola Y. Marín, Senwanna & Crous (2017)
- Curvularia deightonii M.B. Ellis (1966)
- Curvularia desmodii Bharadwaj (1969)
- Curvularia determinata M. Raza, K.D. Hyde & L. Cai (2019)

== E ==
- Curvularia eleusinicola Ferdinandez, Manamgoda & Udayanga (2021)
- Curvularia elliptica Y.L. Zhang, Meng Zhang & T.Y. Zhang (2014)
- Curvularia elliptiformis M. Raza, K.D. Hyde & L. Cai (2019)
- Curvularia ellisii Y. Marín & Crous (2020)
- Curvularia eragrostidicola Y.P. Tan & R.G. Shivas (2018)
- Curvularia eragrostidis (Henn.) J.A. Mey. (1959)

== F ==
- Curvularia falcata (Tehon) Boedijn (1933)
- Curvularia fallax Boedijn (1933)
- Curvularia falsilunata M. Raza, K.D. Hyde & L. Cai (2019)
- Curvularia fimicola Faurel & Schotter (1966)
- Curvularia flexuosa M. Raza, K.D. Hyde & L. Cai (2019)
- Curvularia frankliniae Y.P. Tan & R.G. Shivas (2021)

== G ==
- Curvularia gladioli Boerema & Hamers (1989)
- Curvularia graminicola Alcorn (1998)
- Curvularia graminis Meng Zhang & T.Y. Zhang (2007)
- Curvularia guangxiensis M. Raza, K.D. Hyde & L. Cai (2019)
- Curvularia gudauskasii Morgan-Jones & Karr (1976)

== H ==
- Curvularia harveyi Shipton (1966)
- Curvularia hawaiiensis (Bugnic. ex M.B. Ellis) Manamgoda, L. Cai & K.D. Hyde (2012)
- Curvularia heteropogonis Alcorn (1990)
- Curvularia hexamera Vegh & Benoit (1974)
- Curvularia hominis K.C. Cunha, Madrid, Gené & Cano (2014)
- Curvularia homomorpha (Luttr. & Rogerson) Y.P. Tan & R.G. Shivas (2014)
- Curvularia hubeiensis Y.L. Jiang & T.Y. Zhang (2007)
- Curvularia hustoniae Y.P. Tan (2021)

== I ==
- Curvularia inaequalis (Shear) Boedijn (1933)
- Curvularia indica Subram. (1953)
- Curvularia intermedia Boedijn (1933)
- Curvularia iranica Mehrabi-Koushki, Safi & Farokhinejad (2020)
- Curvularia ischaemi McKenzie (1981)

== J ==
- Curvularia joliotcurieae Y.P. Tan, Bishop-Hurley, R.G. Shivas (2023)

== K ==
- Curvularia kenpeggii Y.P. Tan & R.G. Shivas (2018)
- Curvularia khuzestanica M. Mehrabi, Khodadadi & Farokhin. (2019)
- Curvularia kusanoi (Y. Nisik.) Manamgoda, Rossman & K.D. Hyde (2014)

== L ==
- Curvularia lamingtonensis Y.P. Tan & R.G. Shivas (2018)
- Curvularia lolii Victoria-Arellano, Guatimosim & Dallagnol (2021)
- Curvularia lunata (Wakker) Boedijn (1933)
- Curvularia lycopersici Tandon & Kakkar (1964)

== M ==
- Curvularia malina Tom.-Pet. & Y.K. Jo (2016)
- Curvularia manamgodae M. Raza, K.D. Hyde & L. Cai (2019)
- Curvularia martyniicola Sham. Kumar & Raghv. Singh (2018)
- Curvularia matsushimae Tsuda (2003)
- Curvularia mebaldsii Y.P. Tan & R.G. Shivas (2018)
- Curvularia micrairae Sivan., Alcorn & R.G. Shivas (2003)
- Curvularia micropus (Drechsler) Hern.-Restr., Y.P. Tan & Crous (2018)
- Curvularia microspora Y. Liang, K.D. Hyde, J. Bhat & Yong Wang bis (2018)
- Curvularia miyakei (Y. Nisik.) Manamgoda, Rossman & K.D. Hyde (2014)
- Curvularia moringae Crous (2020)
- Curvularia mosaddeghii Mehr.-Koushk. & Farokhinejad (2018)
- Curvularia muehlenbeckiae Madrid, K.C. Cunha, Gené, Guarro & Crous (2014)

== N ==
- Curvularia nanningensis Qian Zhang, K.D. Hyde & Yong Wang bis (2020)
- Curvularia neergaardii (Danquah) Y.P. Tan & R.G. Shivas (2014)
- Curvularia neoindica Manamgoda, Rossman & K.D. Hyde (2014)
- Curvularia nicotiae (Mouch.) Y.P. Tan & R.G. Shivas (2014)
- Curvularia nodosa Y. Marín, Cheew. & Crous (2017)
- Curvularia nodulosa (Sacc.) Manamgoda, Rossman & K.D. Hyde (2014)

== O ==
- Curvularia ocimi Rashmi Dubey & A.K. Pandey bis (2011)
- Curvularia oryzae Bugnic. (1950)
- Curvularia oryzae-sativae Sivan. (1987)
- Curvularia ovariicola (Alcorn) Manamgoda, L. Cai & K.D. Hyde (2012)
- Curvularia ovoidea (Hiroë) Munt.-Cvetk. (1957)

== P ==
- Curvularia pallescens Boedijn (1933)
- Curvularia palmarum Subram. (1953)
- Curvularia palmicola Jun F. Li, Phook. & K.D. Hyde (2017)
- Curvularia pandanicola Tibpromma & K.D. Hyde (2018)
- Curvularia panici W.H. Chung & Tsukib. (2005)
- Curvularia panici-maximi Ferdinandez, Manamgoda & Udayanga (2021)
- Curvularia paraverruculosa Iturrieta-González, Gené & Dania García (2020)
- Curvularia patereae (M.R. Carranza) Y. Marín, Hern.-Restr. & Crous (2020)
- Curvularia penniseti (Mitra) Boedijn (1933)
- Curvularia perotidis (Alcorn) Manamgoda, L. Cai & K.D. Hyde (2012)
- Curvularia petersonii Y.P. Tan & R.G. Shivas (2018)
- Curvularia phaeospora M. Raza, K.D. Hyde & L. Cai (2019)
- Curvularia pilae Toro (1946)
- Curvularia pisi Y. Marín & Crous (2017)
- Curvularia plantarum M. Raza, K.D. Hyde & L. Cai (2019)
- Curvularia platzii Y.P. Tan & R.G. Shivas (2018)
- Curvularia polytrata M. Raza, K.D. Hyde & L. Cai (2019)
- Curvularia portulacae (Rader) Y.P. Tan & R.G. Shivas (2014)
- Curvularia prasadii R.L. Mathur & B.L. Mathur (1959)
- Curvularia protuberans M. Raza, K.D. Hyde & L. Cai (2019)
- Curvularia protuberata R.R. Nelson & Hodges (1965)
- Curvularia pseudobrachyspora Y. Marín, Cheew. & Crous (2017)
- Curvularia pseudoclavata Y. Marín & Crous (2020)
- Curvularia pseudoellisii Y. Marín & Crous (2020)
- Curvularia pseudointermedia Y. Marín & Crous (2020)
- Curvularia pseudolunata K.C. Cunha, Madrid & Gené (2014)
- Curvularia pseudoprotuberata Y. Marín & Crous (2020)
- Curvularia pseudorobusta Meng Zhang & T.Y. Zhang (2007)

== Q ==
- Curvularia queenslandica Sivan., Alcorn & R.G. Shivas (2003)

== R ==
- Curvularia radicicola M. Raza, K.D. Hyde & L. Cai (2019)
- Curvularia radicifoliigena M. Raza, K.D. Hyde & L. Cai (2019)
- Curvularia ramosa (Bainier) Boedijn (1933)
- Curvularia ravenelii (M.A. Curtis ex Berk.) Manamgoda, L. Cai & K.D. Hyde (2012)
- Curvularia reesii Y.P. Tan & R.G. Shivas (2018)
- Curvularia ribaldii (Corbetta) Tsuda (2003)
- Curvularia richardiae Alcorn (1971)
- Curvularia robusta Kilp. & Luttr. (1967)
- Curvularia rouhanii Mehr.-Koushk. & Babaahm. (2018)
- Curvularia ryleyi Y.P. Tan & R.G. Shivas (2014)

== S ==
- Curvularia saccharicola M. Raza, K.D. Hyde & L. Cai (2019)
- Curvularia sacchari-officinarum M. Raza, K.D. Hyde & L. Cai (2019)
- Curvularia senegalensis (Speg.) Subram. (1956)
- Curvularia sesuvii (Jing Z. Zhang) Manamgoda, Rossman & K.D. Hyde (2014)
- Curvularia shahidchamranensis Mehrabi-Koushki (2018)
- Curvularia sichuanensis Meng Zhang & T.Y. Zhang (2007)
- Curvularia siddiquii Y. Marín & Crous (2020)
- Curvularia simmonsii Ferdinandez, Manamgoda & Udayanga (2021)
- Curvularia sociata (Ellis & Everh.) Morgan-Jones & W.B. Kendr. (1972)
- Curvularia soli Y. Marín & Crous (2017)
- Curvularia sorghicola (Sivan.) Madrid & Crous (2018)
- Curvularia sorghina R.G. Shivas & Sivan. (1987)
- Curvularia spicata (Bainier) Boedijn (1933)
- Curvularia spicifera (Bainier) Boedijn (1933)
- Curvularia spinosa H.P. Srivast. & Bilgrami (1963)
- Curvularia sporobolicola Y.P. Tan & R.G. Shivas (2018)
- Curvularia stapeliae (du Plessis) S. Hughes & du Plessis (1951)
- Curvularia stenotaphri N.T. Tran, Geering, Y.P. Tan & R.G. Shivas (2021)
- Curvularia subpallescens J.J. Xu & T.Y. Zhang (2006)
- Curvularia subpapendorfii (Mouch.) Manamgoda, Rossman & K.D. Hyde (2014)
- Curvularia subulata (Nees & T. Nees) Boedijn ex J.C. Gilman (1945)
- Curvularia sudanensis (Gonz. Frag. & Cif.) Castell. (1952)
- Curvularia suttoniae Iturrieta-González, Wiederhold, Gené & Dania García (2020)

== T ==
- Curvularia tamilnaduensis N. Kiss & Kocsubé (2020)
- Curvularia tanzanica Y.P. Tan, Dhileepan, Ntandu, Kurose & R.G. Shivas (2021)
- Curvularia templetoniae Y.P. Tan (2021)
- Curvularia thailandica Tibpromma & K.D. Hyde (2018)
- Curvularia tomato (Ellis & Barthol.) Munt.-Cvetk. (1957)
- Curvularia trachycarpi Meng Zhang & T.Y. Zhang (2005)
- Curvularia tremae Haldar (2017)
- Curvularia tribuli Hern.-Restr. & Y. Marín (2020)
- Curvularia trifolii (Kauffman) Boedijn (1933)
- Curvularia tripogonis (A.S. Patil & V.G. Rao) Manamgoda, L. Cai & K.D. Hyde (2012)
- Curvularia tritici S.M. Kumar & Nema (1969)
- Curvularia tropicalis (Sivan.) Y.P. Tan & R.G. Shivas (2014)
- Curvularia tsudae H. Deng, Y.P. Tan & R.G. Shivas (2014)
- Curvularia tuberculata B.L. Jain (1962)

== U ==
- Curvularia umbiliciformis M. Raza, K.D. Hyde & L. Cai (2019)
- Curvularia uncinata Bugnic. (1950)
- Curvularia unicolorospora J.M. Yen (1980)

== V ==
- Curvularia variabilis Y. Marín, Senwanna & Crous (2017)
- Curvularia verruciformis G.P. Agarwal & V.P. Sahni (1963)
- Curvularia verrucosa Sivan. (1992)
- Curvularia verruculosa Tandon & Bilgrami ex M.B. Ellis (1966)
- Curvularia vietnamensis Iturrieta-González, Gené & Dania García (2020)

== W ==
- Curvularia warraberensis Y.P. Tan & R.G. Shivas (2018)

== X ==
- Curvularia xishuangbannaensis Tibpromma & K.D. Hyde (2018)

== Former species ==
As listed by Species Fungorum (all are family Pleosporaceae, unless stated);

- C. aeria (Bat., J.A. Lima & C.T. Vasconc.) Tsuda (1994) = Curvularia lunata
- C. akaiiensis Sivan. (1987) = Cochliobolus akaiiensis
- C. caryopsidum (Sacc.) Teng (1964) = Curvularia lunata
- C. cesatii (Mont.) Boedijn (1933) = Endophragmiella cesatii, Sordariomycetidae
- C. coicis Matsush. (1975) = Curvularia matsushimae
- C. crassiseptata Meng Zhang & T.Y. Zhang (2004) = Exserohilum inaequale
- C. crassiseptata var. lactucae Meng Zhang & T.Y. Zhang (2004) = Exserohilum inaequale
- C. ellisii S.I. Ahmed & M. Qureshi (1960) = Drechslera ellisii
- C. geniculata (Tracy & Earle) Boedijn (1933) = Cochliobolus geniculatus
- C. geniculata var. eleocharidis Cif. (1962) = Cochliobolus geniculatus
- C. heteropogonicola (Sivan.) Alcorn (1991) = Exserohilum heteropogonicola
- C. interseminata (Berk. & Ravenel) J.C. Gilman (1945) = Dendryphion vinosum, Torulaceae
- C. irregularis (Cralley & Tullis) Hara (1959) = Nakataea oryzae, Magnaporthaceae
- C. leonensis M.B. Ellis (1966) = Curvularia pallescens
- C. lunata var. aeria (Bat., J.A. Lima & C.T. Vasconc.) M.B. Ellis (1966) = Curvularia lunata
- C. maculans (C.K. Bancr.) Boedijn (1933) = Curvularia eragrostidis
- C. oryzae (S. Ito & Ishiy.) Hara (1959) = Brachysporium oryzae, Trichosphaeriaceae
- C. papendorfii Aa (1967) = Bipolaris papendorfii
- C. penniseti var. sorghi P.L. Patil, N.B. Kulk. & B.C. Patil (1966) = Curvularia penniseti
- C. siddiquii S.I. Ahmed & M. Qureshi (1960) = Bipolaris papendorfii
- C. sigmoidea (Cavara) Hara (1959) = Nakataea oryzae, Magnaporthaceae
- C. tetramera (McKinney) Boedijn ex J.C. Gilman (1945) = Curvularia spicifera
- C. trifolii f. gladioli Parmelee & Luttr. (1954) = Curvularia trifolii
- C. verruciformis var. cucurbita Meng Zhang & T.Y. Zhang (2007) = Curvularia verruciformis
- C. verruciformis var. magneta D.P. Tiwari & P.D. Agrawal (1972) = Curvularia verruciformis
