= List of foliage plant diseases (Commelinaceae) =

This is a list of diseases of foliage plants belonging to the family Commelinaceae.

== Plant Species ==
Plant species
A	Aneilema aequinoctiale	clinging aneilema
C	Commelina spp.	
G	Gibasis spp.	
M	Murdannia nudiflora	
R	Tradescantia spathacea	oyster plant
S	Siderasis fuscata	
Ti	Tinantia erecta	
Tr	Tradescantia spp.	Spiderworts (wandering Jew and others)
Z	Tradescantia zebrina	wandering Jew

== Fungal diseases ==
Fungal diseases
Common name	Scientific name	Plants affected
Pythium root rot	Pythium spp.	R
Tan leaf spot	Curvularia eragrostidis = Pseudocochliobolus eragrostidis Cochliobolus eragrostidis [teleomorph]	R, T

== Nematodes, parasitic ==
Nematodes, parasitic
Common name	Scientific name	Plants affected
Root-knot (nematode) (also called leaf gall)	Meloidogyne incognita	S

== Viral diseases ==
Viral diseases
Common/species name	Genus name	Plants affected
Aneilema virus (AV)	Potyvirus	A, C, M, Ti
Brome mosaic virus (BMV)	Bromovirus	C
Clover yellow vein virus (CYVV)	Potyvirus	G, T, Ti
Commelina mosaic virus (CoMV)	Potyvirus	C, R
Cucumber mosaic virus (CMV)	Cucumovirus	C, M
Tobacco mild green mosaic virus (TMGMV = U2-TMV)	Tobamovirus	R
Tobacco mosaic virus (TMV = U1-TMV)	Tobamovirus	R
Tomato mosaic virus (ToMV)	Tobamovirus	R, T
Tradescantia mosaic virus (TZV)	Potyvirus	C, G, R, T, Z
