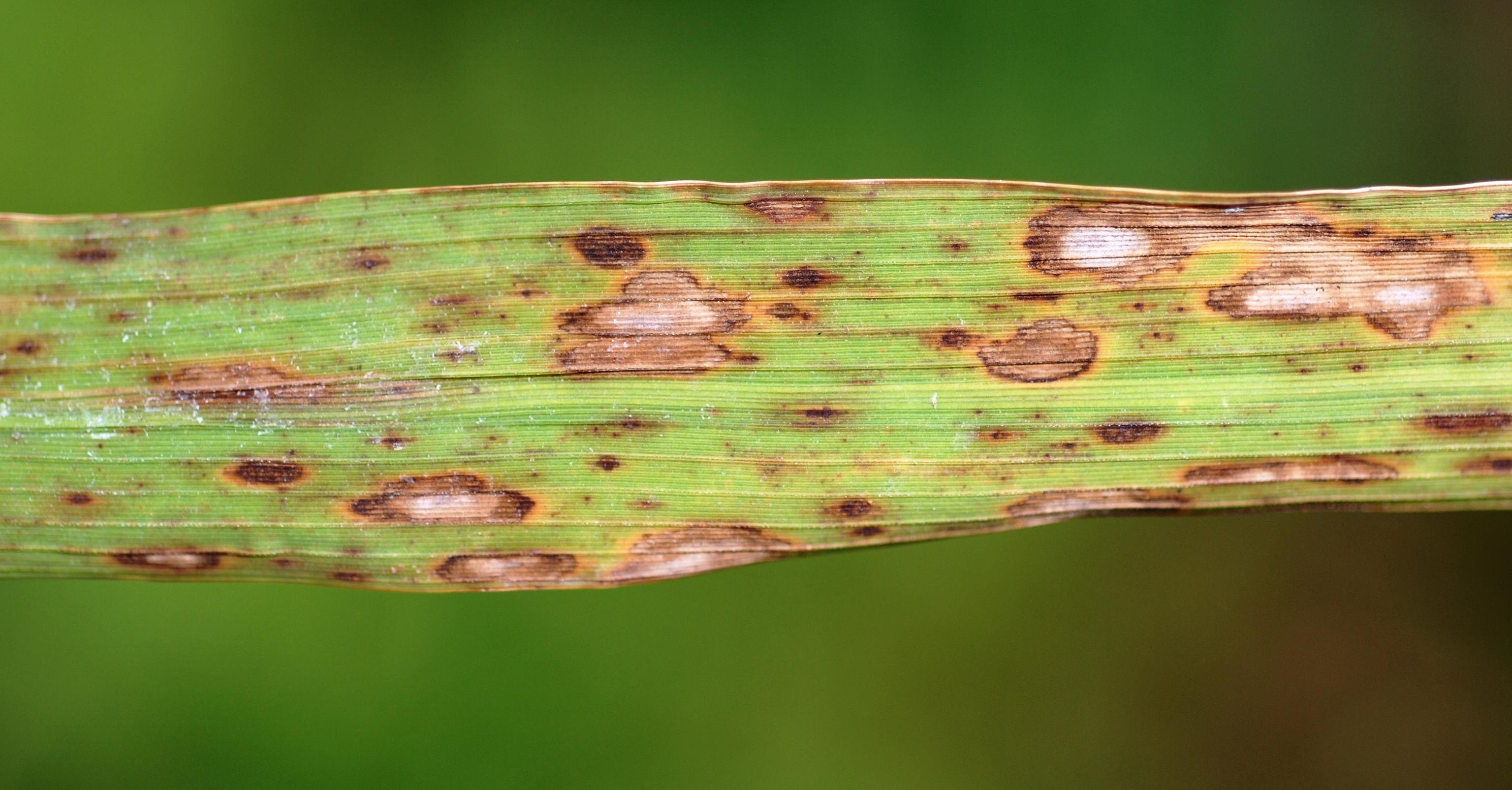
- Symptoms of Cochliobolus miyabeanus, the causal agent of brown spot, on rice

Scientific classification
- Kingdom: Fungi
- Division: Ascomycota
- Class: Dothideomycetes
- Order: Pleosporales
- Family: Pleosporaceae
- Genus: Cochliobolus; Drechsler

Type species
- Cochliobolus heterostrophus (Drechsler) Drechslera

= Cochliobolus =

Genus of fungi

The fungal genus Cochliobolus includes 19 species, it includes some plant pathogenic species such as Cochliobolus heterostrophus. A lot of former Cochliobolus species were transferred to either Curvularia or Bipolaris genera.

Cochliobolus heterostrophus is known from "southern corn blight" which affects corn and maize.

== Heterothallism and homothallism ==
Those fungi that need a partner to mate are referred to as heterothallic (self-sterile), and those fungi not needing a partner are referred to as homothallic (self-fertile). A study of DNA sequences of mating type loci from different heterothallic and homothallic species in the genus Cochliobolus suggests that homothallism can be derived from heterothallism by recombination.

== Species ==
As accepted by Species Fungorum;

- Cochliobolus akaii (Tsuda & Ueyama) Sivan. (1987)
- Cochliobolus akaiiensis Sivan. (1987)
- Cochliobolus bicolor A.R. Paul & Parbery (1966)
- Cochliobolus boutelouae R. Sprague (1951)
- Cochliobolus buteae S.D. Patil & C. Ramesh (1986)
- Cochliobolus eleusines Alcorn (1990)
- Cochliobolus geniculatus R.R. Nelson (1964)
- Cochliobolus heliconiae Alcorn (1996)
- Cochliobolus heterostrophus (Drechsler) Drechsler (1934)
- Cochliobolus heveicola Tsukib. & W.H. Chung (2005)
- Cochliobolus luttrellii Alcorn (1990)
- Cochliobolus miakei I. Hino & Katum. (1966)
- Cochliobolus neergaardii Alcorn (1990)
- Cochliobolus ovariicola Alcorn (1990)
- Cochliobolus palmivora P.N. Rao & Chaudhury (1964)
- Cochliobolus sasae I. Hino & Katum. (1960)
- Cochliobolus setariae (S. Ito & Kurib.) Drechsler ex Dastur (1942)
- Cochliobolus sitharamii S.M. Reddy (1977)
- Cochliobolus sporoboli E. Castell. (1951)
- Cochliobolus tritici Dastur (1942)

Former species (all within Pleosporaceae family);

- C. aberrans Alcorn (1990) = Johnalcornia aberrans
- C. australiensis (Tsuda & Ueyama) Alcorn (1983) = Curvularia tsudae
- C. carbonum R.R. Nelson (1959) = Bipolaris zeicola
- C. chloridis Alcorn (1978) = Bipolaris chloridis
- C. cymbopogonis J.A. Hall & Sivan. (1972) = Curvularia cymbopogonis
- C. cynodontis R.R. Nelson (1964) = Bipolaris cynodontis
- C. dactyloctenii Alcorn (1982) = Curvularia dactyloctenii
- C. ellisii Alcorn (1983) = Drechslera ellisii
- C. eragrostidis (Tsuda & Ueyama) Sivan. (1987) = Curvularia eragrostidis
- C. graminicola Alcorn (1998) = Curvularia graminicola
- C. hawaiiensis Alcorn (1978) = Curvularia hawaiiensis
- C. heteropogonis Alcorn (1990) = Curvularia heteropogonis
- C. kusanoi (Y. Nisik.) Drechsler ex Dastur (1942) = Curvularia kusanoi
- C. lunatus R.R. Nelson & F.A. Haasis (1964) = Curvularia lunata
- C. melinidis Alcorn (1982) = Bipolaris melinidis
- C. microlaenae Alcorn (1990) = Bipolaris microlaenae
- C. miyabeanus (S. Ito & Kurib.) Drechsler ex Dastur (1942) = Bipolaris oryzae
- C. nisikadoi (Tsuda, Ueyama & Nishih.) Alcorn (1983) = Curvularia coicis
- C. nodulosus Luttr. (1957) = Curvularia nodulosa
- C. pallescens (Tsuda & Ueyama) Sivan. (1987) = Curvularia pallescens
- C. peregianensis Alcorn (1982) = Bipolaris peregianensis
- C. perotidis Alcorn (1982) = Curvularia perotidis
- C. ravenelii Alcorn (1981) = Curvularia ravenelii
- C. sativus (S. Ito & Kurib.) Drechsler ex Dastur (1942) = Bipolaris sorokiniana
- C. spicifer R.R. Nelson (1964) = Curvularia spicifera
- C. stenospilus T. Matsumoto & W. Yamam. (1936) = Bipolaris stenospila
- C. tripogonis Alcorn (1981) = Curvularia tripogonis
- C. tuberculatus Sivan. (1985) = Curvularia tuberculata
- C. verruculosus (Tsuda & Ueyama) Sivan. (1984) = Curvularia verruculosa
- C. victoriae R.R. Nelson (1960) = Bipolaris victoriae
- C. zeae H.S. Chang (1992) = Bipolaris zeae

== See also ==
- Phytopathology
