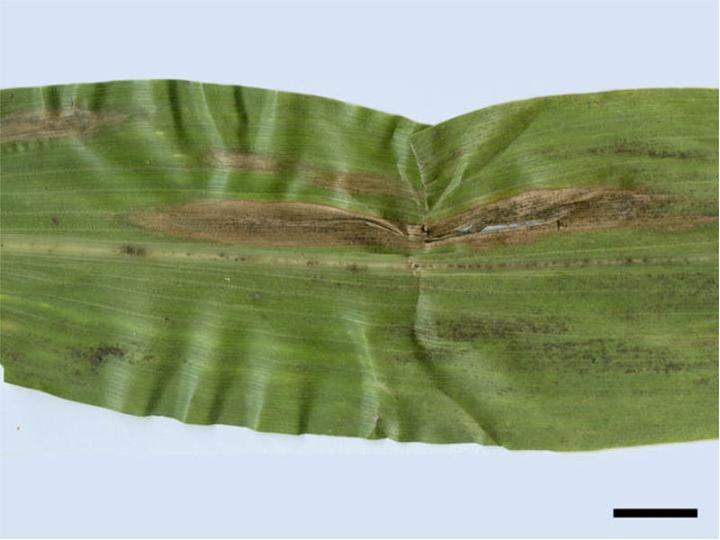
- Exserohilum turcicum on corn leaf

Scientific classification
- Domain: Eukaryota
- Kingdom: Fungi
- Division: Ascomycota
- Class: Dothideomycetes
- Order: Pleosporales
- Family: Pleosporaceae
- Genus: Exserohilum; K.J.Leonard & Suggs (1974)

Type species
- Exserohilum turcicum (Pass.) K.J.Leonard & Suggs (1974)

= Exserohilum =

Genus of fungi

Exserohilum is a genus of fungi in the family Pleosporaceae. The Exserohilum species are known for causing blight and human immune system diseases. The sexual reproductive (or ascigerous) states of Exserohilum species are known as Setosphaeria. The type species is Exserohilum turcicum. This genus is among three dematiaceous that are categorized for containing pathogens leading to diseases like phaeohyphomycosis.

== Morphology ==
Exserohilum is an asexual organism that reproduces through spores. These one-celled reproductive units are concave and can be seen in the suspensor.

== Taxonomy ==
Exserohilum was circumscribed by K. Leonard and Edna Suggs in 1974 to contain species formerly placed in Bipolaris with distinctly protruding hila. Exsero which means stretch out and hilum which refers to the part of the organism. The truncate hila or hilum, protrudes from its distinct conidia which are ellipsoidal and distoseptate (forming a layer).

Colonies of Exserohilum range from the color grey to blackish-brown. The texture varies from suede-like to floccose in texture. The species also have an olivaceous to black reverse. The conidia from which the hilum extends, are either straight, curved, slightly bent or ellipsoidal to fusiform. and are formed on the top through a pore (poroconidia) on an elongated sympodial angled conidiophore. The strong, protruding truncate hilum and the septum above is normally thick and dark. The end cells are paler and the walls finely roughened. The conidial germination of Exserohilum is bipolar.

== Habitat and distribution ==
Exserohilum has a cosmopolitan distribution, with its species found naturally in warm, tropical, and subtropical locations. They live on plant material like grasses, rotten wood and in the soil.

== Species ==
As of October 2015, Index Fungorum lists 26 valid species of Exserohilum:

- Exserohilum antillanum R.F.Castañeda, Guarro & Cano 1995 – Cuba
- Exserohilum curvatum Sivan. & Muthaiyan 1984 – Venezuela
- Exserohilum curvisporum Sivan., Abdullah & B.A.Abbas 1993 – Iraq
- Exserohilum echinochloae Sivan. 1984 – Bangladesh
- Exserohilum frumentacei (Mitra) K.J.Leonard & Suggs 1974 – Andhra Pradesh; Bihar; Botswana; Ethiopia; Sabah
- Exserohilum fusiforme Alcorn 1991 – Queensland
- Exserohilum gedarefense (El Shafie) Alcorn 1983 – Egypt; Sudan
- Exserohilum heteromorphum G.Y.Sun 2005
- Exserohilum heteropogonicola Sivan. 1984 – Colombia; Uttaranchal
- Exserohilum inaequale Sivan. 1984 – Nigeria
- Exserohilum israeli Steiman, Guiraud, Seigle-Mur. & Sage 2000 – Israel
- Exserohilum longirostratum (Subram.) Sivan. 1984 – Andhra Pradesh; Florida; France; Haryana; Madhya Pradesh; Nigeria; Northern Territory; Puerto Rico; Rajasthan; Sudan; Uttar Pradesh; Zambia
- Exserohilum longisporum G.Y.Sun 1997 – China
- Exserohilum mcginnisii A.A.Padhye & Ajello 1986
- Exserohilum minor Alcorn 1986
- Exserohilum neoregeliae Sakoda & Tsukib. 2011
- Exserohilum oryzae Sivan. 1987 – Macedonia
- Exserohilum oryzicola Sivan. 1984
- Exserohilum oryzinum Sivan. 1984 – Egypt
- Exserohilum parlierense W.Q.Chen & Michailides 2002
- Exserohilum paspali J.J.Muchovej & Nesio 1987 – Minas Gerais
- Exserohilum phragmitis W.P.Wu 1990
- Exserohilum protrudens Alcorn 1988
- Exserohilum psidii Sivan. 1992 – Andhra Pradesh
- Exserohilum sodomii Guiraud, Steiman, Seigle-Mur. & Sage 1997 – Israel
- Exserohilum sorghicola Sivan. 1987 – Ethiopia

== Clinical significance ==
Infection cases caused by exposure to Exserohilum are rare, but it's the most well studied detail of the fungi. The three species of Exserohilum that are identified as human pathogens are: Exserohilum rostratum, Exserohilum longirostratum and Exserohilum mcginnisii. Prevailing infections include sinusitis, skin infection and in some rare cases, cerebral abscesses, keratitis, osteomyelitis, prothetic valve endocarditis, and disseminated infection. Reports of human infection by Exserohilum mainly come from warm, tropical and subtropical locations such as southern United States, India, and Israel.
