= C. trifolii =

C. trifolii may refer to:

- Coleophora trifolii, the trefoil thick-horned tinea or large clover case-bearer, a moth species found in Europe, North Africa, Asia Minor, Afghanistan and North America
- Colletotrichum trifolii, a fungal plant pathogen of alfalfa
- Curvularia trifolii, a plant pathogen
- Cymadothea trifolii, a fungal plant pathogen
