= Curvularia inaequalis =

Scientific classification
- Kingdom: Fungi
- Division: Ascomycota
- Class: Dothideomycetes
- Order: Pleosporales
- Family: Pleosporaceae
- Genus: Curvularia
- Species: C. inaequalis

Binomial name
- Curvularia inaequalis (Shear) Boedijn (1907)

Synonyms
- Helminthosporium inaequale Shear (1907); Acrothecium arenarium Moreau & V. Moreau (1941)

Species of fungus

Curvularia inaequalis is a plant saprobe that resides in temperate and subtropical environments. It is commonly found in the soils of forage grasses and grains. The species has been observed in a broad distribution of countries including Turkey, France, Canada, The United States, Japan and India. This species is dematiaceous and a hyphomycete.

== History and taxonomy ==
The Curvularia genus can be identified by its spiral borne phaeophragmospores, which contain both hyaline end cells and disproportionately large cells. They possess conidia with differing curvature and number of septa. C. inaequalis was first described in 1907 by ecologist Cornelius Lott Shear. The fungus was isolated from diseased New Jersey cranberry pulp and termed Helminthosporium inaequale. Later, during Karl Boedijin's taxonomic organization and grouping of this genus, he recognized a similarity between them and H. inaequale. He recognized a morphological similarity between its conidia and those of the lunata group within Curvularia, and so renamed it C. inaequalis. Recognition of the three-septate curved conidia motivated the introduction of the now popularized name.

== Growth and morphology ==
The species' spore producing cells take on a model of sympodial growth. Conidia grow through successive apices which end in a terminal prospore. Growth can be affected by static magnetic fields with field flux densities. Under these conditions, the number of conidia are able to increase by a minimum of 68 percent.

Curvularia inaequalis is a filamentous fungus, with 3 to 12 densely packed filaments. The species is mostly brown in appearance, with pale brown end cells. Conidia themselves, consist of 3-5 cells with thick cell walls and a larger central cell. The diameter of the conidia ranges from 10 to 30 micrometers and have a slight leading curvature. Overall the appearance of the species is described as looking "cottony" with clear branching cells.

The species can be difficult to identify due to its similar appearance to both C. and geniculate. Instead, sequencing of nuclear rRNA internal transcribed spacer regions (ITS) can be done to achieve accurate identification.

== Physiology ==
The optimal growth temperature for the species is 30°C. It is able to produce a multitude of chemical products with enzymatic properties. One enzyme produced is chloroperoxidase, which can catalyze halogenation reactions. Chloroperoxidase secreted from C. inaequalis contains vanadium active site. The presence of the vanadium substrate vanadate is essential for the function of chloroperoxidase. The compound glucose however, acts as an inhibitor for both enzyme function and production. In its active form, the enzyme is able to then produce hypochlorous acid, a strong oxidizing agent. It has been theorized that C. inaequalis utilizes chloroperoxidase and hypochlorous acid in combination to penetrate the host's cell wall.

Other significant compounds produced include of B-galactosidase, 4-hydroxyradianthin and Curvularone A. The species is able to produce large amounts of β-galactosidase, which can hydrolyze lactose in acid whey. C. inaequalis also contains 4-hydroxyradianthin and Curvularone A compounds which have been identified as potential anti-tumor agents.

== Pathology and toxicology ==
=== Plant pathology and toxicology ===
Curvularia inaequalis is known to cause leaf spot, also known as Leaf Blight. Symptoms of infection by C. inaequalis include the combination of oval shaped dark brown patches and leaf tip dieback. The infection slowly spreads causes necrosis until it has covered the entirety of the leaf. It results in the thinning of grass vegetation such as Zoysia-, Bent-, Bermuda- and Buffalo- grasses. Blighting is believed to be caused by two C. inaequalis mycotoxins, Pyrenocines A and B. Pyrenocines A is the more potent of the two, stunting growth and causing necrosis in vegetation. Both cause leaf tip die back in turf grass and leaf leakage of electrolytes in Bermuda grass.

=== Human pathology ===
Curvularia inaequalis is typically a rare human pathogen. There are however, recorded medical cases that mention infection by the species. One such case is of an Eosinophilic fungal rhinosinusitis in an immunocompromised male. Endoscopic sinus surgery was required to remove a large polyposis. C. inaequalis was found to have grown favorably in the eosinophilic mucus. Oral itraconazole and other corticosteroids successfully were administered to prevent reinfection. Another case of C. inaequalis causing disease includes peritonitis in an elderly patient.

It is suggested that contraction of the fungus occurs due to contact with soils. Furthermore, a case of recorded aerosolized C. inaequalis in one Canadian home supports airborne movement of spores as an important mode of transfer. While many cases of infection due to soil contact with the genus Curvularia, connection with the specific species has not yet been confirmed. Further studies are required to determine its human pathogen potential.
