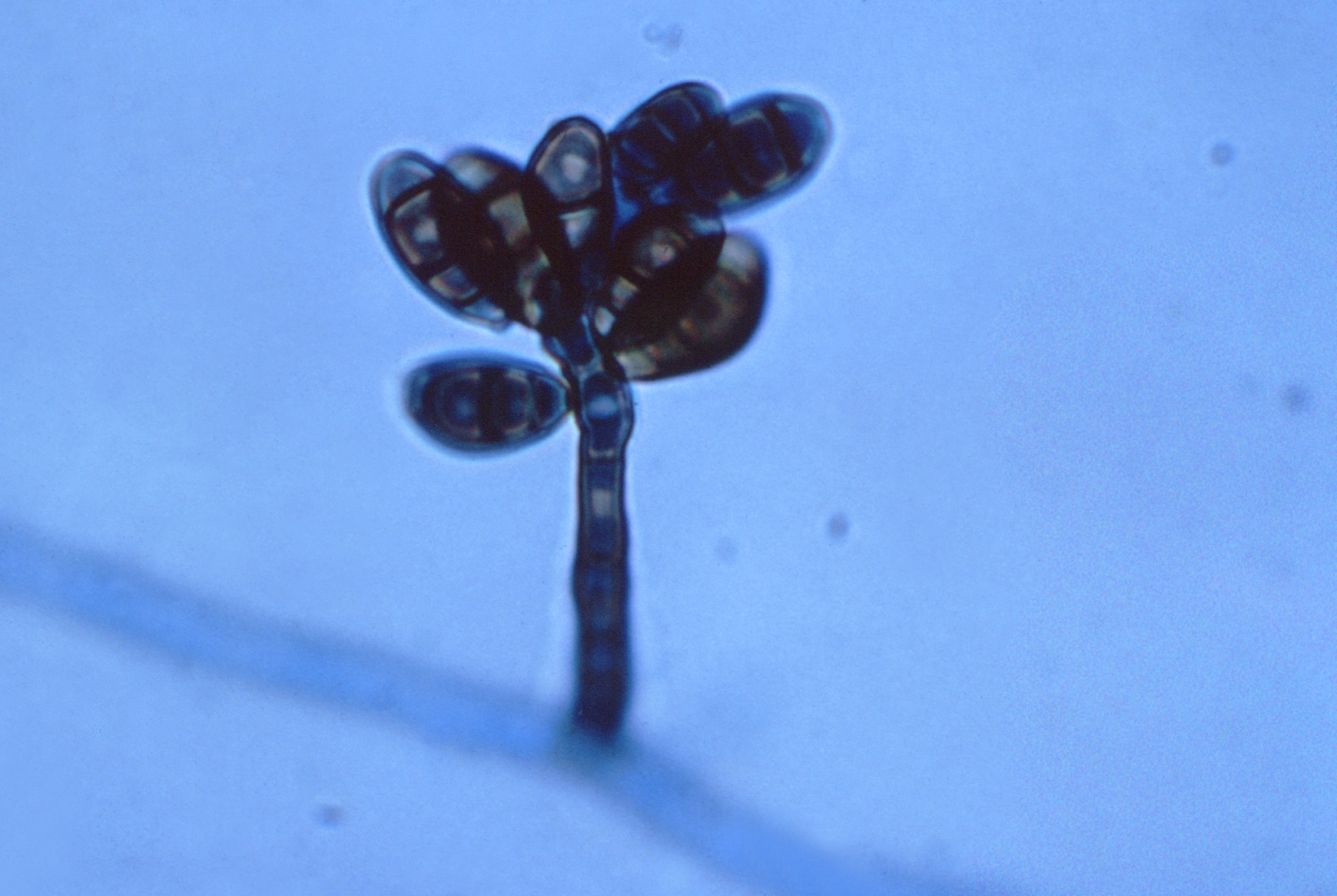
- Conidiophore of Curvularia geniculata

Scientific classification
- Kingdom: Fungi
- Division: Ascomycota
- Class: Dothideomycetes
- Order: Pleosporales
- Family: Pleosporaceae
- Genus: Curvularia
- Species: C. geniculata

Binomial name
- Curvularia geniculata (Tracy & Earle) Boedijn (1923)

Synonyms
- Helminthosporium geniculatum Tracy & Earle (1896); Cochliobolus geniculatus R.R. Nelson (1964); Pseudocochliobolus geniculatus (R.R. Nelson) Tsuda, Ueyama & Nishih (1978)

= Curvularia geniculata =

Species of fungus

Curvularia geniculata is a fast-growing anamorphic fungus in the division Ascomycota, most commonly found in soil, especially in areas of warmer climates. The fungus is a pathogen, mainly causing plant and animal infections, and rarely causing human infections. C. geniculata is characterized by its curved conidia, which has a dark brown centre and pale tapered tips, and produces anti-fungal compounds called Curvularides A-E.

== History and taxonomy ==
The fungus was discovered by American botanist Samuel Mills Tracy and mycologist Franklin Sumner Earle in Starkville, Mississippi 1894 on Love grass (Eragrostis rachitricha) grown from imported seeds. They classified the fungus as Helminthosporium geniculatum; however, the Heliminthosporium species later got segregated into four different genera, one being the genus Curvularia. In 1923, Karel Bernard Boedijn, a Dutch botanist and mycologist, reclassified the fungus as Curvularia geniculata which is the asexual form (anamorph) of the fungus. Associated with C. geniculata is the sexual form (teleomorph), classified first as Cochliobolus geniculatus in 1964 and later reclassified to Pseudocochliobolus geniculatus in 1978 by Richard Robert Nelson.

== Morphology ==
Curvularia geniculata colonies grown on Oxford agar can grow rapidly to 3–5 cm in diameter, with a dark brown and hairy appearance. The fungus produces conidiophores up to 600 μm long, becoming lighter near the tip, and are septate, meaning the structure is subdivided by walls called septa. The conidiophores will produce 4-septate conidia (18–37 x 8–14 μm), consisting of a curved, broad central section that is dark brown and paler tapered ends. C. geniculata can be mistaken for Curvularia lunata because the latter is more commonly found. These two can be distinguished because C. lunata produces 3-septate conidia.

== Growth and physiology ==
The optimal growth temperature for C. geniculata is 24–30 °C (75–86 °F). As a thermotolerant, the fungus can grow up to 37 °C (99 °F), but grows at a slower rate. The culture age (20-, 40-, and 60-day-old) affect the germination rate, germ tube growth and branching in different temperature conditions. Conidia germination was found to increase as temperature increased to 15 °C in all cultures. However, as the temperature reached or passed over 25 °C, germination declined in 40- and 60-day-old cultures, but not in 20-day-old cultures. In all the cultures, germ tube growth and branching increased as the temperature increased to 25 °C, but decreased above 25 °C.

== Habitat and ecology ==
Curvularia geniculata is frequently reported to be found in soil and plants, particularly in warmer areas. The fungus was found to be associated with many plant species within the families Amaranthaceae, Apiaceae, Araceae, Asteraceae, Balsaminaceae, Basellaceae, Brassicaceae, Convolvulaceae, Fabaceae, Gesneriaceae, Marantaceae, Oleaceae, Papaveraceae, Poaceae, Solanacae, Vitaceae and Zingiberaceae. The fungus has been commonly found in Asia (Bangladesh, Bhutan, Brunei, Hong Kong, India, Malaysia, Myanmar, Nepal, Singapore and Thailand), Africa (Nigeria, Seychelles, Sierra Leone, South Africa and Uganda), Europe (USSR and Italy), North America (Bahamas, Canada, Central America, Cuba, Jamaica, Tobago, Trinidad and the USA), Oceania (Australia, Fiji, Papua New Guinea and Solomon Islands) and South America (Brazil, Peru and Venezuela).

== Pathogenicity ==
Curvularia geniculata is most often associated with a wide range of plant species, especially in tropical countries, because it has little host specificity. Not only is this fungus commonly pathogenic to plants, but it is also frequently found in animals and occasionally found in humans. Members of the Curvularia species produce metabolites and toxins, some with anti-fungal properties. C. geniculata produces anti-fungal compounds, Curvularides A-E, which function in cyclic peptide regulation and cell wall degradation. Curvularide B was found to use its anti-fungal properties on Candida albicans, a fungus often associated with HIV patients.

=== Plant infections ===
Curvularia geniculata, a common plant pathogen, colonizes the roots of many plant species. For instance, Witchweed is a plant host of C. geniculata which causes huge crop losses because it parasitizes corn, grain, and many other plant species. Upon germination, the fungus is able to cause infection by penetrating the plant with its infectious pegs called appressorium, allowing the hyphae to grow in and between the host cells, resulting in cell death and leafspots.

=== Animal infections ===
Curvularia geniculata is a frequent animal pathogen that has been found to cause many animal diseases such as sinus infections in cattle, swelling of the skin (subcutaneous tumefactions) of dogs and horses, bone infections (osteomyelitis) in dogs, and central nervous infections in birds. The fungus has been identified as the common causal agent of mycetomata, a chronic fungal infection, which gives rise to pigmented nodules on the body of horses upon traumatic injury. Also, C. geniculata has been reported to cause bovine mycotic abortion in cattle, likely by inhalation or ingestion of the conidia by pregnant cows.

=== Human infections ===
Curvularia geniculata rarely contributes to human disease and has been reported in a few cases of keratitis, inflammatory disease often of the feet (mycetomas), (endocarditis) and peritonitis. The fungus enters into the human body via injury to the eye, colonization of the sinus, penetration of the skin or inhalation. Being exposed for a long period of time and contact with soil are the biggest risk factors of getting infected by C. geniculata.

==== Potential treatments ====
The fungus was found to be susceptible to Ketoconazole and itraconazole anti-fungal drugs in vitro. Patients with C. geniculata-induced peritonitis fully recovered upon treatment with anti-fungal medications, amphotericin B and itraconazole.

== Biotechnology applications ==
Due to industrial activities, mercury is present in the soil which is very toxic and is a possible health hazard to humans and animals. C. geniculata can potentially be used as a method for mercury bioremediation because of its resistant properties to mercury and ability to colonize on plant roots. By colonizing host roots, mercury extracted from the soil can accumulate in the host, reducing the mercury levels in the soil. The fungus was able to remove more than 97% of mercury in vitro.
