= Commelina mosaic virus =

Virus classification
- (unranked): Virus
- Realm: Riboviria
- Kingdom: Orthornavirae
- Phylum: Pisuviricota
- Class: Stelpaviricetes
- Order: Patatavirales
- Family: Potyviridae
- Genus: Potyvirus
- Species: Potyvirus commelinae

Species of virus

Commelina mosaic virus (ComMV) is a plant virus in the genus Potyvirus and the family Potyviridae. Like other members of the Potyvirus genus, ComMV is a monopartite strand of positive-sense, single-stranded RNA surrounded by a capsid made for a single viral encoded protein. The virus is a filamentous particle that measures about 707-808 nm in length. This virus is transmitted by two species of aphids, Myzus persicae and Aphis gossypii, and by mechanical inoculation.

Commercial antiserum is not available for this virus. However, diagnosis in this plant can be made by symptoms and by the presence of plate-like inclusions.

Potyviruses make proteinaceous inclusions in infected plant cells. These inclusions can be seen in the light microscope in leaf strips of infected plant tissue stained with Orange-Green (protein stain) but not Azure A (nucleic acid stain) There are four different kinds of Potyvirus inclusions. ComMV belongs to group II.

== Host Range and Geographic Distribution ==
Commelina mosaic virus was first reported in 1977 and was the first Potyvirus found infecting a member of the plant family, Commelinaceae (2). Since then, two, possibly three, other potyviruses have been reported to infect members of this family, Tradescantia mosaic virus (=Tradescantia/Zebrina virus), Aneilema virus (3) and Tradescantia mild mosaic virus

ComMV was originally found in the host plant Commelina diffusa (2). Later it was also found in Tradescantia spathacea (Rhoeo spathacea) kept under greenhouse conditions (3). Plants of C. diffusa infected with this virus were first found in Florida (2) and in a later study the virus was found in a plant from the Dominican Republic (3). Host range studies indicate that this virus, though common in Florida, has a limited host range and does not pose a risk to agricultural crops. However, it was often found in a double infection with Cucumber mosaic virus (CMV) which is an important pest for Florida agriculture. Plants infected with both viruses were found to be “significantly more effective sources of CMV 5-8 weeks after inoculation that singly infected plants.”(2)
