= Curvularia pallescens =

Scientific classification
- Domain: Eukaryota
- Kingdom: Fungi
- Division: Ascomycota
- Class: Dothideomycetes
- Order: Pleosporales
- Family: Pleosporaceae
- Genus: Curvularia
- Species: C. pallescens

Binomial name
- Curvularia pallescens Boedijn (1933)

Synonyms
- Cochliobolus pallescens (Tsuda & Ueyama) Sivan. (1987); Pseudocochliobolus pallescens Tsuda & Ueyama (1983)

Species of fungus

Curvularia pallescens is a soil fungus, that commonly grows on crops found in tropical regions. The conidia of the fungus are distinguishable from those of related species due to their lack of curvature. C. pallescens has been reported to cause infection in plants, and in immunocompetent individuals. This species is the anamorph of Cochliobolus pallescens.

== Morphology ==
The colonies of C. pallescens differ in morphology depending on the growth medium used. On Czapek Yeast Extract Agar (CYA), colonies of C. pallescens are 50-65mm in diameter. On Malt Extract Agar (MEA), the colonies are fuzzy in texture, and pale grey to grey in colour. On the reverse side, they appear brown to dark brown. The colonies rapidly cover the entire Petri dish. On G25N, the colonies of C. pallescens are 3–6 mm in diameter, and appear grey and brown in colour. On Dichloran Chloramphenicol Malt Agar (DCMA), the colonies are 50–65 mm in diameter, and pale brownish-grey in colour. Lastly, colonies of C. pallescens grown on Phenylethyl Alcohol Agar (PEA) appear woolly at the centre. The conidiophores of C. pallescens are rarely branched, and are brown in colour. They can appear slightly bent at the apices, but otherwise they are predominately straight. The dimensions of the conidiophore vary, especially concerning its length. They can be up to 6μm wide. The conidia of C. pallescens are rugby or gridiron football- to bean-shaped, and are less curved than those of related species. They appear smooth in texture, and pale-brown to brown in colour. The three septa within each conidium give rise to four cells. The third cell from the base appears swollen in comparison to the surrounding cells. The dimensions of the conidia are 18-25 x 9-12 μm.

Cochliobolus pallescens is the teleomorphic form of Curvularia pallescens. It produces spherical ascomata that are black in colour. On the surface of the ascomata, there are protruding colourless necks from which the ascospores emerge. Ascospores are produced within cylindrical asci. The ascospores are colourless, and are either straight or slightly curved. Each ascospore contains 6-13 septa.

== Ecology and growth ==
Curvularia pallescens is commonly found in tropical regions, such as India. They usually grow on unharvested crops (i.e., crops that have not been dried or stored), such as grass, rice, wheat, maize, and sorghum. Optimal growth occurs at 25-30 °C, and at an a_{w} of 0.976. The minimum a_{w} for growth is 0.89. Germination occurs at 0.855 a_{w} but does not result in the establishment of colonies. Sulphur and phosphorus are macronutrients involved in the production of DNA, RNA and proteins in fungal species. It has been reported that C. pallescens is able to grow and sporulate in the absence of both. Magnesium sulphide and tripotassium phosphate support the growth and sporulation of C. pallescens whereas, ammonium sulphate and ammonium phosphate do not.

== Physiology ==
Curvularia pallescens acts as a biological reducing agent of AgNO_{3}, resulting in the production of silver nanoparticles (Ag NPs). This is considered a green method of Ag NP synthesis, unlike other methods that use chemical agents. Silver nanoparticles have widespread applications in industries such as healthcare, environmental health and drug-gene delivery. Curvularia pallescens has been reported to produce several secondary metabolites—particularly, isolates from spirostaphylotrichines and curvupallides. These two groups of secondary metabolites are structurally similar. Isolates of spirostaphylotrichines (i.e., C and D) were found to be phytotoxins whereas, the curvupallide isolates showed no phytotoxic activity. Despite the limited genome sequencing of this fungus, C. pallescens has been found to produce several enzymes with differing immunological and physiological functions in humans. These enzymes include BRN-1, vacuolar protease, fructose-bisphosphate aldolase, mannitol-1-phosphate 5-dehydrogenase, formate dehydrogenase, pyruvate decarboxylase, transketolase, peroxidase, catalase, phosphogluconate dehydrogenase and 14-3-3 protein. These proteins give C. pallescens its allergenic potential in humans. They have also been reported as allergens of other fungal species, and of species outside the kingdom Fungi.

== Infection and disease ==
Curvularia pallescens has been reported to cause subcutaneous, pulmonary, and cerebral lesions, in immunocompetent individuals. It is thought that lesions arise as the result of inhalation of soils containing C. pallescens. The human pathogenic potential of C. pallescens stems from its viability and functionality at the normal human body temperature (37 °C), and its ability to disseminate. In addition to human infection, there have been multiple reported cases of leaf spots caused by C. pallescens, in crops. In particular, infections have occurred in bamboos (such as Bambusa vulgaris, Dendrocalamus longispathus and Thyrsostachys oliveri), sugarcanes, and grasses (such as Imperata arundinacea and Eleusine coracana). The severity of disease and the appearance of the spots differ between species. In B. vulgaris, the leaf spots appear circular or irregular in shape with a greyish-black centre and yellow perimeter. In sugarcane, the leaf spots appear elliptical in shape and light brown in colour. In I. arundinacea and E. coracana, the leaf spots appear irregular in shape and brown to black in colour. Curvularia pallescens invades the host organism via the stomata or proceeding damage. Infection arises as the result of the propagation of hyphae within the host, causing the host cell to rupture. This results in the spotty appearance on the leaf. Over time, the spots combine to form necrotic zones at the leaf tips causing dehydration in those areas. The leaf spots can be controlled by fungicide sprays, such as Mancozeb (0.1%). In addition to leaf spots, infection can result in: the hindrance of germination, inhibited growth of seedlings and mature crops of lesser quality (e.g., fewer grains produced, and the grains that are produced are damaged).
