= Exserohilum echinochloae =

Scientific classification
- Domain: Eukaryota
- Kingdom: Fungi
- Division: Ascomycota
- Class: Dothideomycetes
- Order: Pleosporales
- Family: Pleosporaceae
- Genus: Exserohilum
- Species: E. echinochloae

Binomial name
- Exserohilum echinochloae Sivan. (1984)

Species of fungus

Exserohilum echinochloae is a species of fungus in the family Pleosporaceae. Found in Bangladesh, where it grows on the leaves of Echinochloa colona, it was described as new to science in 1984. It is morphologically similar to Exserohilum monoceras and E. frumentacei, but differs from those species in its longer and wider conidia.
