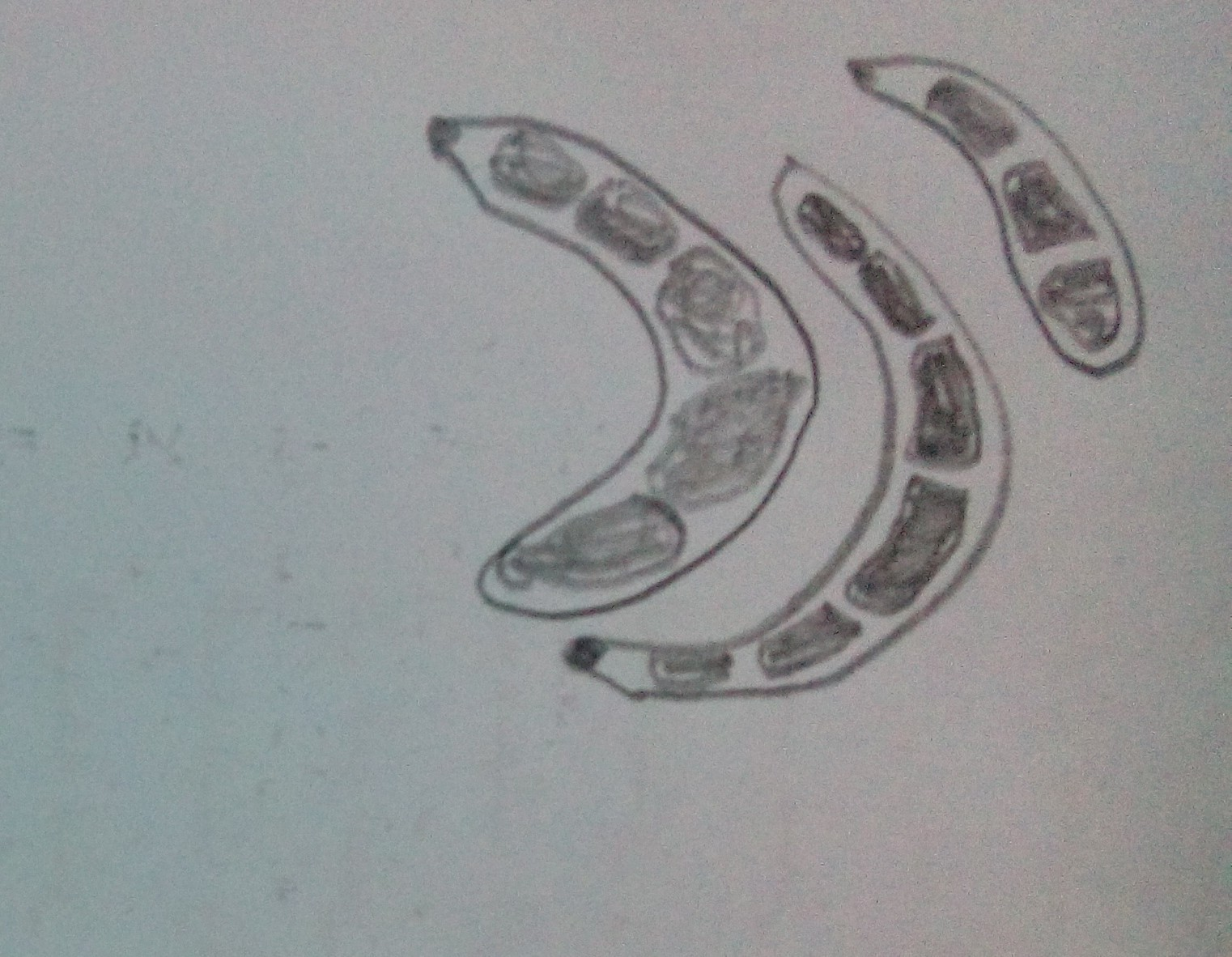

Scientific classification
- Domain: Eukaryota
- Kingdom: Fungi
- Division: Ascomycota
- Class: Dothideomycetes
- Order: Pleosporales
- Family: Pleosporaceae
- Genus: Exserohilum
- Species: E. curvisporum

Binomial name
- Exserohilum curvisporum Sivan., Abdullah & B.A. Abbas

= Exserohilum curvisporum =

Species of fungus

Exserohilum curvisporum is a fungal species found during a survey done on water and sediment of the Shatt al-Arab at Basra, southern Iraq. The research was done by Basil A. Abbas under supervision of S. K. Abdullah in 1993.
