= Exserohilum longirostratum =

Scientific classification
- Domain: Eukaryota
- Kingdom: Fungi
- Division: Ascomycota
- Class: Dothideomycetes
- Order: Pleosporales
- Family: Pleosporaceae
- Genus: Exserohilum
- Species: E. longirostratum

Binomial name
- Exserohilum longirostratum (Subram.) Sivan. (1984)

Synonyms
- Helminthosporium longirostratum Subram. (1957)

Species of fungus

Exserohilum longirostratum is a species of fungus in the family Pleosporaceae. Found in India, it was described as new to science in 1957 as Helminthosporium longirostratum, and transferred to the genus Exserohilum in 1984.
