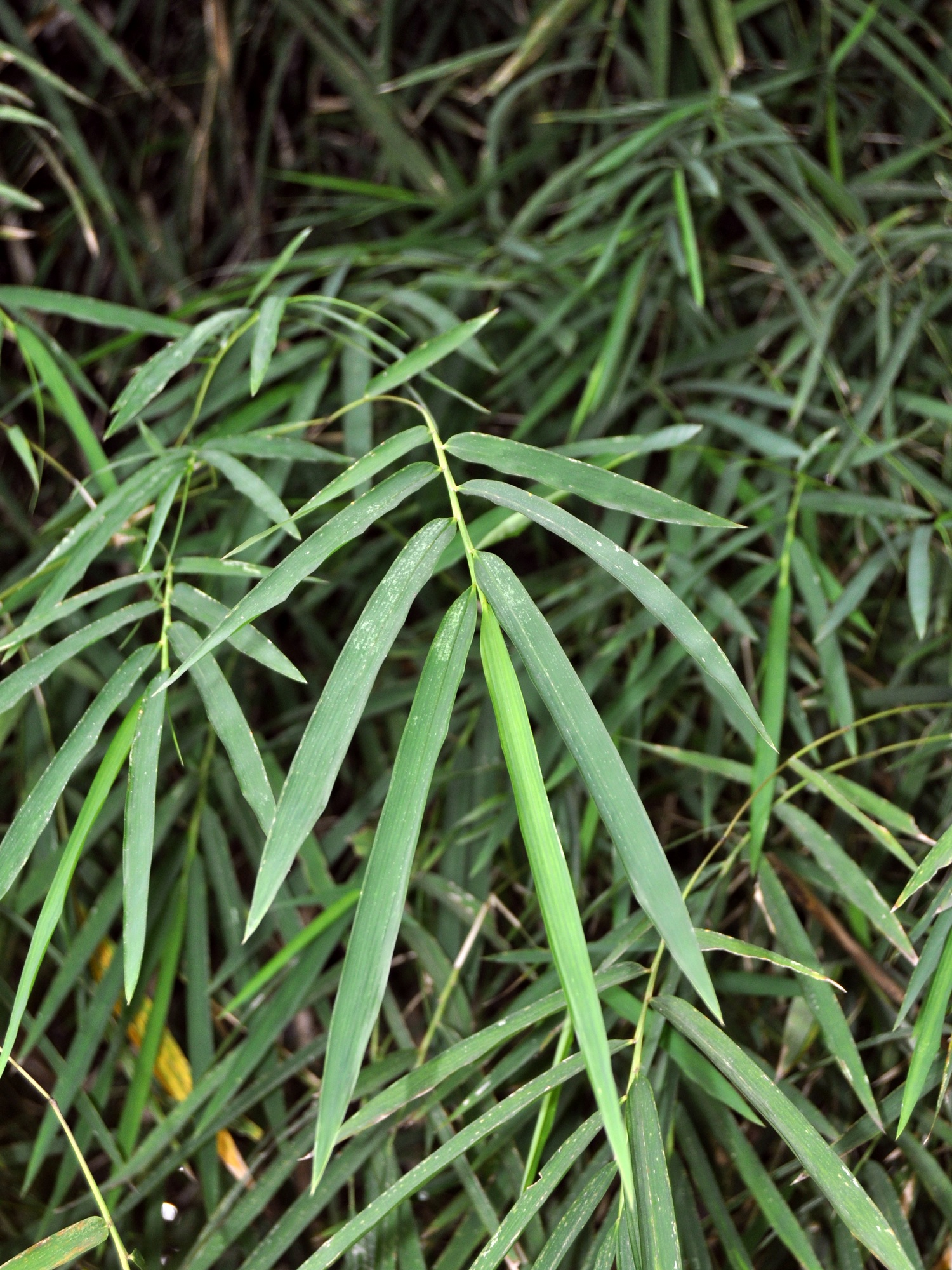

Scientific classification
- Kingdom: Plantae
- Clade: Tracheophytes
- Clade: Angiosperms
- Clade: Monocots
- Clade: Commelinids
- Order: Poales
- Family: Poaceae
- Genus: Thyrsostachys
- Species: T. siamensis

Binomial name
- Thyrsostachys siamensis Gamble

Synonyms
- Arundarbor regia (Munro) Kuntze; Arundinaria siamensis Kurz [Invalid]; Bambusa regia Thomson ex Munro; Bambusa siamensis Kurz ex Munro [Invalid]; Thyrsostachys regia (Munro) Bennet

= Thyrsostachys siamensis =

Bamboo species

Thyrsostachys siamensis is one of two bamboo species belonging to the genus Thyrsostachys. It grows up to 7 to 13m tall. It is native to Yunnan, Myanmar, Laos, Thailand, Vietnam and naturalised in Sri Lanka, Bangladesh, Malaysia. The plant is also known as long-sheath bamboo, monastery bamboo, Thai bamboo, Thai umbrella bamboo, umbrella bamboo, and umbrella-handle bamboo.

== Uses ==
Like other types of bamboo, Thyrsostachys siamensis is valued as a food and in Thailand is commonly canned.

== Appearance ==
Culm is bright green when young, which becomes yellowish green in mature and turns yellowish brown when drying. Young shoots are purplish green in color. Culm is straight. Branching only at top. Aerial roots absent. Internode length is 15–30 cm, and diameter is 3–8 cm. Culm walls are very thick which is almost solid with a very small lumen. Node prominent.

Culm sheath is yellowish green in young plants turns straw colored when mature. It is cylindrical with a triangular blade. Length of the sheath proper is 12.5–17 cm in length and 10–13 cm wide. Blade length is 3–5 cm. Auricles are small. Upper surface of the sheath covered with hairs. Lower surface of the sheath is not hairy. Sheaths persistent.

== Photoautrophic growth ==
Photoautrophic growth was studied by Nguyen for bamboo shoots cultured with and without sugar and different photoperiods on the agar medium. The shoots grown under photoautrophic conditions weighed more and produced more new leaves. Their survival rate was 20% higher than the shoots grown under photomixotrophic conditions.
