= Exserohilum curvatum =

Scientific classification
- Domain: Eukaryota
- Kingdom: Fungi
- Division: Ascomycota
- Class: Dothideomycetes
- Order: Pleosporales
- Family: Pleosporaceae
- Genus: Exserohilum
- Species: E. curvatum

Binomial name
- Exserohilum curvatum Sivan. & Muthaiyan (1984)

Species of fungus

Exserohilum curvatum is a species of fungus in the family Pleosporaceae. Found in Venezuela, where it grows on the leaves of Sorghum, it was described as new to science in 1984. It differs from other Exserohilum species by its distinctly curved conidia.
