= Exserohilum antillanum =

Scientific classification
- Domain: Eukaryota
- Kingdom: Fungi
- Division: Ascomycota
- Class: Dothideomycetes
- Order: Pleosporales
- Family: Pleosporaceae
- Genus: Exserohilum
- Species: E. antillanum

Binomial name
- Exserohilum antillanum R.F.Castañeda, Guarro & Cano (1995)

Species of fungus

Exserohilum antillanum is a species of fungus in the family Pleosporaceae. Found in Cuba growing on plant debris, it was described as new to science in 1995. The specific epithet antillanum refers to the Antillian sea, an old name for the Caribbean Sea. It is most similar in morphology to Exserohilum gedarefense, from which it differs in the size, pigmentation, and ornamentation of its conidia.
