= Exserohilum oryzinum =

Scientific classification
- Domain: Eukaryota
- Kingdom: Fungi
- Division: Ascomycota
- Class: Dothideomycetes
- Order: Pleosporales
- Family: Pleosporaceae
- Genus: Exserohilum
- Species: E. oryzinum

Binomial name
- Exserohilum oryzinum Sivan. (1984)

Species of fungus

Exserohilum oryzinum is a species of fungus in the family Pleosporaceae. Found in Egypt, where it grows on Oryza plants, it was described as new to science in 1984. It is distinguished from other Exserohilum by its distinctly curved to sigmoid (S-shaped) conidia.
