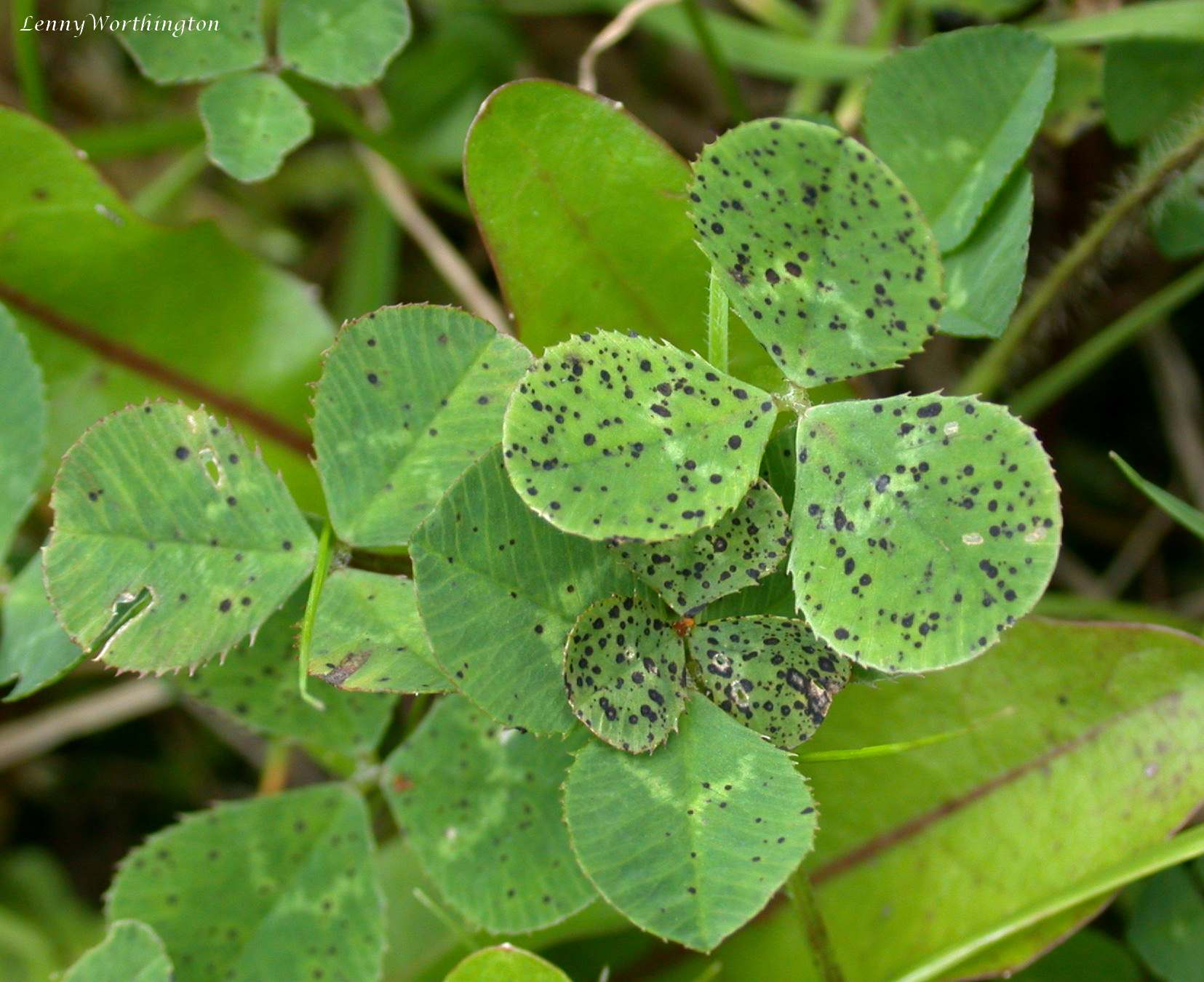

Scientific classification
- Domain: Eukaryota
- Kingdom: Fungi
- Division: Ascomycota
- Class: Dothideomycetes
- Order: Capnodiales
- Family: Mycosphaerellaceae
- Genus: Cymadothea
- Species: C. trifolii

Binomial name
- Cymadothea trifolii (Pers.) F.A. Wolf, (1935)

Synonyms
- Dothidea trifolii (Pers.) Fr., (1849); Dothidella trifolii Bayl. Ell. & O.P. Stansf., (1924); Mycosphaerella killianii Petr. [as 'killiani'], (1941); Phyllachora trifolii (Pers.) Fuckel, (1870); Placosphaeria trifolii (Pers.) Traverso, (1903); Plowrightia trifolii Kill., (1923); Polystigma trifolii (Pers.) Link, (1833); Polythrincium trifolii Kunze, (1817); Sphaerella killianii (Petr.) Sandu, (1971); Sphaeria trifolii Pers., (1801)

= Cymadothea trifolii =

Species of fungus

Cymadothea trifolii is a fungal plant pathogen infecting the red clover.
