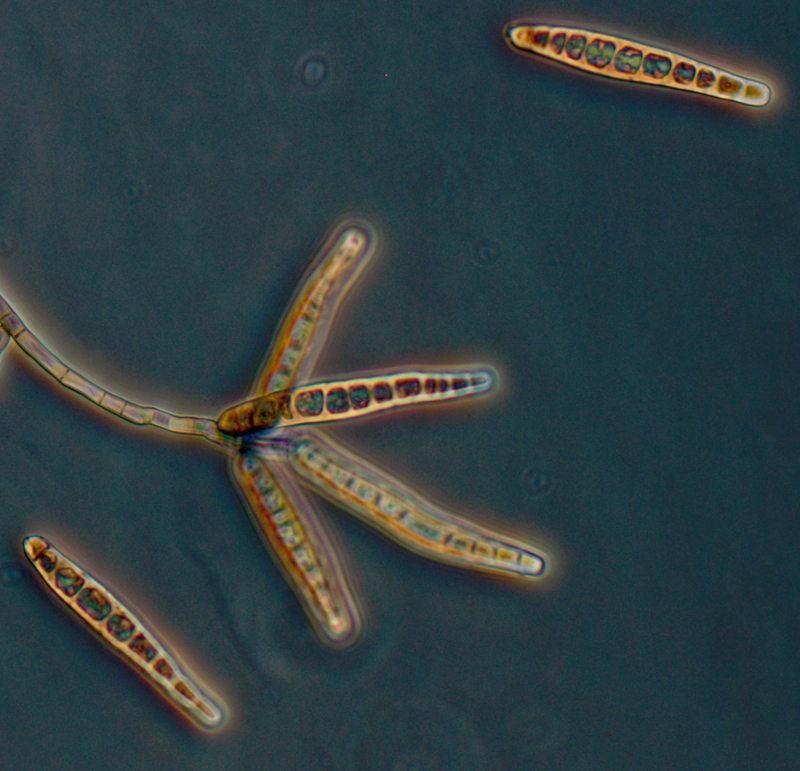

Scientific classification
- Kingdom: Fungi
- Division: Ascomycota
- Class: Dothideomycetes
- Order: Pleosporales
- Family: Pleosporaceae
- Genus: Setosphaeria
- Species: S. rostrata

Binomial name
- Setosphaeria rostrata K.J. Leonard (1976)

= Setosphaeria rostrata =

Pathogenic fungus

Setosphaeria rostrata is a heat tolerant fungus with an asexual reproductive form (anamorph) known as Exserohilum rostratum. This fungus is a common plant pathogen, causing leaf spots as well as crown rot and root rot in grasses. It is also found in soils and on textiles in subtropical and tropical regions. Exserohilum rostratum is one of the 35 Exserohilum species implicated uncommonly as opportunistic pathogens of humans where it is an etiologic agent of sinusitis, keratitis, skin lesions and an often fatal meningoencephalitis. Infections caused by this species are most often seen in regions with hot climates like Israel, India and the southern USA.

== Growth ==
Setosphaeria rostrata produce mature conidia with a distinct protruding hilum. The conidia are either straight, curved or bent and the septum above the hilum is thickened and dark. The walls are typically roughened and brown to olive in colour and there are typically 7–9 septa, however, some have 4–14. Exserohilum species typically exhibit rapid growth producing darkly pigmented colonies. Two other closely related species, E. longirostratum, and E. mcginnisii display a high homology with E. rostratum; however these can be differentiated by conidial morphology. Exserohilum ongirostratum is characterized by larger conidia (up to 228 x 12–19 μm), with 6–16 distosepta centrally curved. In contrast, E. mcginnisii has slightly clavate conidia, which are smooth-walled and brown and measure 44–76 x 11–18 μm with 4–8 distosepta lacking darkened bands.

In vitro studies of E. rostratum growth show sporulation to be completely inhibited by light at 34 °C (93 °F) but not at lower temperatures. Optimum sporulation in continuous light occurs 28–31 °C (82–88 °F) in vitro. At these lower temperatures, sporulation shifts from conidiophore induction to conidial formation. At 34 °C (93 °F) under continuous light, only conidiophores are formed. Sporulation of Exserohilum species can be enhanced by growth on cellulose medium for better identification in culture. In samples of naturally infested soil, overlaying plates with filter paper promotes sporulation and enables detection at low population levels.

== Ecology ==
In 1952, a study of the French Sahara and desert zone of Kizil Koum in Turkestan, identified a wide range of micromycetes in the uppermost layers of the soil. Many of the species present were saprophytic flora of dark pigmentation, including Helminthosporium, Curvularia, Alternaria and Stemphylium . Helminthosporium was the genus name of S. rostrata at the time. These fungi were mainly found in the mobile surface layer of the basin, becoming sparser with increasing depth. During dry periods, the Micromycetes in the mobile surface layers of the basin became mobilized by wind which accounted for the relatively uniform distributions of the surface microflora in the surrounding regions. It was discovered that the microfungal population of these superficial desert soils and sands had developed an adaptive morphology to protect them against unfavourable soil conditions. The dark pigmentation of these species is thought to protect them against light and desiccation, it can be seen in both the vegetative and reproductive states. As well, the spores of most of the Dematiaceae were reported as multicellular, septated transversely in the case of Helminthosporium which increases compartmentalization and protection. Another common characteristic of fungi isolated from desert sands is their rapid development and vast reproductive capacity.

== Pathophysiology ==
The genus Exserohilum comprises dematiaceous fungi commonly associated with foliar plant diseases and rarely with human and animal phaeohyphomycosis. Hosts include sugarcane. Fungi of this genus are characterized by the presence of melanin in their cell walls, which is thought to contribute to their virulence. Many Exserohilum species are plant pathogens that affect a wide range of plant species, especially grasses Poaceae, causing distinct leaf spots and blights. However, S. rostrata has also been shown to survive in human as well as animal hosts, indicating pathogenic versatility. Though E. rostratum is a rare cause of infection in people, the species can cause a spectrum of diseases including allergic fungal sinusitis, skin and subcutaneous infections, invasive disease and occasionally keratomycosis an inflammation of the cornea. Invasive and skin infections caused by Exserohilum occur more frequently in those that are immunodeficient or have impaired immunity, these include infections in the sinuses, lungs, lining of the heart, and bone. Whereas, local trauma is a predisposing factor for skin and corneal infections. Meningitis and peripheral arthritides have also been reported pursuant to exposure to contaminated intrathecal drugs.

The virulence factors implicated in E. rostratum pathogenicity are not well established. E. rostratum is a melanized fungus capable of thriving at mammalian temperatures. In other pathogenic fungi, melanin is a well established virulence factor thought to contribute to virulence by protecting the organism against the immune system of the host. Melanin production has also been associated with drug resistance to polyenes and echinocandins but not to azoles, which is why voriconanole is effective at treating fungal infections.

=== Cutaneous phaeohyphomycosis ===
There are several known cases of primary cutaneous phaehyphomycosis caused by E. rostratum. In most cases the patients were immunocompromised, several of the affected children had acute lymphoblastic leukemia (ALL). In one case, a three-year-old boy with ALL developed a single painless necrotic lesion on his left forearm, which increased rapidly in size to 5 cm in diameter within 24 hours. This lesion occurred at the skin site on his arm where a gauze-covered wood splint secured the intravenous line the day before. In another case, an 8-year-old boy with ALL developed febrile neutropenia with ecthyma gangrenosum, sinus and pulmonary involvement also due to intravenous contamination. The cases of adults with cutaneous phaeohyphomycosis occurred mainly in immunocompromised patients as well. However, there are a few cases of apparently healthy patients who developed phaeohyphomycosis. One such case involved a 55-year-old woman who developed hemorrhagic vesicles after a jelly-fish sting. Another case was of a 22-year-old man who presented with hemorrhagic bullae.

=== Corneal infection ===
In 2012, a case report of keratomycosis in a healthy 46-year-old farmer, found E. rostratum as the cause of corneal infection after an incident of local trauma with vegetable matter. An eye examination revealed a central corneal ulcer about 8 mm with a greyish-white slough, feathery edges and diffuse corneal edema was seen in the right eye.

=== Meningoencephalitis ===
In 2012, E. rostratum was responsible for the nationwide outbreak of fungal meningitis in the U.S caused by contaminated corticosteroid injections from the New England Compounding Center (NECC) in Framingham, Massachusetts. As of October 23, 2013, there were 751 total infected individuals with 76 total deaths. Three hundred and twenty-five individuals presented with spinal or paraspinal infections, 233 of whom had meningitis and the balance presented with paraspinal or peripheral joint infections. In this incident, E. rostratum became highly virulent in the host after inoculation of the fungus into the spine. The preservative-free methylprednisolone acetate (MPA) injection caused limited immunological responsiveness at the site of inoculation, thus allowing the fungus to cause a necrotizing fatal disease of the brain. Post-mortem microscopic analysis also revealed that E. rostratum was angioinvasive, eliciting an inflammatory response with neutrophil predominance.

== Diagnosis and treatment ==
At the time of the 2012 outbreak of meningitis in the U.S., very little was known about E. rostratum including methods for diagnosing and treating infected individuals. Only 30% of 372 patient specimens sent to the Centers for Disease Control and Prevention (CDC) showed PCR evidence of the fungal infection. β-D-glucan assays were suggested as a potential method for early detection. The β-D-glucan assay detects (1,3)-β-D-glucan, a major component of many fungal cell walls released during cell growth. In the case of a 44-year-old man, the galactomamman assay successfully facilitated early detection of E. rostratum. However, in a subsequent study the positive results for early detection of E. rostratum were not successfully replicated.

Effective clinical treatments of infections caused by Exserohilum are still very scarce. Recent cases of sinusitis and cutaneous infections report successful results when treated with amphotericin B, itraconazole and/or voriconazole. Although E. rostratum is sensitive to amphotericin B, a common antifungal agent, the severe and potentially lethal side-effects of this drug have limited its use in certain patients, particularly those of older age. A recent drug repurposing screening of antifungal agents suggests the triazoles posaconazole and lanoconazole as useful alternative agents for treating E. rostratum infection. Posaconazole is highly potent and can be taken orally for the prolonged treatment of non-CNS infections like septic joints. It has also been shown to cross the blood-brain barrier and thus has potential as a treatment for CNS infections as well.

== Biotechnological uses ==
Exserohilum rostratum is being incorporated in technologies for controlling Cyperus iria, a common weed in the rice fields of Southeast Asia. A study determined that E. rostratum has the potential to act as a biocontrol agent incorporated with bentazone to control rice field weeds. This species has also been proposed as an antimalarial agent. E. rostratum was found to be a fungal strain endophytic in the plant species Stemona. Monocerin and 11-hydroxymonocerin were isolated from these cultures, which have applications in antimalarial drugs.
