= Curvularia senegalensis =

Scientific classification
- Domain: Eukaryota
- Kingdom: Fungi
- Division: Ascomycota
- Class: Dothideomycetes
- Order: Pleosporales
- Family: Pleosporaceae
- Genus: Curvularia
- Species: C. senegalensis

Binomial name
- Curvularia senegalensis (Spegazzini) Subramanian, (1956)

Synonyms
- Brachysporium senegalense Spegazzini, (1914)

Pathogenic fungus

Curvularia senegalensis is a fungal plant pathogen.

Curvularia senegalensis is a pathogenic fungus. It is closely related to Curvularia asianensis, Curvularia geniculata, and Curvularia soli. This group is distinguished by conidia which are mostly 4-distoseptate. Curvularia senegalensis is distinguished from Curvularia soli by having shorter conidiophores (up to 150 μm) and wider conidia (10–14 μm).
