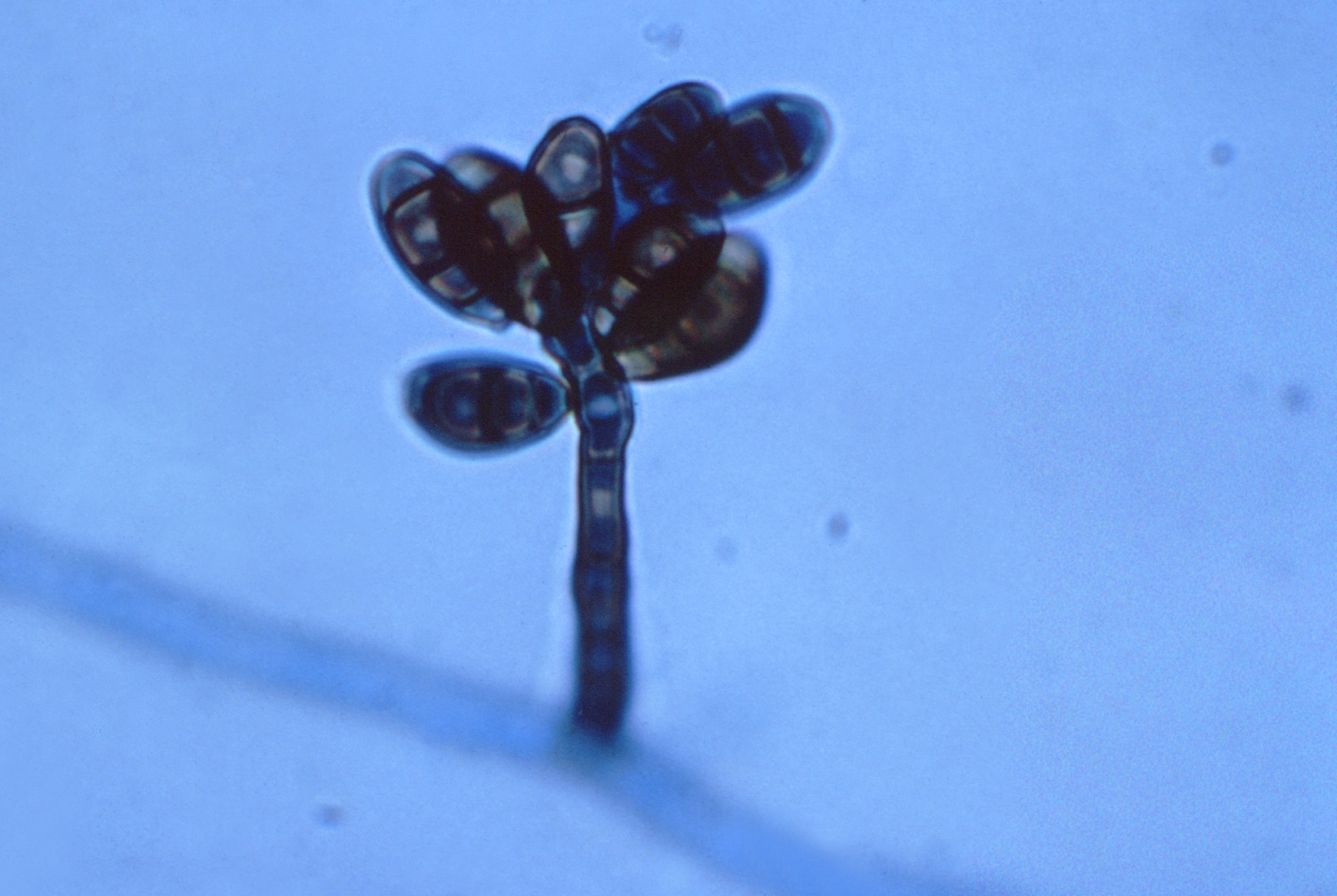
- Curvularia geniculata

Scientific classification
- Domain: Eukaryota
- Kingdom: Fungi
- Division: Ascomycota
- Class: Dothideomycetes
- Order: Pleosporales
- Family: Pleosporaceae
- Genus: Curvularia; Boedijn, 1933

Type species
- Curvularia lunata (Wakker) Boedijn

= Curvularia =

Genus of fungi

Curvularia is a genus of hyphomycete (mold) fungi which can be pathogens but also act as beneficial partners of many plant species. They are common in soil. Most Curvularia species are found in tropical regions, though a few are found in temperate zones.

Curvularia is defined by the type species C. lunata (Wakker) Boedijn.

Curvularia lunata appears as shiny velvety-black, fluffy growth (on the fungus colony surface). These fluffy 'hairs', which really are branching, fine filamentous structures called hyphae, are divided inside by cell walls named septae (-> the hyphae are 'septate'). The walls of these hyphae contain dark pigments, which makes for their black appearance and which is called 'dematiaceous'. The hyphae produce brown spore bearing organs, 'conidiophores', which are distinguished by their 'geniculate' shape, meaning they have bends of abrupt kneelike angles. The immobile, asexual fungal spores born on those conidiophores, the proconidia, have a slightly to distinctly curved shape; they are divided inside by horizontally spreading cell walls (= are 'transversely septate'), and have one expanded cell (the third[clarification needed] cell) at one end (the pore[clarification needed] end of the conidium).

Curvularia can be distinguished from the species Bipolaris and Drechslera by the way (angle) walls (septae) divide the inner structure of their spores.

The name of the teleomorphic state of the type species Curvularia lunata is Cochliobolus lunatus (Fam. Pleosporaceae, Ord. Pleosporales, Cla. Loculoascomycetes, Phy. Ascomycota).

== Heat-tolerance symbiote ==
One species of Curvularia, Curvularia protuberata, is an endosymbiote of the panic grass Dichanthelium lanuginosum that can enable the grass to thrive near hot springs in soil temperatures of up to 149 °F (65 °C). The fungus confers this protective effect only when itself infected by the Curvularia thermal tolerance virus (CThTV). Plants unrelated to panic grass also experience this protective effect when inoculated with the virus-infected fungus.

== Species ==
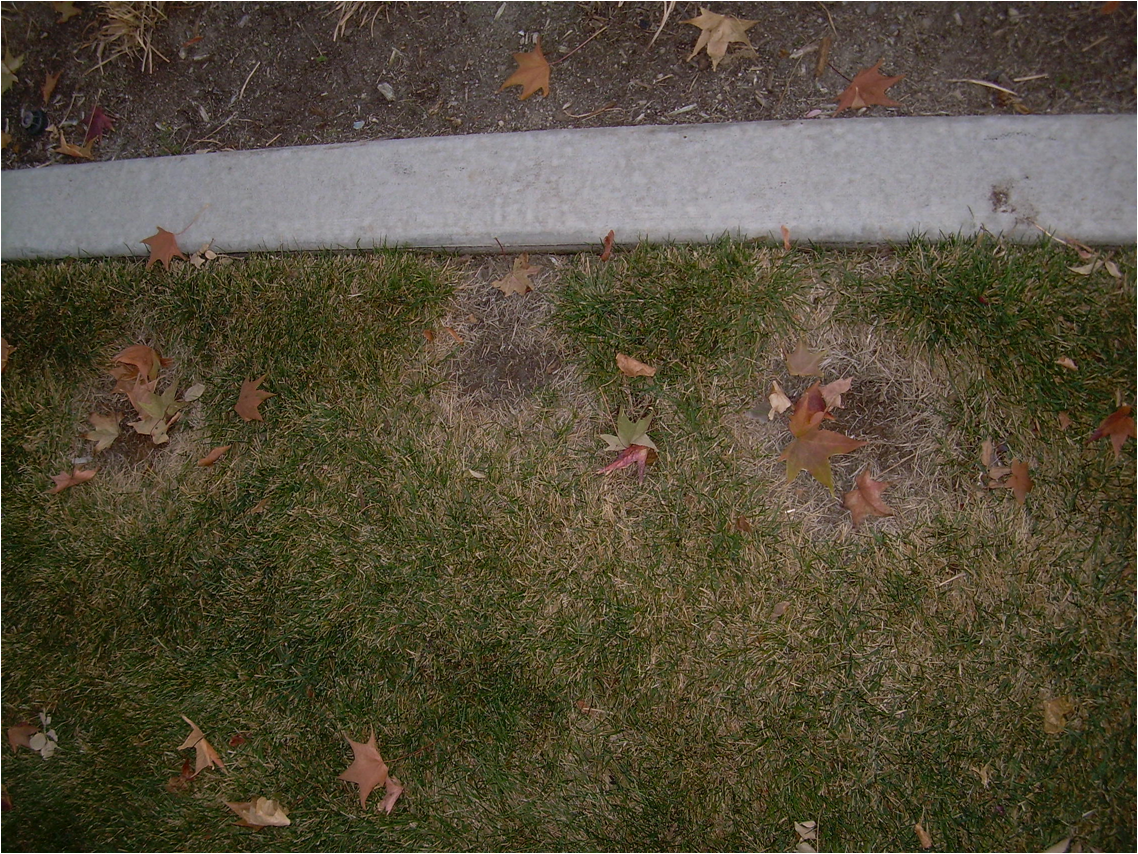
Grass blight caused by Curvularia geniculata

As of 8 August 2023, the GBIF lists up to 164 species, while Species Fungorum lists about 196 species.

Primary species of Curvularia commonly found in soils and on plant tissues (including seeds) are shown here:

- Curvularia affinis
- Curvularia brachyspora
- Curvularia caricae-papayae
- Curvularia cymbopogonis (Cochliobolus cymbopogonis (Teleomorph))
- Curvularia eragrostidis (Cochliobolus eragrostidis (Teleomorph))
- Curvularia fallax
- Curvularia geniculata (Cochliobolus geniculatus (Teleomorph))
- Curvularia harveyi
- Curvularia inaequalis
- Curvularia lunata (Cochliobolus lunatus (Teleomorph))
- Curvularia ovoidea
- Curvularia pallescens
- Curvularia penniseti
- Curvularia prasadii
- Curvularia protuberata
- Curvularia senegalensis
- Curvularia trifolii
- Cochliobolus tuberculatus (Cochliobolus tuberculatus (Teleomorph))
