= Exserohilum oryzicola =

Scientific classification
- Domain: Eukaryota
- Kingdom: Fungi
- Division: Ascomycota
- Class: Dothideomycetes
- Order: Pleosporales
- Family: Pleosporaceae
- Genus: Exserohilum
- Species: E. oryzicola

Binomial name
- Exserohilum oryzicola Sivan. (1984)

Species of fungus

Exserohilum oryzicola is a species of fungus in the family Pleosporaceae. Found in Colombia, where it grows on the leaves of Oryza sativa, it was described as new to science in 1984. It is distinguished from other Exserohilum species by its longer and more tapered conidia.
