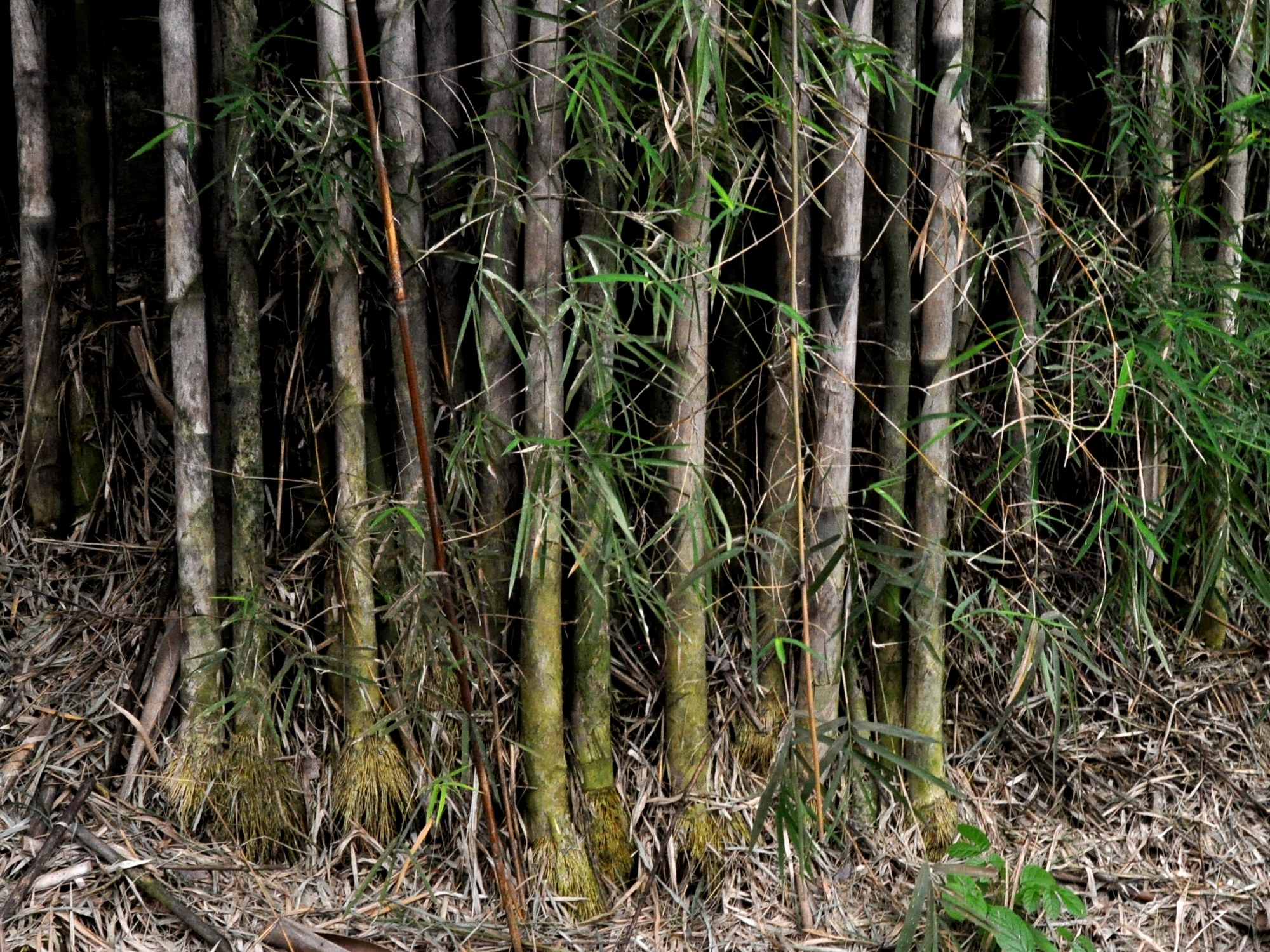
- Thyrsostachys siamensis

Scientific classification
- Kingdom: Plantae
- Clade: Tracheophytes
- Clade: Angiosperms
- Clade: Monocots
- Clade: Commelinids
- Order: Poales
- Family: Poaceae
- Subfamily: Bambusoideae
- Tribe: Bambuseae
- Subtribe: Bambusinae
- Genus: Thyrsostachys; Gamble

= Thyrsostachys =

Genus of grasses

Thyrsostachys is a genus of Chinese and Indochinese bamboo in the grass family.

Species

1. Thyrsostachys oliveri Gamble - edible-seeded bamboo - Yunnan, Myanmar, Laos, Thailand; naturalised in Assam + Bangladesh
2. Thyrsostachys siamensis Gamble - monastery bamboo, Thai bamboo, umbrella bamboo, Thai umbrella bamboo, umbrella-handle bamboo - Yunnan, Myanmar, Laos, Thailand, Vietnam; naturalised in Sri Lanka, Bangladesh, Peninsular Malaysia
