= Pyrenocine =

Group of chemical compounds

Pyrenocines are antibiotic mycotoxins.

== Chemical structures ==
Pyrenocine A

Pyrenocine B

Pyrenocine C

Pyrenocine D

Pyrenocine E

Pyrenocine F

Pyrenocine G

Pyrenocine H
