= Tradescantia mosaic virus =

Tradescantia mosaic virus (TZV)

Virus classification
- Group: Group IV ((+)ssRNA)
- Family: Potyviridae
- Genus: Potyvirus
- Species: Tradescantia mosaic virus

Synonyms
- Tradescantia/Zebrina virus

Species of virus

Tradescantia mosaic virus (TZV) is a plant pathogenic virus in the genus Potyvirus and the virus family Potyviridae. Like other members of the Potyvirus genus, TZV is a monopartite strand of positive-sense, single-stranded RNA surrounded by a capsid made for a single viral encoded protein. The virus is a filamentous particle that measures about 754 nanometers in length. This virus is transmitted by two species of aphids, Myzus persicae and Rhapalosiphum padi and by mechanical inoculation.

== Host range and geographic distribution ==
This virus was originally reported in seven commercial greenhouses in Minnesota. In a study published in 1988, the virus was found in weeds and ornamentals in Florida and in botanical collections from Mexico and Czechoslovakia. Its host range was limited to members of the Commelinaceae. These include Commelina diffusa, Gibasis geniculata, Tradescantia albiflora,T. blossfeldiana, T. fluminensis, Tradescantia spathacea (Rhoeo spathacea), and T. zebrina (Zebrina pendula).
