= Exserohilum heteropogonicola =

Scientific classification
- Kingdom: Fungi
- Division: Ascomycota
- Class: Dothideomycetes
- Order: Pleosporales
- Family: Pleosporaceae
- Genus: Curvularia
- Species: C. heteropogonicola

Binomial name
- Curvularia heteropogonicola (Sivan.) Alcorn

Synonyms
- Exserohilum heteropogonicola Sivan. (1984)

Species of fungus

Curvularia heteropogonicola, formerly known as Exserohilum heteropogonicola, is a species of fungus in the family Pleosporaceae. Found in Uttarakhand, India, where it grows on the leaves of Heteropogon contortus, it was described as new to science in 1984. It has conidia that are cylindrical to fusoid (spindle-shaped), and often curved. It was later moved to the genus Curvularia by J. L. Alcorn.
