= Curvularia spicifera =

Scientific classification
- Kingdom: Fungi
- Division: Ascomycota
- Class: Dothideomycetes
- Order: Pleosporales
- Family: Pleosporaceae
- Genus: Curvularia
- Species: C. spicifera

Binomial name
- Curvularia spicifera (Bainier) Boedijn (1933)

Synonyms
- Brachycladium spiciferum Bainier 1908; Drechslera spicifera (Bainier) Arx (1970); Helminthosporium spiciferum (Bainier) Nicot (1953); Bipolaris spicifera (Bainier) Subram. (1971); Brachysporium spiciferum (Bainier) Corbetta (1963); Dendryphion spiciferum (Bainier) Sacc. & Traverso (1910); Helminthosporium tetramerum McKinney 1925; Dechslera tetramera (McKinney) Subram. & B.L. Jain 1966; Bipolaris tetramera (McKinney) Shoemaker 1925; Helminthosporium tetramera McKinney 1925; Curvularia tetramera (McKinney) Boedijn ex J.C. Gilman 1945

Species of fungus

Curvularia spicifera is a dematiaceous mold in the family Pleosporaceae. It can live in a variety of environments often causing leaf blight and fruit rot on trees. The mold is characterized by suede-like to downy, brown to blackish-brown, rapidly growing colonies. It is a rare opportunistic pathogen in humans causing allergic reactions or infections. The mold spores can be removed from indoor air with a high efficiency particulate air filtration system of 0.3 µm or less.
