= Exserohilum inaequale =

Scientific classification
- Domain: Eukaryota
- Kingdom: Fungi
- Division: Ascomycota
- Class: Dothideomycetes
- Order: Pleosporales
- Family: Pleosporaceae
- Genus: Exserohilum
- Species: E. inaequale

Binomial name
- Exserohilum inaequale Sivan. (1984)

Species of fungus

Exserohilum inaequale is a species of fungus in the family Pleosporaceae. Found in Nigeria, it was described as new to science in 1984. It differs from other Exserohilum species in the size, shape, and septation of its conidia. Additionally, the septa are comparatively dark and thick.
