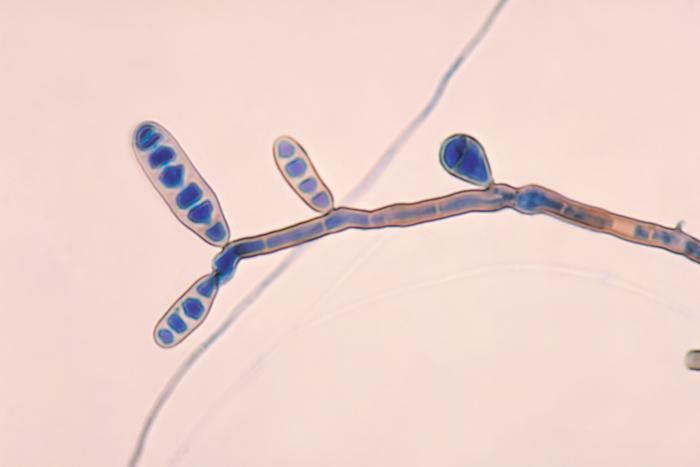
- Setosphaeria rostrata

Scientific classification
- Domain: Eukaryota
- Kingdom: Fungi
- Division: Ascomycota
- Class: Dothideomycetes
- Order: Pleosporales
- Family: Pleosporaceae
- Genus: Setosphaeria; K.J.Leonard & Suggs (1974)

Type species
- Setosphaeria turcica (Luttr.) K.J.Leonard & Suggs (1974)

Species
- S. glycinea S. holmii S. khartoumensis S. minor S. monoceras S. pedicellata S. prolata S. rostrata S. turcica

= Setosphaeria =

Genus of fungi

Setosphaeria is a genus of fungi in the family Pleosporaceae.
