= Curvularia penniseti =

Scientific classification
- Domain: Eukaryota
- Kingdom: Fungi
- Division: Ascomycota
- Class: Dothideomycetes
- Order: Pleosporales
- Family: Pleosporaceae
- Genus: Curvularia
- Species: C. penniseti

Binomial name
- Curvularia penniseti (Mitra) Boedijn, (1933)

Synonyms
- Acrothecium penniseti Mitra, (1921)

Species of fungus

Curvularia penniseti is a fungal plant pathogen.
