= Curvularia caricae-papayae =

Scientific classification
- Kingdom: Fungi
- Division: Ascomycota
- Class: Dothideomycetes
- Order: Pleosporales
- Family: Pleosporaceae
- Genus: Curvularia
- Species: C. caricae-papayae

Binomial name
- Curvularia caricae-papayae H.P. Srivast. & Bilgrami [as 'carica-papayae'], (1963)

Species of fungus

Curvularia caricae-papayae is a plant pathogen. It was found on the leaves of Carica papaya in Uttar Pradesh, India.
