= Cymadothea =

Scientific classification
- Domain: Eukaryota
- Kingdom: Fungi
- Division: Ascomycota
- Class: Dothideomycetes
- Order: Capnodiales
- Family: Mycosphaerellaceae
- Genus: Cymadothea; F.A. Wolf

Genus of fungi

Cymadothea is a genus of fungi in the family Mycosphaerellaceae.
