= Cochliobolus tuberculatus =

Scientific classification
- Kingdom: Fungi
- Division: Ascomycota
- Class: Dothideomycetes
- Order: Pleosporales
- Family: Pleosporaceae
- Genus: Cochliobolus
- Species: C. tuberculatus

Binomial name
- Cochliobolus tuberculatus Sivan., (1985)

Synonyms
- Curvularia tuberculata B.L. Jain, (1962)

Pathogenic fungus

Cochliobolus tuberculatus is a plant pathogen.

== Genomics ==
Condon et al., 2013 elucidates the pathogen's relationship with other Cochliobolus.
