= Cochliobolus cymbopogonis =

Scientific classification
- Domain: Eukaryota
- Kingdom: Fungi
- Division: Ascomycota
- Class: Dothideomycetes
- Order: Pleosporales
- Family: Pleosporaceae
- Genus: Cochliobolus
- Species: C. cymbopogonis

Binomial name
- Cochliobolus cymbopogonis J.A. Hall & Sivan., (1972)

Synonyms
- Curvularia cymbopogonis (C.W. Dodge) J.W. Groves & Skolko [as 'cymbopogi'], (1945); Helminthosporium cymbopogonis C.W. Dodge [as 'cymbopogi'], (1942)

Species of fungus

Cochliobolus cymbopogonis is a fungal plant pathogen. Those fungi that do not need a partner to mate are termed homothallic (self-fertile). C. cymbopogonis is homothallic.
