= Curvularia trifolii =

Scientific classification
- Domain: Eukaryota
- Kingdom: Fungi
- Division: Ascomycota
- Class: Dothideomycetes
- Order: Pleosporales
- Family: Pleosporaceae
- Genus: Curvularia
- Species: C. trifolii

Binomial name
- Curvularia trifolii (Kauffman) Boedijn, (1933)

Synonyms
- Brachysporium trifolii Kauffman, (1920)

Species of fungus

Curvularia trifolii is a plant pathogen.

== Host and symptoms ==
Curvularia trifolii is a fungal pathogen which causes leaf blight in clover. When the host plant is infected, lesions on the leaf start to appear as yellow discolored patches. These patches will eventually turn brown and form characteristic V-shaped lesions in between the leaf veins. When the petiole is infected, the leaf withers and dies. Damage is more common in younger leaves of the clover plant. C. trifolii occurs severely when the temperature increases considerably after the rainy season.

== Environment ==
Curvularia trifolii is commonly found in tropical regions around the world. Depending on the host plant, the pathogen can survive at temperatures of 40 degree Celsius with the optimal temperature range being from 25 - 30 degrees Celsius. This pathogen can be easily cultured in potato dextrose agar at room temperature (20 -25 degree Celsius). The color of the colony is white to pinkish-gray initially and turns to olive brown or black as the colony matures.

== Management ==
Severe attack by Curvularia trifolii greatly reduces winter-spring pasture production of forageable clover and frequently coincides with feed shortage by late fall, leading to significant decreases in biomass production for overwintering clover species. Approaches to disease control include a range of management strategies. Utilization of fungicides is the most common for control of the disease. Resistances in clover have been found and give the best long term control of the pathogen. However, some growers choose to use fungicides instead of resistant hosts because this also prevents other fungal diseases from growing.
