= Karel Bernard Boedijn =

Dutch botanist and mycologist (1893–1964)

Karel Bernard Boedijn (29 June 1893 – 29 August 1964) was a Dutch botanist and mycologist who made significant contributions to the study of tropical fungi in the Dutch East Indies (present-day Indonesia). After earning his doctorate from the University of Amsterdam in 1925, he spent three decades in Southeast Asia as a professor and researcher, surviving Japanese internment during World War II when he identified medicinal plants for fellow prisoners. His prolific output of more than 80 scientific papers—covering diverse fungal groups from slime moulds to basidiomycetes and featuring his meticulous camera lucida illustrations—collectively formed what colleague Marinus Anton Donk described as "an unequalled fund of information on the mycology of Indonesia".

== Early life and education ==
Boedijn spent his childhood in Amsterdam, where weekend excursions into the surrounding countryside fostered a lifelong passion for studying plants and fungi. After completing his primary and secondary schooling, he worked in a corn trade office, devoting his free time to botanical observation. The upheaval of the First World War cost him this position and led him to contemplate careers in both painting and biology. Ultimately, an appointment as private assistant to professor Hugo de Vries proved decisive, enabling him to enrol at the University of Amsterdam. He completed his studies cum laude in 1925 with a doctoral thesis on chromosome mutations in Oenothera lamarckiana.

== Career ==
In 1926, shortly after marrying biology student A. R. Heerema, Boedijn emigrated to the Netherlands East Indies. He was first appointed to the AVROS Agricultural Experiment Station and later joined the Botanical Garden in Buitenzorg (now Bogor, Indonesia). By 1933 he had become professor of botany at the medical university in Batavia (present-day Jakarta) and subsequently at its agricultural faculty. During the Second World War, Boedijn was interned by Japanese occupying forces from 1943 to 1946; in captivity he applied his botanical expertise to collect and identify plants with medicinal properties for use by fellow prisoners. After a brief return to the Netherlands, he resumed his professorship at the University of Bogor in 1947, remaining there until political unrest prompted his permanent repatriation to Europe in 1958. He spent his final years living in The Hague, where he maintained a working library and an extensive mycological herbarium in his home.

== Research contributions and legacy ==
Over his career, Boedijn authored more than 80 papers spanning the full range of fungal groups—from slime moulds (which he termed Mycetozoa) and yeasts to ascomycetes, basidiomycetes and deuteromycetes. He circumscribed several genera, including Curvularia, and was admired for his precise camera lucida illustrations. His work greatly enriched knowledge of tropical mycoflora, particularly in Indonesia. After his sudden death on 29 August 1964, his personal herbarium was incorporated into the Botanical Museum in Utrecht. Colleagues remembered him as a dedicated field investigator, meticulous microscopist and generous mentor whose character was described as steadfast, upright and kind.

== Selected publications ==
Boedijn's papers—ranging from succinct notes to more extensive monographs—demonstrate his practice of mastering one fungal group before moving on to another, which resulted in an exceptionally broad and high‑quality coverage of Indonesian mycoflora. Early collaborations with A. Steinmann on Helicobasidium and Septobasidium (1931) were followed by foundational treatments of Sarcosoma (1932), the Phallineae (1932) and the genera Phillipsia and Cookeina (1933). His later studies on Amanita (1951), the Myriangiales (1961) and the Sordariaceae (1962) cemented his reputation as one of the few all‑round tropical mycologists. As Marinus Anton Donk noted, these concise papers collectively form "an unequalled fund of information on the mycology of Indonesia".

- Boedijn, K.B.; van Overeem, C. (1918). "Mykologische Mitteilungen. Serie I. Ascomyceten. Erstes Stück. Über das Vorkommen von Carotinkristallen in zwei neuen Pezizaarten" [Mycological communications. Series I. Ascomycetes. First part. On the occurrence of carotene crystals in two new Peziza species]. Hedwigia. 59: 307–312.
- Boedijn, K.B.; Steinmann, A. (1931). "Les espèces des genres Helicobasidium et Septobasidium des Indes Néerlandaises" [The species of the genera Helicobasidium and Septobasidium of the Netherlands Indies]. Bulletin du Jardin Botanique de Buitenzorg. 3rd series. 11 (2): 165–219.
- Boedijn, K.B. (1932). "The genus Sarcosoma in Netherlands India". Annales du Jardin Botanique de Buitenzorg. 3rd series. 12 (2): 273–279.
- Boedijn, K.B. (1932). "The Phallineae of the Netherlands East Indies". Annales du Jardin Botanique de Buitenzorg. 3rd series. 12: 71–103.
- Boedijn, K.B. (1933). "The genera Phillipsia and Cookeina in Netherlands India". Annales du Jardin Botanique de Buitenzorg. 3rd series. 13 (1): 57–76.
- Boedijn, K.B. (1951). "Notes on Indonesian fungi: the genus Amanita". Sydowia. 5: 317–327.
- Boedijn, K.B. (1961). "Myriangiales from Indonesia". Persoonia. 2 (1): 63–75.
- Boedijn, K.B. (1962). "The Sordariaceae of Indonesia". Persoonia. 2 (3): 305–320.
- Boedijn, K.B. (1964). "The genus Thuemenella with remarks on Hypocreaceae and Nectriaceae". Persoonia. 3: 1–7.

== Eponymous taxa ==
Many species as well as narrower and broader taxonomical units have been named for Boedijn.

- Boedijnopeziza S.Ito & S.Imai (1937)
- Asterina boedijniana Hansf. (1954)
- Ceramothyrium boedijnii Bat., Nascim. & Cif. (1962)
- Chaetothyrium boedijnii Hansf. (1957)
- Cordierites boedijnii W.Y.Zhuang (1988)
- Gastroboletus boedijnii Lohwag (1926)
- Inocybe trechispora var. boedijnii Singer (1936)
- Lembosia boedijnii Hansf. (1945)
- Meliola boedijniana Hansf. (1954)
- Meliola boedijnii Cif. (1951)
- Midotis boedijnii Cif. (1957)
- Pseudocercospora boedijniana U.Braun (2001)
- Septobasidium boedijnii Couch ex L.D.Gómez & Henk (2004)

== See also ==
- Category:Taxa named by Karel Bernard Boedijn
