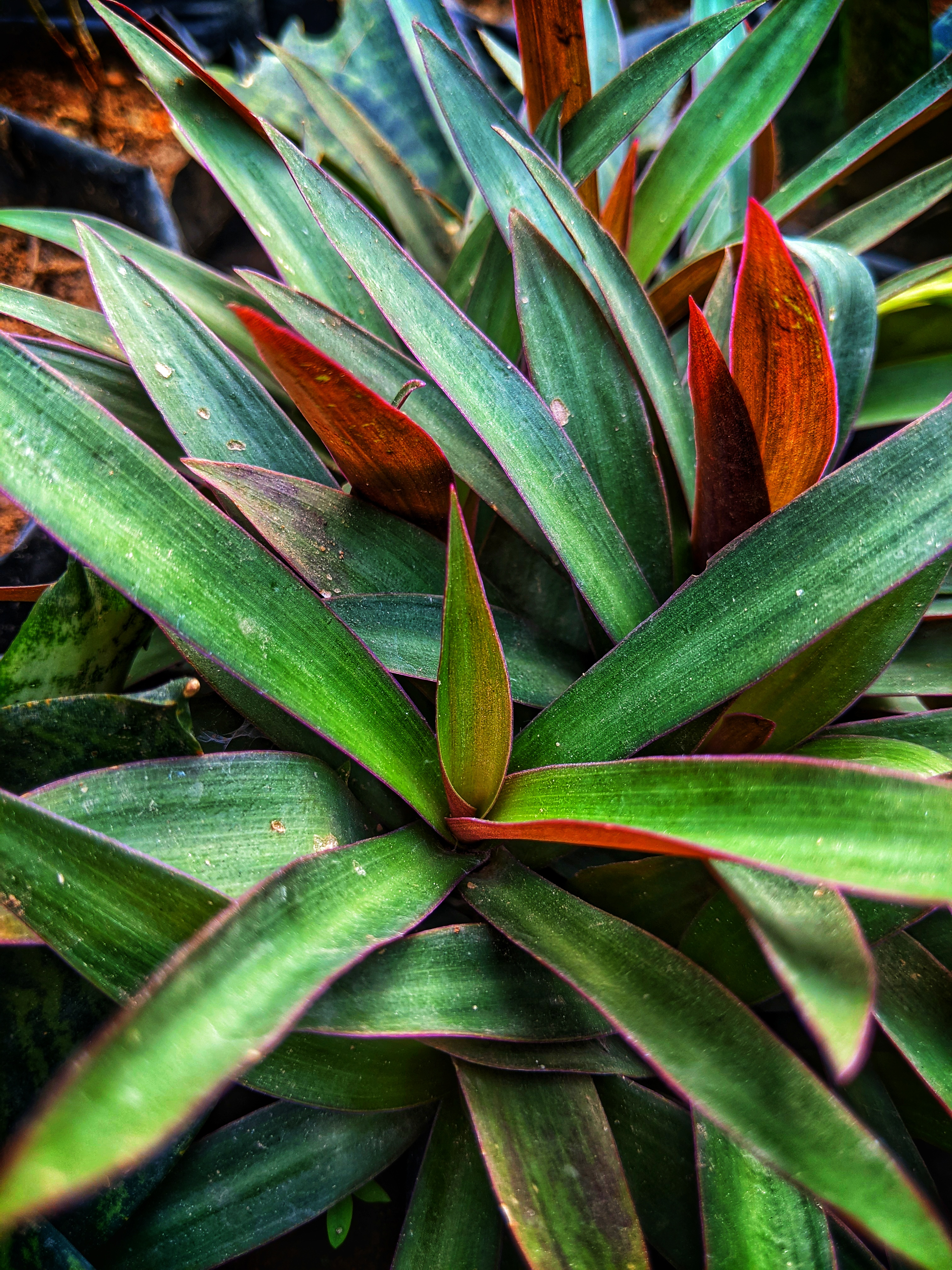

Scientific classification
- Kingdom: Plantae
- Clade: Tracheophytes
- Clade: Angiosperms
- Clade: Monocots
- Clade: Commelinids
- Order: Commelinales
- Family: Commelinaceae
- Genus: Tradescantia
- Species: T. spathacea

Binomial name
- Tradescantia spathacea Sw.

Synonyms
- List: Ephemerum bicolor Moench; Rhoeo discolor (L'Hér.) Hance; Rhoeo spathacea (Sw.) Stearn; Rhoeo spathacea f. concolor (Baker) Stehlé; Rhoeo spathacea f. variegata (Hook.) Stehlé; Tradescantia discolor L'Hér.; Tradescantia discolor var. concolor Baker; Tradescantia discolor var. variegata Hook.; Tradescantia versicolor Salisb.

= Tradescantia spathacea =

Species of herb

Tradescantia spathacea, also called the oyster plant, boatlily or 'Moses-in-the-cradle', is a herb in the Commelinaceae family which was first described in 1788. It is native to Central America.

The plant's common name "Moses in the Cradle" is due to its small, white flowers within a boat-shaped, purple bract that resembles a cradle, which is a visual resemblance to the biblical story of Moses in the bulrushes, where he was placed in a basket.

== Description ==
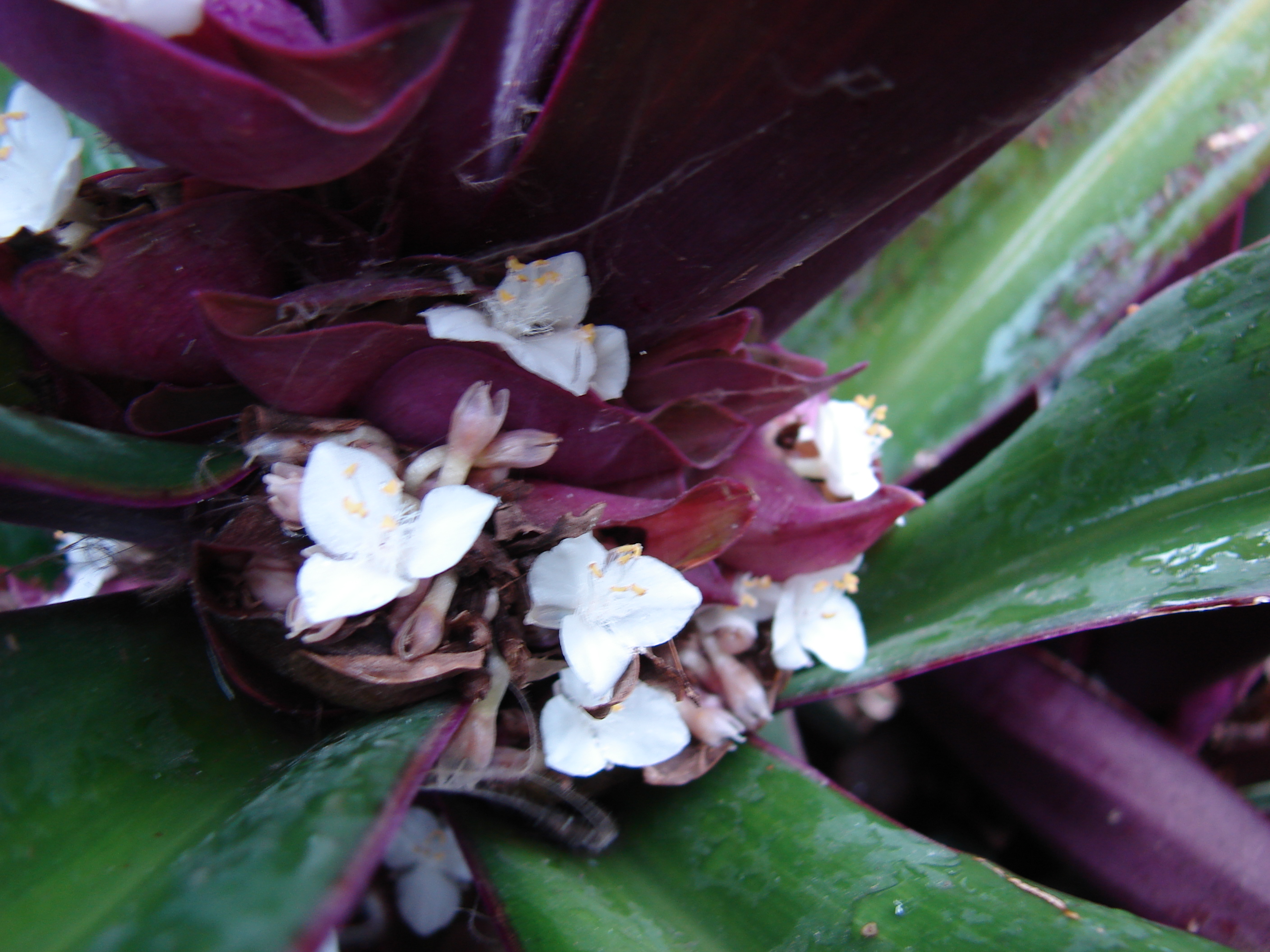
The compound inflorescence inside bracts which lend the name "boat lily" and "Moses-in-the-cradle"

Tradescantia spathacea has fleshy rhizomes and rosettes of waxy lance-shaped leaves. Leaves are dark to metallic green above, with glossy purple underneath. These will reach up to 0.30 m (1 ft) long by 76 mm (3 in) wide. They are foliage plants that reach a height of around 0.30 m (1 ft). The short-stemmed perennial shrub grows in a dense clump and forms a rosette of thick, lanceolate or linear leaves, about 30 cm long and 7 cm wide, facing upward, which are dark green above and purple below. The color of the underside is due to certain pigments, anthocyanins. Some varieties, such as 'vittata', have longitudinal yellow stripes on the upper side of the leaf.

The flowers are very small, white and clustered, arise in axillary cymes enclosed in purple, boat-shaped bracts (giving their common name, Moses-in-the-Cradle). The flowers appear from spring to autumn.

== Distribution ==
It is native to Belize, Guatemala, and southern México (Chiapas, Tabasco, and the Yucatán Peninsula) and is widely cultivated as an ornamental houseplant; it has become naturalized in parts of coastal Southern California, Florida, Hawaii, Louisiana, Texas, and various Pacific and Indian Ocean islands.

== Cultivation ==
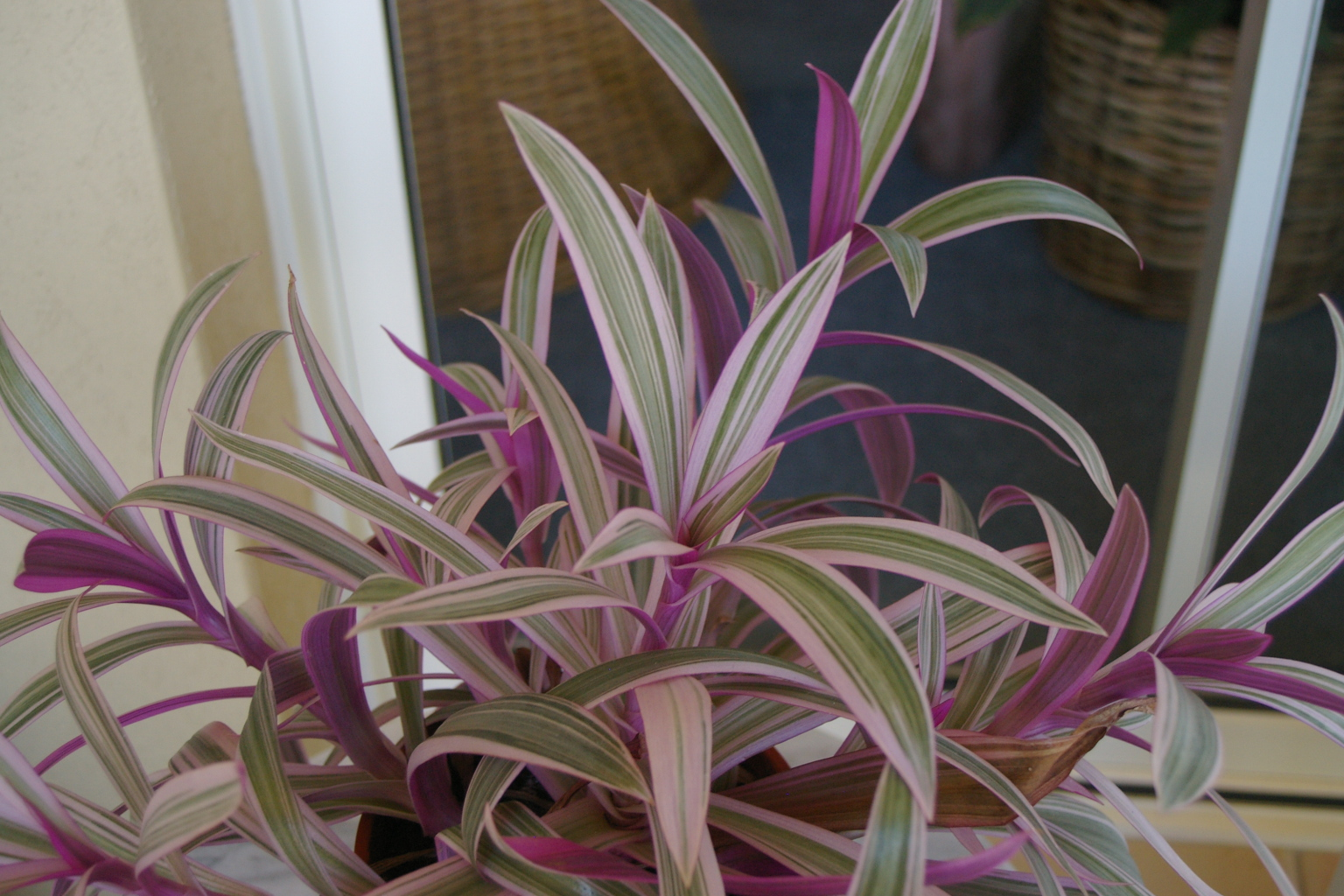
Cultivar with pink and light green leaves

They are hardy in USDA zones 9-12 and are also grown as ornamental houseplants. Its cultivar 'Sitara' has gained the Royal Horticultural Society's Award of Garden Merit. In Mexico, it is used in traditional medicine as a medicinal plant for sores and wounds, as well as an antiseptic and anti-inflammatory.

== Invasiveness ==
Tradescantia spathacea has naturalized in parts of coastal Southern California, Florida, Hawaii, Louisiana, Texas, and various Pacific and Indian Ocean islands and is listed as a Category II invasive exotic species by the Florida Exotic Pest Plant Council. "This means Invasive exotics that have increased in abundance or frequency but have not yet altered Florida plant communities to the extent shown by Category I species. These species may become ranked Category I if ecological damage is demonstrated."
