= Pseudocochliobolus eragrostidis =

Scientific classification
- Kingdom: Fungi
- Division: Ascomycota
- Class: Dothideomycetes
- Order: Pleosporales
- Family: Pleosporaceae
- Genus: Pseudocochliobolus
- Species: P. eragrostidis

Binomial name
- Pseudocochliobolus eragrostidis Tsuda & Ueyama, (1985)

Synonyms
- Brachysporium eragrostidis Henn., (1908); Cochliobolus eragrostidis (Tsuda & Ueyama) Sivan., (1987); Curvularia eragrostidis (Henn.) J.A. Mey., (1959); Curvularia maculans (C.K. Bancr.) Boedijn, (1933); Spondylocladium maculans C.K. Bancr., (1913)

Species of fungus

Pseudocochliobolus eragrostidis is a plant pathogen infecting commelinids (banana, maize, pineapple).
