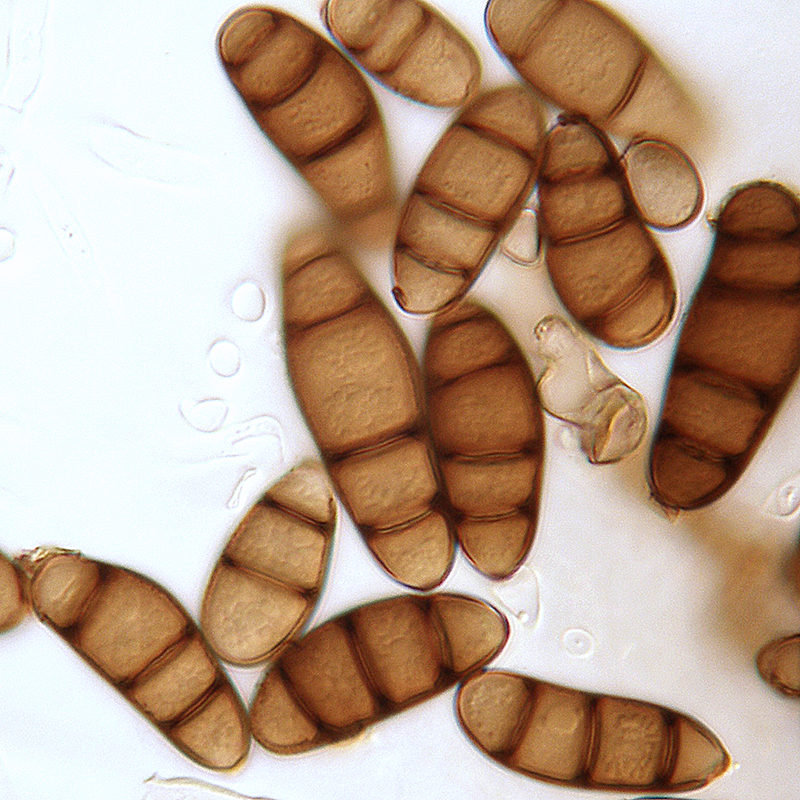

Scientific classification
- Kingdom: Fungi
- Division: Ascomycota
- Class: Dothideomycetes
- Order: Pleosporales
- Family: Pleosporaceae
- Genus: Cochliobolus
- Species: C. lunatus

Binomial name
- Cochliobolus lunatus R.R. Nelson & Haasis, (1964)

Synonyms
- Acrothecium lunatum Wakker, in Wakk. & Went., (1898); Curvularia lunata (Wakker) Boedijn, (1933); Curvularia lunata var. lunata (Wakker) Boedijn, (1933); Pseudocochliobolus lunatus (R.R. Nelson & Haasis) Tsuda, Ueyama & Nishih., (1978)

= Cochliobolus lunatus =

Fungal plant pathogen

Cochliobolus lunatus is a fungal plant pathogen that can cause disease in humans and other animals. The anamorph of this fungus is known as Curvularia lunata, while C. lunatus denotes the teleomorph or sexual stage. They are, however, the same biological entity. C. lunatus is the most commonly reported species in clinical cases of reported Cochliobolus infection.

== Morphology ==
Macroscopic features of C. lunatus include brown to black colour, hairy, velvety or woolly texture, and loosely arranged and rapidly growing colonies on potato dextrose agar medium. Microscopically, the conidiophores are septate. There is great variety in the arrangement of the conidiophores, as they can be isolated or in groups, straight or bent, show simple or geniculate growth pattern, and vary in colour ranging from pale to dark brown. Conidiophore length can reach 650 μm and are often 5–9 μm wide, with swollen bases ranging from 10–15 μm in diameter. Conidia develop at the tips and sides of the spores and have a smooth texture. C. lunatus is differentiated from other Cochliobolus species by its three septa and four cells, with the first and last cell usually of a paler shade of brown than those in the middle. Conidia range from 9–15 μm in diameter and have a curved appearance.

== Phylogeny ==
The order Pleosporales includes many plant pathogens of economic importance. C. lunatus belongs to Clade-II in the family Pleosporaceae, which is the largest family in its order. The Clk1 MAPK gene in C. lunatus is homologous to MAPK genes such as Pmk1, Cmk1, Chk1 and Ptk1 of other fungal pathogens, which are highly conserved in eukaryotic lineages. There are over 80 species in the genus.

== Ecology ==
Cochliobolus lunatus has a widespread distribution, though it is especially prevalent in the tropics and subtropics. Infection is caused by airborne conidia and ascospores, however, sclerotioid C. lunatus can also survive in the soil. The optimal temperature for in vitro growth and infection ranges from 24–30 °C (75–86 °F) while death results from exposure at 59 °C (138 °F) for a 1 minute duration, or 55 °C (131 °F) for a 5 minute duration. Successful plant host infection requires the host surface to be wet for 13 hours. The majority of clinical cases have been reported in India, the United States, Brazil, Japan and Australia.

== Pathogenicity and therapy ==
=== Plant diseases ===
Cochliobolus lunatus is best known as the causative agent of seedling blight and seed germination failure in monocotyledon crops such as sugarcane, rice, millet and maize (corn). C. lunatus also causes leaf spot on a wide variety of angiosperm hosts, where each lesion contains a sporulating mass of fungi at its center. The Clk1 gene plays an important role in fungal growth during the infection process, specifically conidiation, which is vital to the process of foliar infection. Fungicides, in particular those with organo-mercurial compounds, have been associated with effective eradication of this pathogen.

=== Human diseases ===
==== Phaeohyphomycoses ====
Cochliobolus lunatus is one of the main causative agents of phaeohyphomycosis. Initial infection via breaks to the epidermal barrier or the inhalation of spores can lead to disseminated infections, which are often associated with a poor prognosis. C. lunatus is an opportunistic pathogen, infecting immunocompromised patients and those on rigorous steroid drug regimens such as solid organ transplant recipients, advanced AIDS patients and cancer patients. Dematiaceous fungi such as C. lunatus can facilitate foreign body infections of catheters, heart valves and pacemakers, for example.

With regards to treatment, surgical excision using a method similar to Mohs surgery is preferred if the mycosis is accessible, especially for abscesses in the brain. Administration of antifungals is commonly indicated as secondary management therapy, though the specific best regimen depends on the nature and location of the phaeohyphomycosis. When treating immunocompromised patients, it is critical that the underlying disease is controlled, and immune modulators such as granulocyte-macrophage colony-stimulating factor and gamma interferon can be indicated when surgery or antifungals are not feasible alternatives.

==== Allergy ====
Allergic fungal manifestations include asthma, rhinitis, sinusitis and bronchopulmonary mycoses caused by a variety of etiological fungal agents including C. lunatus. These agents provoke humoral immune responses, characterized by type I (immediate) and type III (immune complex mediated) hypersensitivity reactions. Prevalence of these diseases among the atopic population is 20-30 % and 6% in the general population. Allergic rhinitis, more commonly known as hay fever, is less frequently encountered in clinic compared to allergic fungal sinusitis. Differential diagnosis of allergic bronchopulmonary mycosis is difficult, and it is often misdiagnosed as tuberculosis, pneumonia, bronchiectasis, lung abscess or bronchial asthma.

Several serological tests can be performed to assess total IgE and allergen specific IgE and IgG: ELISA, MAST, HIA, and CAP RAST. However, more conventional allergy testing such as skin-prick tests can provide rapid results and are easy to conduct and inexpensive, though they may indicate false-positive or false-negative results. Current research has shown that there is an association between allergic fungal sinusitis and MHC II alleles, suggesting a genetic component to this chronic inflammatory respiratory tract disorder. Treatment for allergic fungal sinusitis includes post-operative corticosteroid and aggressive anti-allergic inflammatory regimen including itraconazole or amphotericin B, while treatment for bronchopulmonary mycosis usually does not include surgery.

==== Eye infection ====
Mycotic keratitis and conjunctivitis are more commonly reported in tropical climates. Environmental factors such as wind, temperature, rainfall and humidity have been found to influence the ecology of filamentous fungi. In the Gulf of Mexico for example, increased numbers of airborne spores of C. lunatus during hot, humid months has been linked to increased clinical reports of keratitis. C. lunatus commonly infects the cornea, and orbit of the eye, and infection can result from trauma, surgery or dissemination from paranasal sinuses. Endophthalmitis can result from deep fungal keratitis caused by C. lunatus, where the Descemet's membrane is penetrated and compromised.

In immunocompetent atopic individuals, 17% of those affected with allergic fungal sinusitis can develop orbital mycotic symptoms, where the fungus acts as an allergen causing allergic mucin. Pre-existing allergic fungal sinusitis, allergic conjunctivitis and use of soft contact lenses are risk factors for development of ophthalmomycosis. Typical therapy includes administration of natamycin and azoles such as itraconazole, fluconazole, posaconazole and voriconazole.
