= List of Myllocerus species =

List of the 331 Myllocerus species

This is a list of 331 species in Myllocerus, a genus of oriental broad-nosed weevils in the family Curculionidae.

== Myllocerus species ==
- Myllocerus abstersus (Pascoe, 1870)^{c g}
- Myllocerus abyssinicus Hustache, 1922^{c g}
- Myllocerus acaciae Hoffmann, 1961^{c g}
- Myllocerus aeruginosus Lea, 1925^{c g}
- Myllocerus aidebus Hustache, 1934^{c g}
- Myllocerus alboscutellatus Hustache, 1934^{c g}
- Myllocerus alternans Voss, 1932^{c g}
- Myllocerus amblyrhinus Lea, 1905^{c g}
- Myllocerus anamalainus Marshall, 1916^{c g}
- Myllocerus andrewesi Marshall, 1916^{c g}
- Myllocerus angolanus Hustache, 1923^{c g}
- Myllocerus angulatipes Marshall, 1916^{c g}
- Myllocerus angustibasis Lea, 1914^{c g}
- Myllocerus anoplus Lea, 1915^{c g}
- Myllocerus aphthosus Pascoe, 1869^{c g}
- Myllocerus aristatus Boheman, 1834^{c g}
- Myllocerus armipectus Lea, 1914^{c g}
- Myllocerus armipes Lea, 1925^{c g}
- Myllocerus ashi Lea, 1917^{c g}
- Myllocerus athianus Marshall, 1944^{c g}
- Myllocerus atjehensis Ritsema, 1876^{c g}
- Myllocerus auriceps Fåhraeus, 1871^{c g}
- Myllocerus aurifex Pascoe, 1869^{c g}
- Myllocerus australis Boisduval, 1835^{c g}
- Myllocerus bacchus Voss, 1949^{c g}
- Myllocerus baeodontomerus Lea, 1915^{c g}
- Myllocerus basicollis Lea, 1911^{c g}
- Myllocerus bayeri Hustache, 1924^{c g}
- Myllocerus bechynei (Voss, 1956)^{c g}
- Myllocerus benignus Faust, 1892^{c g}
- Myllocerus bhutanensis Nathan, 1992^{c g}
- Myllocerus bidentatus Pic, 1926^{c g}
- Myllocerus bifasciatipennis Lea, 1925^{c g}
- Myllocerus bilineater Lea, 1915^{c g}
- Myllocerus blandus Faust, 1894^{c g}
- Myllocerus boranus Gestro, 1895^{c g}
- Myllocerus boviei Marshall, 1916^{c g}
- Myllocerus bozasi Hustache, 1922^{c g}
- Myllocerus brevicollis Boheman, 1842^{c g}
- Myllocerus brevirostris Marshall, 1941^{c g}
- Myllocerus brunneus Matsumura, 1910^{c g}
- Myllocerus calosicollis Hustache, 1934^{c g}
- Myllocerus camerunensis Hustache, 1932^{c g}
- Myllocerus canalicornis Lea, 1909^{c g}
- Myllocerus canaliculatus Boheman, 1843^{c g}
- Myllocerus canalistriatus Ramamurthy & Ghai, 1988^{c g}
- Myllocerus canoxoides Kono, 1930^{c g}
- Myllocerus cardoni Marshall, 1916^{c g}
- Myllocerus carinatus Lea, 1904^{c g}
- Myllocerus caspius Stierlin, 1883^{c g}
- Myllocerus castor Lea, 1909^{c g}
- Myllocerus catechu Marshall, 1913^{c g}
- Myllocerus celatus (Voss, 1974)^{c g}
- Myllocerus cephalotes Hustache, 1924^{c g}
- Myllocerus championi Ramamurthy & Ghai, 1998^{c g}
- Myllocerus chaunoderus Lea, 1925^{c g}
- Myllocerus chevalieri Hustache, 1921^{c g}
- Myllocerus chobauti Desbrochers des Loges, 1897^{c g}
- Myllocerus cinerascens Pascoe, 1869^{c g}
- Myllocerus cinereidorsum Desbrochers des Loges, 1903^{c g}
- Myllocerus circumcinctus Hustache, 1922^{c g}
- Myllocerus clanculus Voss, 1962^{c g}
- Myllocerus coimbatorensis Ramamurthy & Ghai, 1988^{c g}
- Myllocerus confinis Lea, 1914^{c g}
- Myllocerus congoanus Hustache, 1921^{c g}
- Myllocerus conoixoides Kono, 1930^{c g}
- Myllocerus conradti Hustache, 1932^{c g}
- Myllocerus consocius Marshall, 1916^{c g}
- Myllocerus conspersus Marshall, 1916^{c g}
- Myllocerus constricticollis Lea, 1914^{c g}
- Myllocerus corycaeus Boheman, 1843^{c g}
- Myllocerus crinitus Marshall, 1916^{c g}
- Myllocerus curtipennis Pic, 1903^{c g}
- Myllocerus curvicornis (Fabricius, 1792)^{c g}
- Myllocerus cyrtops Lea, 1914^{c g}
- Myllocerus dalbergiae Ramamurthy & Ghai, 1988^{c g}
- Myllocerus damascenus Miller, 1861^{c g}
- Myllocerus darwini Blackburn, 1889^{c g}
- Myllocerus debilis Fairmaire, 1892^{c g}
- Myllocerus decipiens Lea, 1925^{c g}
- Myllocerus decorsei Hustache, 1920^{c g}
- Myllocerus decretus Pascoe, 1869^{c g}
- Myllocerus delicatulus (Fåhraeus, 1871)^{c g}
- Myllocerus denigrator Hustache, 1936^{c g}
- Myllocerus dentifer (Fabricius, 1792)^{c g}
- Myllocerus desquamatus Marshall, 1916^{c g}
- Myllocerus discolor Boheman, 1834^{c g}
- Myllocerus doddi Lea, 1914^{c g}
- Myllocerus dohrni Faust, 1890^{c g}
- Myllocerus dorsatus (Fabricius, 1798)^{c g}
- Myllocerus dorsocinnamomeus (Voss, 1962)^{c g}
- Myllocerus durus (Voss, 1937)^{c g}
- Myllocerus echinarius Marshall, 1916^{c g}
- Myllocerus echinatus Lea, 1905^{c g}
- Myllocerus ekonaensis Hustache, 1938^{c g}
- Myllocerus elegans Lea, 1905^{c g}
- Myllocerus elendeensis Hustache, 1935^{c g}
- Myllocerus equinus Ramamurthy & Ghai, 1988^{c g}
- Myllocerus erinaceus (Faust, 1892)^{c g}
- Myllocerus erlangeri (Voss, 1949)^{c g}
- Myllocerus evasus Marshall, 1916^{c g}
- Myllocerus exilis Lea, 1905^{c g}
- Myllocerus eximius Boheman, 1834^{c g}
- Myllocerus exoletus (Voss, 1958)^{c g}
- Myllocerus fabricii Guerin-Meneville, 1843^{c g}
- Myllocerus fallaciosus (Voss, 1958)^{c g}
- Myllocerus fotedari Ahmad, 1974^{c g}
- Myllocerus foveiceps Lea, 1909^{c g}
- Myllocerus foveicollis Voss, 1932^{c g}
- Myllocerus foveifrons Lea, 1911^{c g}
- Myllocerus fringilla Faust, 1897^{c g}
- Myllocerus fugitivus Lea, 1914^{c g}
- Myllocerus fuscomaculatus Lea, 1915^{c g}
- Myllocerus ganalensis Gestro, 1895^{c g}
- Myllocerus ginfushanensis Voss, 1933^{c g}
- Myllocerus glaucinus Pascoe, 1869^{c g}
- Myllocerus gracilis Marshall, 1916^{c g}
- Myllocerus grahami Ramamurthy & Ghai, 1998^{c g}
- Myllocerus guineaensis (Voss, 1949)^{c g}
- Myllocerus guttulus Matsumura, 1910^{c g}
- Myllocerus hampsoni Ramamurthy & Ghai, 1988^{c g}
- Myllocerus herbaceus Pascoe, 1869^{c g}
- Myllocerus herbivorus Lea, 1925^{c g}
- Myllocerus hilleri Faust, 1889^{i}
- Myllocerus hilli Lea, 1914^{c g}
- Myllocerus hinnulus Faust, 1894^{c g}
- Myllocerus hispidus Marshall, 1916^{c g}
- Myllocerus horridulus Marshall, 1944^{c g}
- Myllocerus hustachei Lona, 1936^{c g}
- Myllocerus ignavus Marshall, 1916^{c g}
- Myllocerus impallescens Marshall, 1916^{c g}
- Myllocerus impeditus Hustache, 1932^{c g}
- Myllocerus impressicollis Marshall, 1916^{c g}
- Myllocerus impressithorax Hustache, 1924^{c g}
- Myllocerus improvidus Marshall, 1916^{c g}
- Myllocerus incanus Voss, 1956^{c g}
- Myllocerus incertus Marshall, 1947^{c g}
- Myllocerus incisicollis (Lea, 1909)^{c g}
- Myllocerus indigoferae Hoffmann, 1962^{c g}
- Myllocerus ineptus Marshall, 1916^{c g}
- Myllocerus inermipes Lea, 1929^{c g}
- Myllocerus inermis Aurivillius, 1913^{c g}
- Myllocerus infaustus Marshall, 1946^{c g}
- Myllocerus inflatus (Voss, 1937)^{c g}
- Myllocerus inquietus Voss, 1937^{c g}
- Myllocerus intercoxalis Lea, 1914^{c g}
- Myllocerus interruptus Faust, 1895^{c g}
- Myllocerus kaeshoveni Marshall, 1926^{c g}
- Myllocerus kalukembensis Hustache, 1935^{c g}
- Myllocerus kankundanus (Voss, 1962)^{c g}
- Myllocerus kashmirensis Marshall, 1916^{c g}
- Myllocerus katanganus Hustache, 1934^{c g}
- Myllocerus khayesicus Hustache, 1932^{c g}
- Myllocerus laetivirens Marshall, 1916^{c g}
- Myllocerus lateralis Chevrolat, 1882^{c g}
- Myllocerus latibasis Lea, 1914^{c g}
- Myllocerus laticollis Lea, 1905^{c g}
- Myllocerus lecideosus (Pascoe, 1870)^{c g}
- Myllocerus lefroyi Marshall, 1916^{c g}
- Myllocerus liesenfeldti Voss, 1959^{c g}
- Myllocerus lineaticollis (Boheman, 1843)^{c g}
- Myllocerus lineatus (Marshall, 1941)^{c g}
- Myllocerus lodosi Osella, 1977^{c g}
- Myllocerus longicornis (Pascoe, 1869)^{c g}
- Myllocerus longipilis Hustache, 1922^{c g}
- Myllocerus longus Lea, 1914^{c g}
- Myllocerus lucens Marshall, 1943^{c g}
- Myllocerus luctuosus Desbrochers, 1891^{c g}
- Myllocerus luridus (Voss, 1949)^{c g}
- Myllocerus maculatus (Blackburn, 1892)^{c g}
- Myllocerus madurensis Marshall, 1916^{c g}
- Myllocerus magnificus Hustache, 1924^{c g}
- Myllocerus manipurensis Marshall, 1916^{c g}
- Myllocerus marshalli Lona, 1936^{c g}
- Myllocerus massaicus Hustache, 1921^{c g}
- Myllocerus mastersi Lea, 1911^{c g}
- Myllocerus mateui Hoffmann, 1964^{c g}
- Myllocerus mayarami Ramamurthy & Ghai, 1988^{c g}
- Myllocerus melvillensis Lea, 1914^{c g}
- Myllocerus menoni Ramamurthy & Ghai, 1988^{c g}
- Myllocerus methneri (Voss, 1949)^{c g}
- Myllocerus micros Hustache, 1934^{c g}
- Myllocerus minusculus Lea, 1914^{c g}
- Myllocerus mirabilis Lea, 1911^{c g}
- Myllocerus morio Boheman, 1834^{c g}
- Myllocerus multimaculatus Lea, 1911^{c g}
- Myllocerus mundus Voss, 1932^{c g}
- Myllocerus mystacinus Marshall, 1944^{c g}
- Myllocerus nasutus Pascoe, 1869^{c g}
- Myllocerus necopinus Marshall, 1916^{c g}
- Myllocerus nemorosus Hustache, 1924^{c g}
- Myllocerus neosordidus Ramamurthy & Ghai, 1988^{c g}
- Myllocerus nepalensis Ramamurthy & Ghai, 1988^{c g}
- Myllocerus niger Aurivillius, 1912^{c g}
- Myllocerus nigrosuturatus Marshall, 1916^{c g}
- Myllocerus niveus Lea, 1905^{c g}
- Myllocerus nodicollis Marshall, 1916^{c g}
- Myllocerus nuristanicus Voss, 1959^{c g}
- Myllocerus obliquifasciatus Lea, 1917^{c g}
- Myllocerus obockianus Reitter, 1906^{c g}
- Myllocerus obscurus Lea, 1925^{c g}
- Myllocerus ochraceus Magnano, 2009^{c g}
- Myllocerus paetus Marshall, 1916^{c g}
- Myllocerus pallidicolor Hustache, 1934^{c g}
- Myllocerus parvicollis Voss, 1949^{c g}
- Myllocerus pauculus Voss, 1934^{c g}
- Myllocerus pauper Faust, 1897^{c g}
- Myllocerus pennatus Formánek, 1922^{c g}
- Myllocerus perarmatus Lea, 1929^{c g}
- Myllocerus perilis Voss, 1965^{c g}
- Myllocerus persimilis Hustache, 1921^{c g}
- Myllocerus perversus Hustache, 1921^{c g}
- Myllocerus phariseus Hustache, 1922^{c g}
- Myllocerus pictus Lea, 1925^{c g}
- Myllocerus pilifer Faust, 1897^{c g}
- Myllocerus planoculis Marshall, 1916^{c g}
- Myllocerus plebejus Hartmann, 1904^{c g}
- Myllocerus plutus Voss, 1958^{c g}
- Myllocerus pollux Lea, 1909^{c g}
- Myllocerus polylineatus Hustache, 1921^{c g}
- Myllocerus postfasciatus Marshall, 1916^{c g}
- Myllocerus posthi (Hustache, 1921)^{c g}
- Myllocerus posttibialis Voss, 1962^{c g}
- Myllocerus pracuae Faust, 1891^{c g}
- Myllocerus pretiosus Faust, 1897^{c g}
- Myllocerus procerus Faust, 1897^{c g}
- Myllocerus prosabulosus Ramamurthy & Ghai, 1988^{c g}
- Myllocerus prosternalis Lea, 1914^{c g}
- Myllocerus proteus Hustache, 1929^{c g}
- Myllocerus pruinosus Blanchard, 1853^{c g}
- Myllocerus pteroderes Lea, 1929^{c g}
- Myllocerus pubescens Faust, 1894^{c g}
- Myllocerus pulchellus Formánek, 1922^{c g}
- Myllocerus pumilus Marshall, 1916^{c g}
- Myllocerus quadricolor Lea, 1917^{c g}
- Myllocerus raddensis Pic, 1904^{c g}
- Myllocerus ravillus Voss, 1961^{c g}
- Myllocerus reitteri Kirsch, 1879^{c g}
- Myllocerus retratiens Walker, 1859^{c g}
- Myllocerus richardi Nathan in Ramamurthy et al., 1992^{c g}
- Myllocerus robusticeps Pic, 1903^{c g}
- Myllocerus rodhaini Hustache, 1924^{c g}
- Myllocerus rosae Ramamurthy & Ghai, 1988^{c g}
- Myllocerus roscidus Marshall, 1916^{c g}
- Myllocerus roseus Hustache, 1922^{c g}
- Myllocerus ruandanus Hustache, 1934^{c g}
- Myllocerus rubiginosus Hustache, 1922^{c g}
- Myllocerus rufescens Ramamurthy & Ghai, 1988^{c g}
- Myllocerus rugicollis Lea, 1905^{c g}
- Myllocerus rusticus Pascoe, 1869^{c g}
- Myllocerus sabulosus Marshall, 1916^{c g}
- Myllocerus salemensis Marshall, 1943^{c g}
- Myllocerus satunini Suvorov, 1915^{c g}
- Myllocerus scapularis Roelofs, 1880^{c g}
- Myllocerus schimperi Hustache, 1936^{c g}
- Myllocerus scitulus Lea, 1925^{c g}
- Myllocerus sericeus Faust, 1897^{c g}
- Myllocerus setistriatus Lea, 1914^{c g}
- Myllocerus setosus Kono, 1930^{c g}
- Myllocerus setulifer Desbrochers des Loges, 1899^{c g}
- Myllocerus severini Marshall, 1916^{c g}
- Myllocerus seydeli Voss, 1949^{c g}
- Myllocerus sibiricus Tournier, 1879^{c g}
- Myllocerus simplex Faust, 1897^{c g}
- Myllocerus singularis (Voss, 1949)^{c g}
- Myllocerus sitonoides Hoffmann, 1963^{c g}
- Myllocerus smaragdinus Marshall, 1916^{c g}
- Myllocerus sordidus Lea, 1905^{c g}
- Myllocerus speciosus Blackburn, 1894^{c g}
- Myllocerus spectator Marshall, 1916^{c g}
- Myllocerus spinicollis Marshall, 1941^{c g}
- Myllocerus spurius Faust, 1895^{c g}
- Myllocerus squamicornis Lea, 1914^{c g}
- Myllocerus stolzi Voss, 1949^{c g}
- Myllocerus strangulaticollis Magnano, 2009^{c g}
- Myllocerus striatifrons Marshall, 1941^{c g}
- Myllocerus strigilatus (Voss, 1937)^{c g}
- Myllocerus suavis Faust, 1897^{c g}
- Myllocerus subcostatus Kolenati, 1858^{c g}
- Myllocerus subcruciatus Voss, 1934^{c g}
- Myllocerus subglaber Faust, 1897^{c g}
- Myllocerus subglaucus Marshall, 1916^{c g}
- Myllocerus subnubilis (Voss, 1952)^{c g}
- Myllocerus subrostralis Lea, 1914^{c g}
- Myllocerus sulcicornis Lea, 1915^{c g}
- Myllocerus superelegans Hustache, 1932^{c g}
- Myllocerus susainathani Nathan in Ramamurthy et al., 1992^{c g}
- Myllocerus suspiciens Marshall, 1916^{c g}
- Myllocerus suturalis Lea, 1905^{c g}
- Myllocerus suturellus (Voss, 1949)^{c g}
- Myllocerus szetschuanus Voss, 1933^{c g}
- Myllocerus tatei Blackburn, 1896^{c g}
- Myllocerus tavetanus Hustache, 1929^{c g}
- Myllocerus taylori Lea, 1909^{c g}
- Myllocerus terreus (Pascoe, 1869)^{c g}
- Myllocerus tessellatus Aurivillius, 1912^{c g}
- Myllocerus thandiyaniensis Rizvi, Ahmed et Naz, 2002^{c g}
- Myllocerus thompsoni Ramamurthy & Ghai, 1988^{c g}
- Myllocerus tibialis (Voss, 1949)^{c g}
- Myllocerus togoensis (Voss, 1949)^{c g}
- Myllocerus torridus Blackburn, 1894^{c g}
- Myllocerus transmarinus (Herbst, 1795)^{c g}
- Myllocerus trepidus Pascoe, 1885^{c g}
- Myllocerus tricarinirostris Lea, 1925^{c g}
- Myllocerus trifasciatus Voss, 1932^{c g}
- Myllocerus trifolii Hoffmann, 1964^{c g}
- Myllocerus trilineatus Lea, 1905^{c g}
- Myllocerus trisinuatus Lea, 1929^{c g}
- Myllocerus tristis Lea, 1914^{c g}
- Myllocerus tusicollis Marshall, 1916^{c g}
- Myllocerus uamensis (Voss, 1949)^{c g}
- Myllocerus undatus Marshall, 1916^{c g}
- Myllocerus undecimpustulatus Faust, J., 1891^{c g b} (sri lanka weevil)
- Myllocerus uniformis (Voss, 1949)^{c g}
- Myllocerus upembaensis Voss, 1962^{c g}
- Myllocerus usitatus Lea, 1904^{c g}
- Myllocerus valparensis Ramamurthy & Ghai, 1988^{c g}
- Myllocerus vanderijsti Hustache, 1924^{c g}
- Myllocerus varius Lea, 1914^{c g}
- Myllocerus veterator Hustache, 1936^{c g}
- Myllocerus villosipennis Lea, 1917^{c g}
- Myllocerus virens Voss, 1949^{c g}
- Myllocerus viridanus (Fabricius, 1775)^{c g}
- Myllocerus viridimicans Lea, 1917^{c g}
- Myllocerus viridiornatus Voss, 1934^{c g}
- Myllocerus viridipictus (Lea, 1909)^{c g}
- Myllocerus viridis Aurivillius, 1912^{c g}
- Myllocerus vonguensis Hustache, 1932^{c g}
- Myllocerus yeboensis Hustache, 1934^{c g}
- Myllocerus zeylanicus Marshall, 1916^{c g}
- Myllocerus zopherus Lea, 1917^{c g}

sri lanka weevil Data sources: i = ITIS, c = Catalogue of Life, g = GBIF, b = Bugguide.net
