= List of sorghum diseases =

This article is a list of diseases of sorghum (Sorghum bicolor).

== Bacterial ==
Bacterial diseases
Bacterial leaf spot	Pseudomonas syringae
Bacterial leaf streak	Xanthomonas campestris pv. holcicola
Bacterial leaf stripe	Burkholderia andropogonis

== Fungi ==
Fungal diseases
Acremonium wilt	Acremonium strictum = Cephalosporium acremonium
Anthracnose (foliar, head, root and stalk rot)	Colletotrichum graminicola Glomerella graminicola [teleomorph]
Charcoal rot	Macrophomina phaseolina
Crazy top downy mildew	Sclerophthora macrospora = Sclerospora macrospora
Damping-off and seed rot	Aspergillus spp. Exserohilum spp. Fusarium spp. Penicillium spp. Pythium spp. Rhizoctonia spp. and other species.
Ergot	Sphacelia sorghi Claviceps sorghi [teleomorph]
Fusarium head blight, root and stalk rot	Fusarium moniliforme Gibberella fujikuroi [teleomorph] Other Fusarium spp.
Grain storage mold	Aspergillus spp. Penicillium spp. and other species.
Gray leaf spot	Cercospora sorghi
Latter leaf spot	Cercospora fusimaculans
Leaf blight	Setosphaeria turcica = Exserohilum turcicum [anamorph] = Helminthosporium turcicum
Milo disease (Periconia root rot)	Periconia circinata
Oval leaf spot	Ramulispora sorghicola
Pokkah Boeng (twisted top)	Gibberella fujikuroi var. subglutinans = Fusarium moniliforme var. subglutinans [anamorph]
Pythium root rot	Pythium graminicola Other Pythium spp.
Rough leaf spot	Ascochyta sorghi
Rust	Puccinia purpurea
Seedling blight and seed rot	Colletotrichum graminicola Exserohilum turcicum Fusarium moniliforme Pythium aphanidermatum Other Pythium spp.
Smut, covered kernel	Sporisorium sorghi = Sphacelotheca sorghi
Smut, head	Sphacelotheca reiliana = S. holci-sorghi
Smut, loose kernel	Sporisorium cruentum = S. cruenta
Sooty stripe	Ramulispora sorghi
Sorghum downy mildew	Peronosclerospora sorghi = Sclerospora sorghi
Tar spot	Phyllachora sacchari
Target leaf spot	Bipolaris cookei = Helminthosporium cookei
Zonate leaf spot and sheath blight	Gloeocercospora sorghi

== Nematodes ==
Nematodes, parasitic
Awl	Dolichodorus spp.
Dagger, American	Xiphinema americanum
Lesion	Pratylenchus spp.
Needle	Longidorus africanus and other species
Pin	Paratylenchus spp.
Reniform	Rotylenchus spp.
Ring	Criconemella spp.
Root-knot	Meloidogyne spp.
Spiral	Helicotylenchus spp.
Sting	Belonolaimus longicaudatus
Stubby-root	Paratrichodorus spp. Paratrichodorus minor
Stunt	Tylenchorhynchus spp. Merlinius brevidens

== Viruses ==
Viral diseases
Maize chlorotic dwarf	Maize chlorotic dwarf virus
Maize dwarf mosaic	Maize dwarf mosaic virus
Sugarcane mosaic	Sugarcane mosaic virus

== Phytoplasma ==
Viral diseases
Yellow sorghum stunt	Yellow sorghum stunt phytoplasma

== Insects ==
Insect pests include:

=== Root feeders ===
- White grubs
  - Holotrichia serrata
  - Lachnosterna consanguinea
- wireworms (Elateridae, Tenebrionidae)
- underground burrowing bugs, Stibaropus spp.
- termites
  - Odontotermes spp.
  - Microtermes sp.
- ants
  - Monomorium salomonis
  - Pheidole sulcaticeps

=== Seedling pests ===
- shoot fly, Atherigona soccata
- cutworm, Agrotis ipsilon

=== Stem borers and leaf feeders ===
- spotted stalk borer, Chilo partellus
- pink borer, Sesamia inferens
- armyworm, Mythimna separata
- Spodoptera exempta
- caterpillars Amsacta albistriga, Amsacta lactinea, Euproctis virguncula, Cnaphalocrocis patnalis, and Mocis frugalis
- chrysomelid leaf beetles Chaetocnema indica, Longitarsus spp., and Phyllotreta chotonica
- ash weevil Myllocerus undecimpustulatus maculosus
- grasshoppers, Nomadacris septemfasciata, Acrida exaltata, Aiolopus longicornis, Aiolopus simulatrix, Aiolopus thalassinus, Atractomorpha crenulata, Chrotogonus hemipterus, Diabolocatantops axillaris, Hieroglyphus banian, and Hieroglyphus nigrorepletus
- grasshopper Conocephalus maculatus (eastern India)
- grasshopper Hieroglyphus nigrorepletus (western India)

=== Sucking pests ===
- shoot bug Peregrinus maidis (transmits two viral diseases, maize mosaic virus (MMV) and maize stripe virus (MStpV))
- corn aphid Rhopalosiphum maidis
- sugarcane leafhopper Pyrilla perpusilla
- hemipterous bugs, Cletus punctiger, Dolycoris indicus, Empoasca flavescens, Lygaeus spp., Menida histrio, Nephotettix virescens, and Nezara viridula
- thrips, especially Caliothrips indicus, Sorghothrips jonnaphilus

=== Earhead pests ===
- sorghum midge Stenodiplosis sorghicola
- earhead bug Calocoris angustatus
- bugs, like Dysdercus koenigii and Nezara viridula
- lepidopteran caterpillars are found feeding on developing grains: Autoba silicula, Cryptoblabes gnidiella, Cydia spp., Conogethes punctiferalis, Ephestia cautella, Eublemma spp., Euproctis limbata, Euproctis subnotata, Helicoverpa armigera
- maize cob borer Stenachroia elongella, especially in east India
- beetle species, Chiloloba acuta, Mylabris pustulata, and Cylindrothorax tenuicollis

=== Grain pests ===
- Sitophilus spp. (attacks stored grains)

=== Africa ===
The following pest species are reported for sorghum crops in northern Mali.

- Atherigona soccata (sorghum shoot fly, a major pest): The larvae cut the growing point of the sorghum leaf.
- Agonoscelis pubescens is also reported as a sorghum pest.
- Busseola fusca (maize stem-borer; Lepidoptera, Noctuidae) attacks maize and sorghum, and occurs especially at higher altitudes. It is a common pest in East Africa, but has also spread to West Africa.
- Chilo partellus (spotted stem-borer; Lepidoptera, Crambidae): introduced, from East Africa but spreading. The larvae attack sorghum and maize. Present at low and mid altitudes.
- Contarinia sorghicola (sorghum midge or cecidomyie du sorgho in French; Diptera, Cecidomyiidae): The adult resembles mosquitoes. Larvae feed on developing ovaries of sorghum grains.
- Melanaphis sacchari (sugar cane aphid) attacks sorghum.

Sitophilus zeamais (maize weevil) and Sitotroga cerealella (Angoumois grain moth) attack stored sorghum and maize.

== See also ==
- List of insect pests of millets
- List of pearl millet diseases
