= Myllocerus viridanus =

Scientific classification
- Kingdom: Animalia
- Phylum: Arthropoda
- Class: Insecta
- Order: Coleoptera
- Suborder: Polyphaga
- Infraorder: Cucujiformia
- Family: Curculionidae
- Genus: Myllocerus
- Species: M. viridanus

Binomial name
- Myllocerus viridanus Fabricius, 1775

Synonyms
- Curculio viridanus Fabricius, 1775; Myllocerus viridanus Boheman, 1834; Myllocerus angustifrons Faust, 1897

Species of beetle

Myllocerus viridanus, often known as sweet potato beetle, pod borer or ash weevil, is a species of weevil native to India and Sri Lanka.

== Description ==
This species has a body length is about 3 to 4.5 mm. Body black, with dense uniform light green scales. Sometimes color varying to pale greenish white with chalky-white efflorescence. Head with yellow and with metallic green scales at the apex of the rostrum. Head narrowed from back to front. Eyes dorsal. Forehead with a rounded impression. Rostrum evidently longer than the head. Mandibles reddish brown. Antennae black or piceous. Prothorax subconical. Elytral striae are very narrow and covered with fine longitudinal punctures. Legs black, with green scales.

== Biology ==
Adult weevils have been observed in numerous plants as they are known to defoliate the tender leaves and shoots extensively. Grubs feed on roots resulting in wilting of plants. Hence considered as serious polyphagous pest of economic importance.

Adults can be destroyed by using Beauveria bassiana, an entomopathogenic fungus.

=== Host plants ===
- Acacia auriculiformis
- Anacardium occidentale
- Arachis hypogaea
- Breynia retusa
- Calliandra calothyrsus
- Cassia aurantifolia
- Cassia fistula
- Citrus aurantifolia
- Citrus reticulata
- Corchorus olitorius
- Desmodium
- Erythrina stricta
- Eucalyptus robusta
- Eugenia jambolana
- Eupatorium odoratum
- Ficus exasperata
- Gliricidia sepium
- Gloriosa superba
- Helianthus annuus
- Hibiscus rosa-sinensis
- Ipomoea batatas
- Macaranga peltata
- Mallotus philippensis
- Malpighia emarginata
- Mangifera indica
- Millettia pinnata
- Moringa pterygosperma
- Morus alba
- Murraya koenigii
- Mussaenda frondosa
- Plumbago
- Populus deltoides
- Rosa × odorata
- Sapindus trifoliatus
- Senna auriculata
- Senna hirsuta
- Senna tora
- Sida acuta
- Sida rhombifolia
- Solanum melongena
- Solanum violaceum
- Sorghum bicolor
- Spinacia oleracea
- Tamarindus indica
- Tectona grandis
- Terminalia arjuna
- Terminalia tomentosa
- Theobroma cacao
- Ziziphus oenoplia
