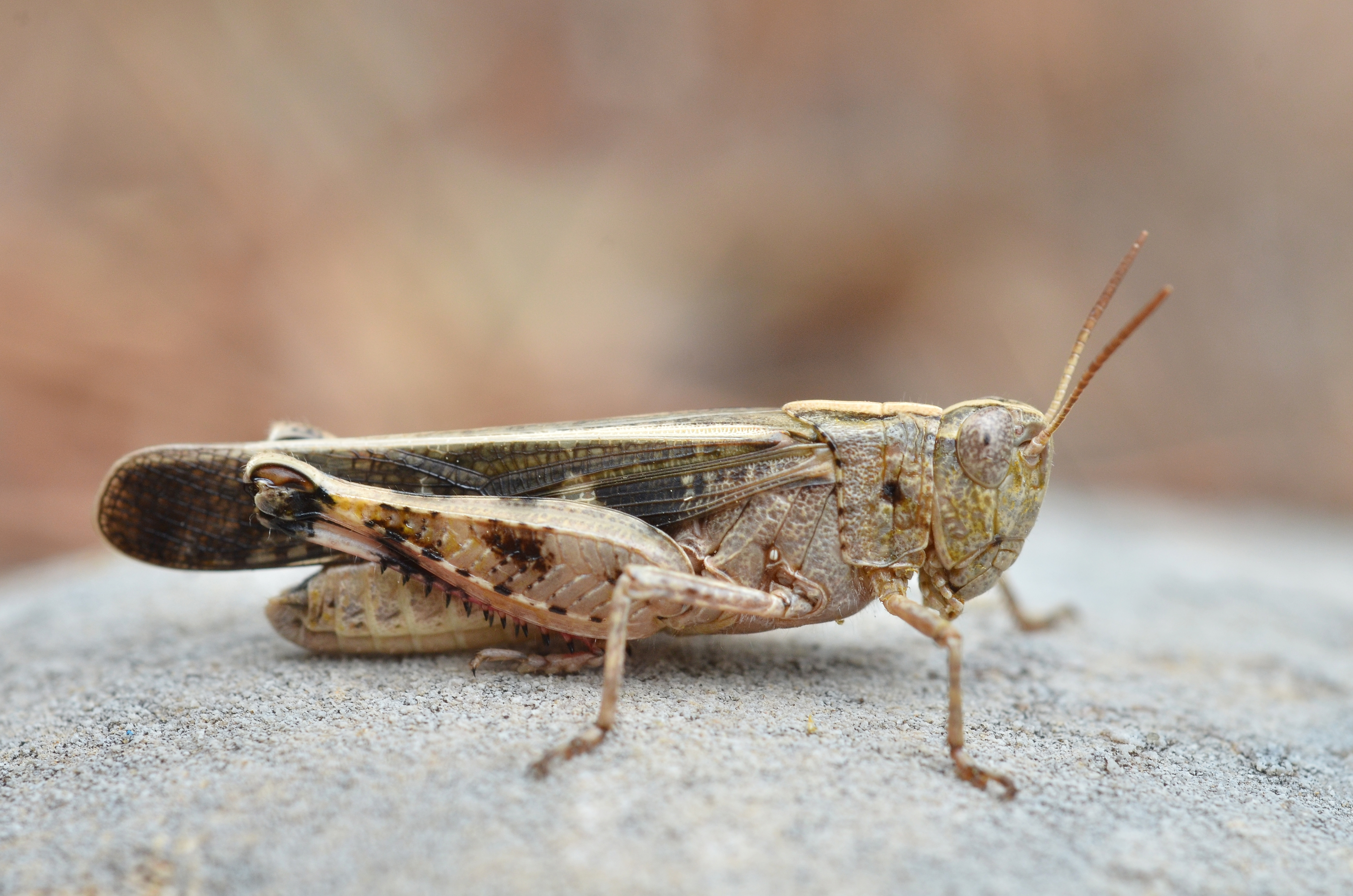
- Aiolopus strepens. Male
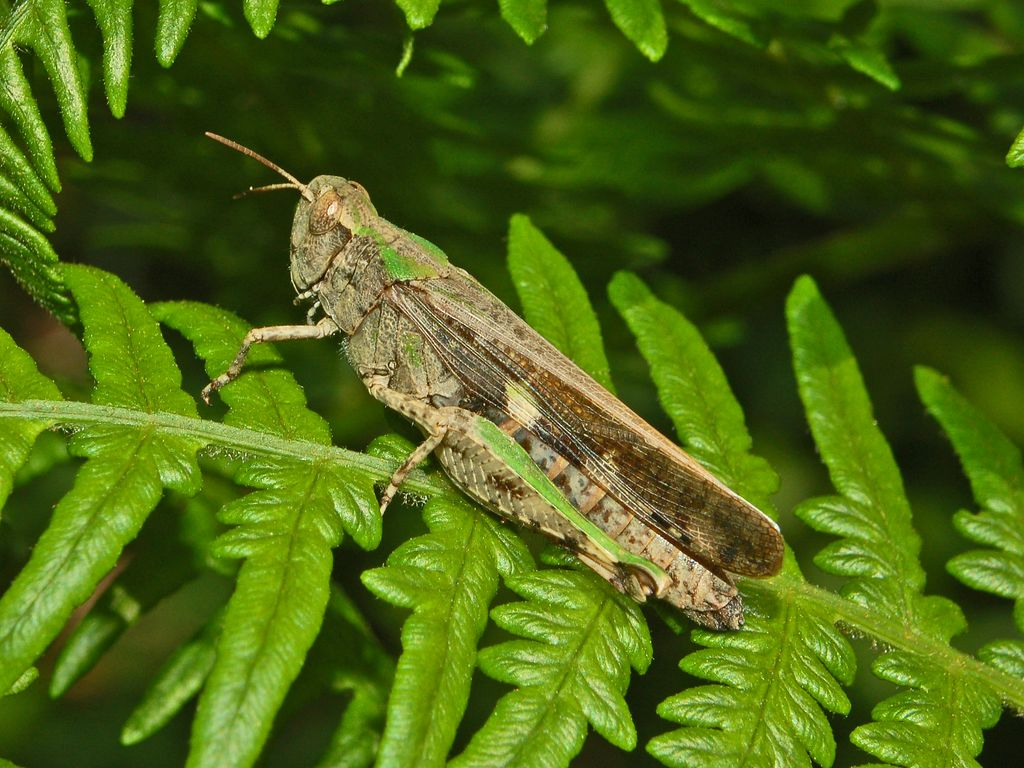
- Female

Scientific classification
- Kingdom: Animalia
- Phylum: Arthropoda
- Clade: Pancrustacea
- Class: Insecta
- Order: Orthoptera
- Suborder: Caelifera
- Family: Acrididae
- Subfamily: Oedipodinae
- Tribe: Epacromiini
- Genus: Aiolopus
- Species: A. strepens

Binomial name
- Aiolopus strepens (Latreille, 1804)
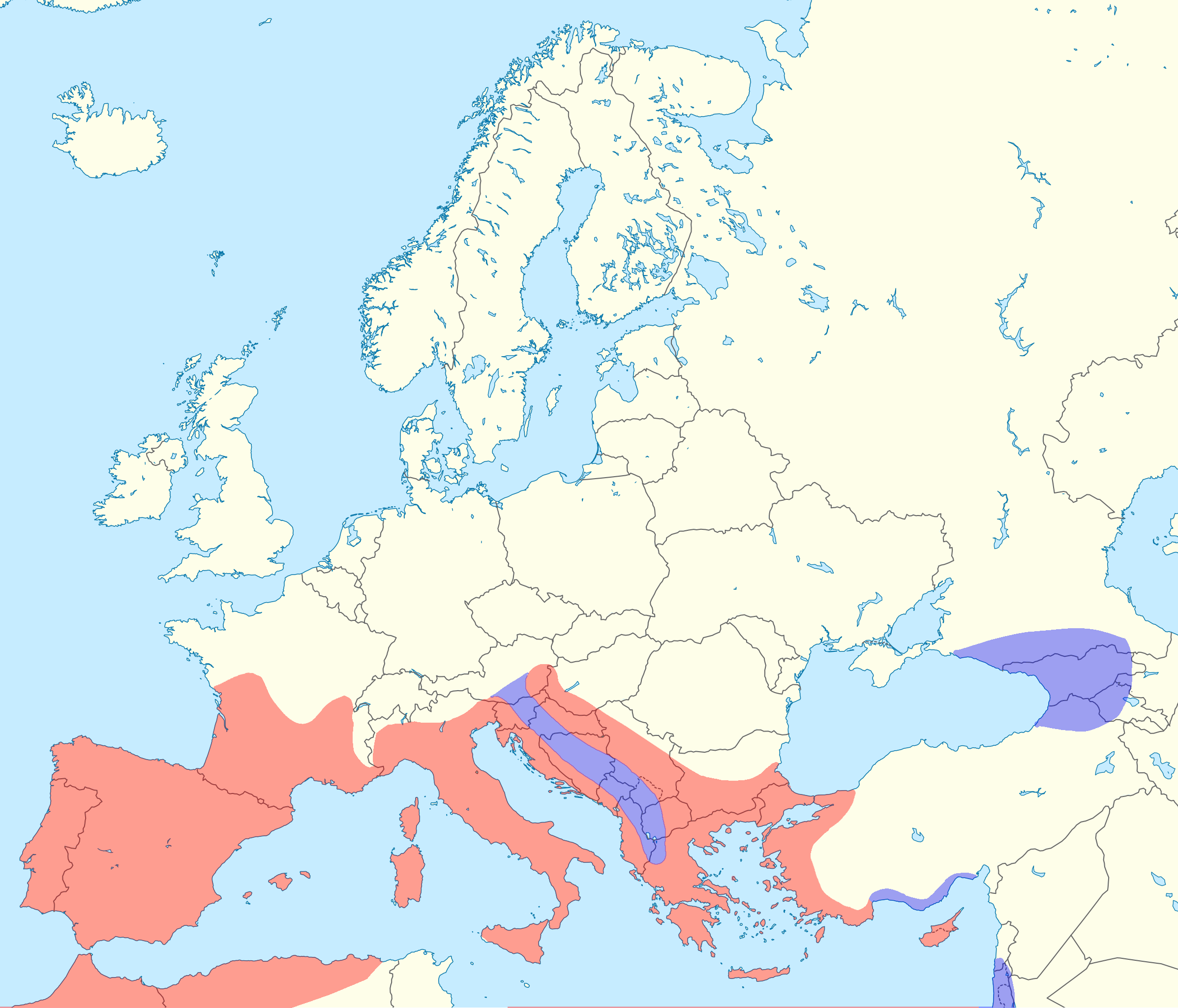
- Red - confirmed distribution; Blue - unconfirmed distribution

Synonyms
- Aiolopus prasinus (Thunberg, 1815); Aiolopus vittatum (Brullé, 1840)

= Aiolopus strepens =

Species of grasshopper

Aiolopus strepens is a species of grasshopper belonging to the family Acrididae, subfamily Oedipodinae.

== Subspecies ==
Subspecies include:

- Aiolopus strepens alexandrei Defaut, 2017
- Aiolopus strepens chloroptera Ramme, 1913
- Aiolopus strepens cyanoptera Ramme, 1913
- Aiolopus strepens strepens (Latreille, 1804)

== Distribution ==
This species is present in central and southern Europe, in the Afrotropical realm, in the Near East and in North Africa.

== Habitat ==
This Mediterranean warmth-loving species usually inhabits dry environments, low vegetation with areas of free soil, bushes and stony soils.

== Description ==
The adult males grow up to 19–24 millimetres (0.75–0.94 in) long, while females reach 24–31 mm (0.94–1.22 in) long. The colouration of Aiolopus strepens is quite variable (green, yellow and brown). The basic color of their sturdy body is usually light brown, but sometimes is green or with some green areas or reddish stripes. There are also completely green colored insects, especially females.

The immature adults usually show the same brown colors, but when autumn arrives and the exoskeleton stiffens, the colors redefine and the green vanishes. In spring, with the breeding season, especially females regain green color and a more "complex" pattern.

Pronotum is almost flat and it is usually monochrome, rarely with a broad longitudinal stripe on the top, which continues on top of the head. Hind legs are relatively short. Antennas are shorter than the head and pronotum The tibiae of the hind legs are usually red and the femora are quite robust. The wings are transparent with a darkened brownish apex. The hind wings are often bluish at the base. The front wings (tegmina) are dark with clear markings.

This species is rather similar to Aiolopus thalassinus from which it differs for the larger posterior femora, the transparent-blue wings and the coarse punctuation in the posterior part of the pronotum.

== Biology ==
They can be encountered from July through October. After mating these grasshoppers overwinter as adults.
