= Myllocerus subfasciatus =

Scientific classification
- Kingdom: Animalia
- Phylum: Arthropoda
- Class: Insecta
- Order: Coleoptera
- Suborder: Polyphaga
- Infraorder: Cucujiformia
- Family: Curculionidae
- Genus: Myllocerus
- Species: M. subfasciatus

Binomial name
- Myllocerus subfasciatus Guerin, 1843

Synonyms
- Myllocerus spurcatus Walker, 1859; Myllocerus nubilosus Faust, 1897; Myllocerus mutabilis Faust, 1897; Myllocerus subfasciatus var spurcatus (Walker): Marshall, 1916; Myllocerus subfasciatus var. mutabilis (Faust): Marshall, 1916

Species of beetle

Myllocerus subfasciatus, is a species of weevil found in India, and Sri Lanka. The Sri Lankan population was earlier identified as a separate species, Myllocerus spurcatus.

== Description ==
Adult weevil light greyish to white with four black spots on the elytral covers. Eggs are light yellow and are laid deep in the soil. Eggs take 3 to 11 to hatch. Grub is small, apodous fleshy, and yellow in colour. Grub period is about 3 to 42. The final instar pupates in soil in earthen cocoons. The pupation period is 5 to 7 days.

Adults are known to attack brinjal. Common symptom is notching of leaf margins. Grubs generally feed on roots causing wilting.
