= Longidorus africanus =

Scientific classification
- Kingdom: Animalia
- Phylum: Nematoda
- Class: Enoplea
- Order: Dorylaimida
- Family: Longidoridae
- Genus: Longidorus
- Species: L. africanus

Binomial name
- Longidorus africanus Merny, 1966

Species of nematode worm

Longidorus africanus is a plant pathogenic nematode.

== See also ==
- List of sorghum diseases
