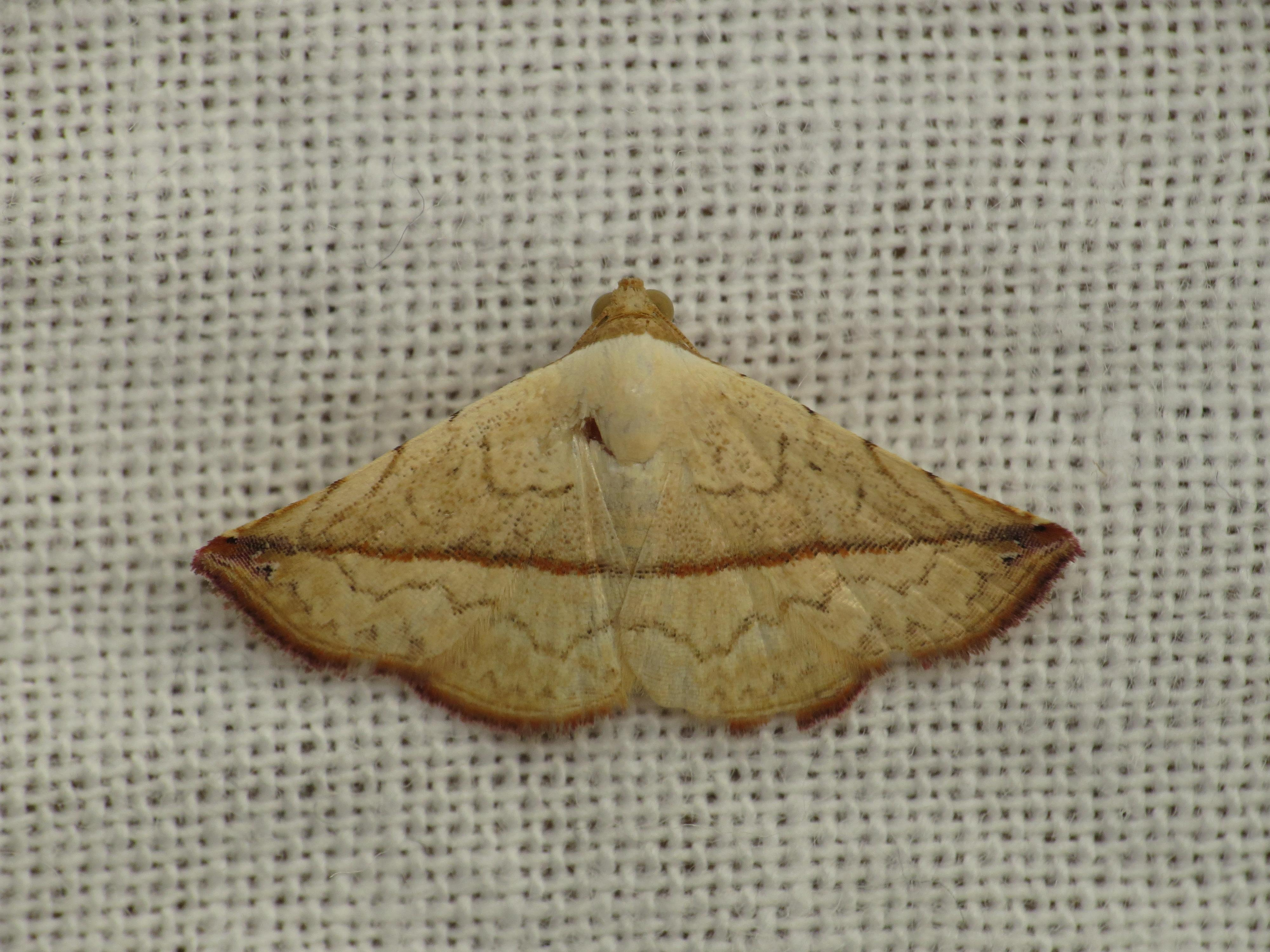
- Autoba versicolor

Scientific classification
- Kingdom: Animalia
- Phylum: Arthropoda
- Class: Insecta
- Order: Lepidoptera
- Superfamily: Noctuoidea
- Family: Erebidae
- Genus: Autoba
- Species: A. versicolor

Binomial name
- Autoba versicolor Walker, 1863

= Autoba versicolor =

Species of moth

Autoba versicolor, the flower webber, sometimes included in the genus Eublemma, is a species of moth of the family Erebidae. It was described by Francis Walker in 1863, from material collected by Alfred Russel Wallace in Sarawak on the island of Borneo. It is the type species of its genus.

== Description ==
The caterpillar has a light brown head and greenish yellow body, while adults have purplish-pink to light orange wings.

== Ecology ==
In the larval stage, this species is a pest of flowering crops, webbing together and eating flowers and young leaves, and creating bore holes in flower stalks.
