= Autoba brachygonia =

Scientific classification
- Kingdom: Animalia
- Phylum: Arthropoda
- Class: Insecta
- Order: Lepidoptera
- Superfamily: Noctuoidea
- Family: Erebidae
- Genus: Autoba
- Species: A. brachygonia

Binomial name
- Autoba brachygonia (Hampson, 1910)

Synonyms
- Eublemma brachygonia Hampson, 1910

Species of moth

Autoba brachygonia is a moth of the family Erebidae first described by George Hampson in 1910. It is found in Sri Lanka.
