= Autoba olivacea =

Scientific classification
- Kingdom: Animalia
- Phylum: Arthropoda
- Class: Insecta
- Order: Lepidoptera
- Superfamily: Noctuoidea
- Family: Erebidae
- Genus: Autoba
- Species: A. olivacea

Binomial name
- Autoba olivacea Walker, [1858]

Synonyms
- Acontia olivacea Walker, [1858]; Anthophila nebulifera Walker, 1865

Species of moth

Autoba olivacea, the brinjal leaf roller, is a moth of the family Erebidae. The species was first described by Francis Walker in 1858. It is found in several African countries such as Botswana, Eritrea, Madagascar, Malawi, Mozambique, Nigeria, South Africa, Tanzania, Uganda and Zimbabwe. It is also found in Sri Lanka. and India.

Larval food plants are Solanum melongena, Solamun pectinatum and Gossypium species.
