= Bipolaris cookei =

Scientific classification
- Kingdom: Fungi
- Division: Ascomycota
- Class: Dothideomycetes
- Order: Pleosporales
- Family: Pleosporaceae
- Genus: Bipolaris
- Species: B. cookei

Binomial name
- Bipolaris cookei (Sacc.) Shoemaker, (1959)

Synonyms
- Bipolaris sorghicola (Lefebvre & Sherwin) Alcorn (1983); Drechslera cookei (Sacc.) Subram. & B.L. Jain (1966); Drechslera sorghicola (Lefebvre & Sherwin) M.J. Richardson & E.M. Fraser (1968); Helminthosporium cookei Sacc. (1886); Helminthosporium sorghi Cooke (1874); Helminthosporium sorghicola Lefebvre & Sherwin (1949)

Species of fungus

Bipolaris cookei is a plant pathogen that affects sorghum, infecting leaf veins and lesions and causing target leaf spot. It is found in the United States, Sudan, Israel, Cyprus, South America, and India.
