= Myllocerus curvicornis =

Scientific classification
- Kingdom: Animalia
- Phylum: Arthropoda
- Clade: Pancrustacea
- Class: Insecta
- Order: Coleoptera
- Suborder: Polyphaga
- Infraorder: Cucujiformia
- Superfamily: Curculionoidea
- Family: Curculionidae
- Genus: Myllocerus
- Species: M. curvicornis

Binomial name
- Myllocerus curvicornis (Fabricius, 1792)

Synonyms
- Curculio curvicornis Fabricius, 1792; Myllocerus transmarinus Boheman, 1834

Species of beetle

Myllocerus curvicornis, commonly known as coconut ash weevil, is a species of weevil found in India and Sri Lanka.

== Description ==
This species has a body length is about 5 to 7.5 mm. Body black or piceous with grey and brown scales. Dorsal surface of the prothorax is dark brown with a narrow central pale brown line. Sometimes, prothorax is paler brown with a dark brown stripe laterally. Elytra dark or pale brown dorsally, with more or less small grey spot mottling. Sides of head, prothorax and elytra, and the ventrum are greyish or whitish. Elytral margins are with some brown spots. Eyes lateral, and the forehead is broad. Rostrum longer than the head and slightly dilated at the apex. Antennae piceous, with depressed grey setae. Prothorax transverse, with slightly rounded sides. Elytra rather broad with clear punctures. Elytral setae very short and recumbent. Legs piceous with grey scales.

Adult weevils are polyphagous that destroy foliage of the plants such as Cocos nucifera, Dalbergia sissoo, Theobroma cacao, Camellia sinensis, Psophocarpus tetragonolobus and Rosa.

In biological control, adults can be controlled by the natural predators such as Rhynocoris fuscipes.
