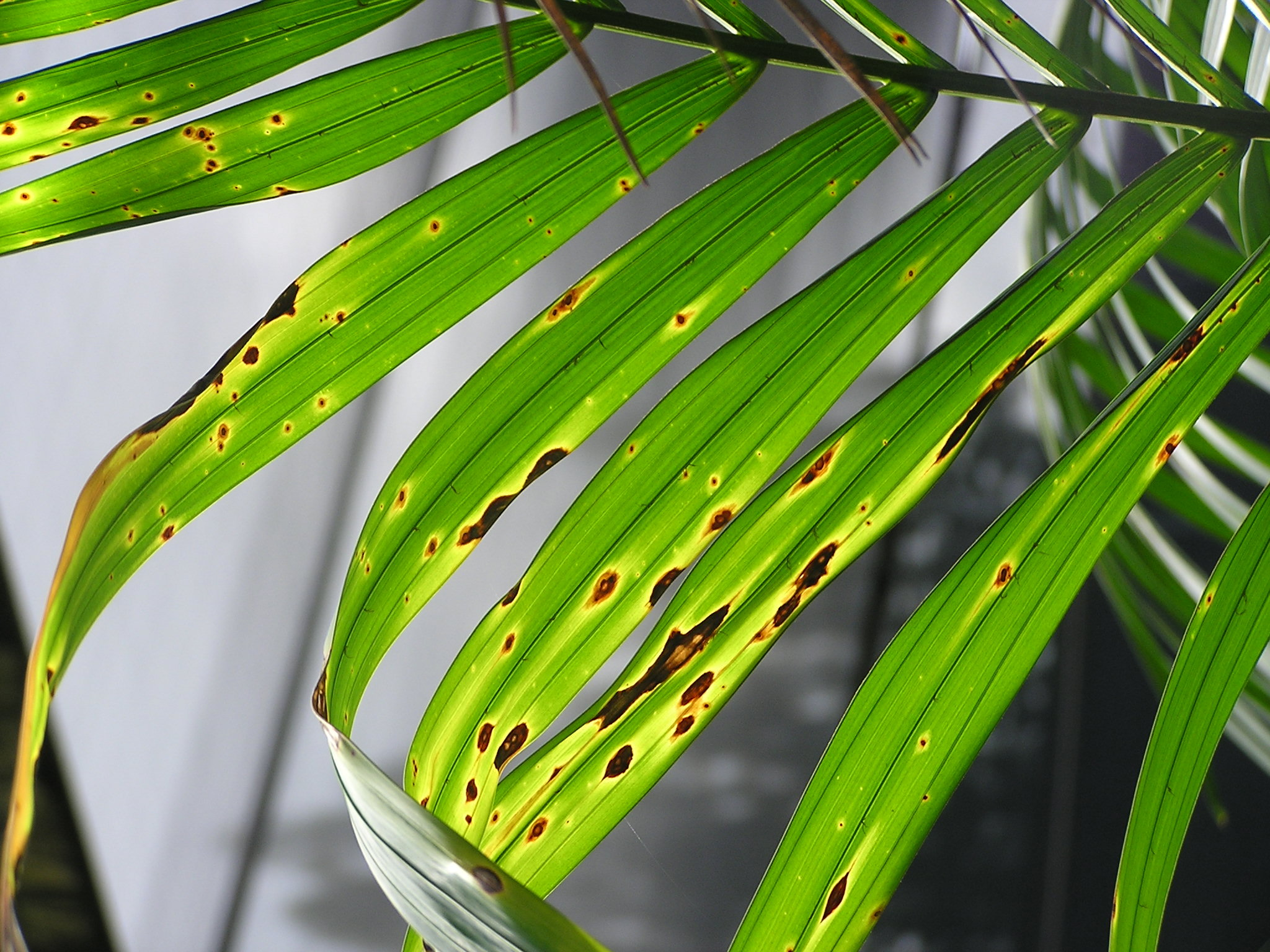
- Bipolaris leaf blight of kentia palm caused by Bipolaris incurvata

Scientific classification
- Domain: Eukaryota
- Kingdom: Fungi
- Division: Ascomycota
- Class: Dothideomycetes
- Order: Pleosporales
- Family: Pleosporaceae
- Genus: Bipolaris; Shoemaker (1959)

Type species
- Bipolaris maydis (Y.Nisik. & C.Miyake) Shoemaker (1959)

= Bipolaris =

Genus of fungi

Bipolaris is a genus of fungi belonging to the family Pleosporaceae. It was circumscribed by mycologist Robert A. Shoemaker in 1959.

It has a cosmopolitan distribution worldwide.

== Species ==
As of 9 August 2023, the GBIF lists up to 71 species, while Species Fungorum lists 78 species.

- Bipolaris alocasiae Wei Zhang, H. Deng & T.Y. Zhang (2012)
- Bipolaris austrostipae Y.P. Tan & R.G. Shivas (2016)
- Bipolaris axonopodicola Y.P. Tan & R.G. Shivas (2016)
- Bipolaris bamagaensis Y.P. Tan & R.G. Shivas (2016)
- Bipolaris bicolor (Mitra) Shoemaker (1959)
- Bipolaris brachiariae Y. Marín, Senwanna & Crous (2017)
- Bipolaris chloridis (Alcorn) Alcorn (1983)
- Bipolaris clavata Alcorn (1982)
- Bipolaris coffeana Sivan. (1985)
- Bipolaris coicis (Y. Nisik.) Shoemaker (1959)
- Bipolaris colocasiae (M.P. Tandon & V. Bhargava) Alcorn (1983)
- Bipolaris cookei (Sacc.) Shoemaker (1959)
- Bipolaris costina Sivan., R.S. Shukla, Kr.P. Singh & A. Husain (1985)
- Bipolaris crotonis Sivan. (1985)
- Bipolaris cynodontis (Marignoni) Shoemaker (1959)
- Bipolaris distoseptata M. Raza, K.D. Hyde & L. Cai (2019)
- Bipolaris drechsleri Manamgoda & Minnis (2013)
- Bipolaris eleusines J.H. Peng & J.Y. Lu (1989)
- Bipolaris eleusines Alcorn & R.G. Shivas (1990)
- Bipolaris eragrostiellae (A.P. Misra & R.A. Singh) Sivan. (1987)
- Bipolaris euchlaenae (Zimm.) Shoemaker (1959)
- Bipolaris flagelloidea (G.F. Atk.) Shoemaker (1959)
- Bipolaris fusca Y.L. Jiang & T.Y. Zhang (2008)
- Bipolaris gigantea (S. Ito) B. Lane, Stricker, M.E. Sm., S.L. Flory & Harmon (2020)
- Bipolaris glycines (S. Naray. & Durairaj) B.A. Khasanov (1992)
- Bipolaris gossypina Sivan. (1985)
- Bipolaris hadrotrichoides (Ellis & Everh.) Luttr. (1970)
- Bipolaris halepensis M.Y. Chiang, K.J. Leonard & Van Dyke (1989)
- Bipolaris heliconiae Alcorn (1996)
- Bipolaris heveae (Petch) Arx (1987)
- Bipolaris imperatae J.J. Muchovej (2012)
- Bipolaris incurvata (C. Bernard) Alcorn (1983)
- Bipolaris iridis (Oudem.) C.H. Dickinson (1966)
- Bipolaris israeli Steiman, Guiraud, Seigle-Mur. & Sage (1996)
- Bipolaris leersiae (G.F. Atk.) Shoemaker (1959)
- Bipolaris louisemackiae Y.P. Tan & R.G. Shivas (2023)
- Bipolaris marantae J.L. Alves & R.W. Barreto (2017)
- Bipolaris mariehareliae Y.P. Tan & Bishop-Hurley (2023)
- Bipolaris maryandersoniae Y.P. Tan, Bishop-Hurley & R.G. Shivas (2023)
- Bipolaris melinidis Alcorn (1982)
- Bipolaris microconidia M. Raza, K.D. Hyde & L. Cai (2019)
- Bipolaris microlaenae Alcorn (1990)
- Bipolaris microstegii Minnis, Rossman, Klecz. & S.L. Flory (2012)
- Bipolaris multiformis (Jooste) Alcorn (1983)
- Bipolaris novae-zelandiae Sivan. (1985)
- Bipolaris obclavata Sivan. (1992)
- Bipolaris obovoidea Wei Zhang & T.Y. Zhang (2012)
- Bipolaris olyrae (Viégas) Shoemaker (1959)
- Bipolaris omanensis Dughaishi, Maharachch. & Al-Sadi (2018)
- Bipolaris oryzae (Breda de Haan) Shoemaker (1959)
- Bipolaris pallescens Y.H. Geng & T.Y. Zhang (2014)
- Bipolaris palousensis R. Sprague (1961)
- Bipolaris panici-miliacei (Y. Nisik.) Shoemaker (1959)
- Bipolaris papendorfii (Aa) Alcorn (1983)
- Bipolaris peregianensis Alcorn (1982)
- Bipolaris poae-pratensis H. Deng & T.Y. Zhang (2002)
- Bipolaris prieskaensis W.Q. Chen & W.J. Swart (2000)
- Bipolaris rostratae Raghv. Singh & Shambhu Kumar (2016)
- Bipolaris sacchari (E.J. Butler) Shoemaker (1959)
- Bipolaris saccharicola Y. Marín & Crous (2017)
- Bipolaris salkadehensis Ahmadp. & Heidarian (2012)
- Bipolaris secalis Sisterna ex Y.P. Tan, Madrid, Crous & R.G. Shivas (2014)
- Bipolaris shoemakeri Y.P. Tan & R.G. Shivas (2016)
- Bipolaris simmondsii Y.P. Tan & R.G. Shivas (2016)
- Bipolaris sivanesaniana Y.P. Tan & R.G. Shivas (2016)
- Bipolaris sorokiniana Shoemaker (1959)
- Bipolaris stenospila (Drechsler ex Faris) Shoemaker (2018)
- Bipolaris subramanianii Y.P. Tan & R.G. Shivas (2016)
- Bipolaris triticicola Sivan. (1985)
- Bipolaris triticigrani (A.P. Misra & R.A. Singh) Sivan. (1987)
- Bipolaris urochloae (V.A. Putterill) Shoemaker (1959)
- Bipolaris variabilis Y. Marín, Y.P. Tan & Crous (2017)
- Bipolaris victoriae (F. Meehan & H.C. Murphy) Shoemaker (1959)
- Bipolaris woodii Y.P. Tan & R.G. Shivas (2016)
- Bipolaris xanthosomatis B. Huguenin (1966)
- Bipolaris zeae Sivan. (1985)
- Bipolaris zeicola (G.L. Stout) Shoemaker (1959)

See Species Fungorum website for a list of about 59 former species of Bipolaris.
