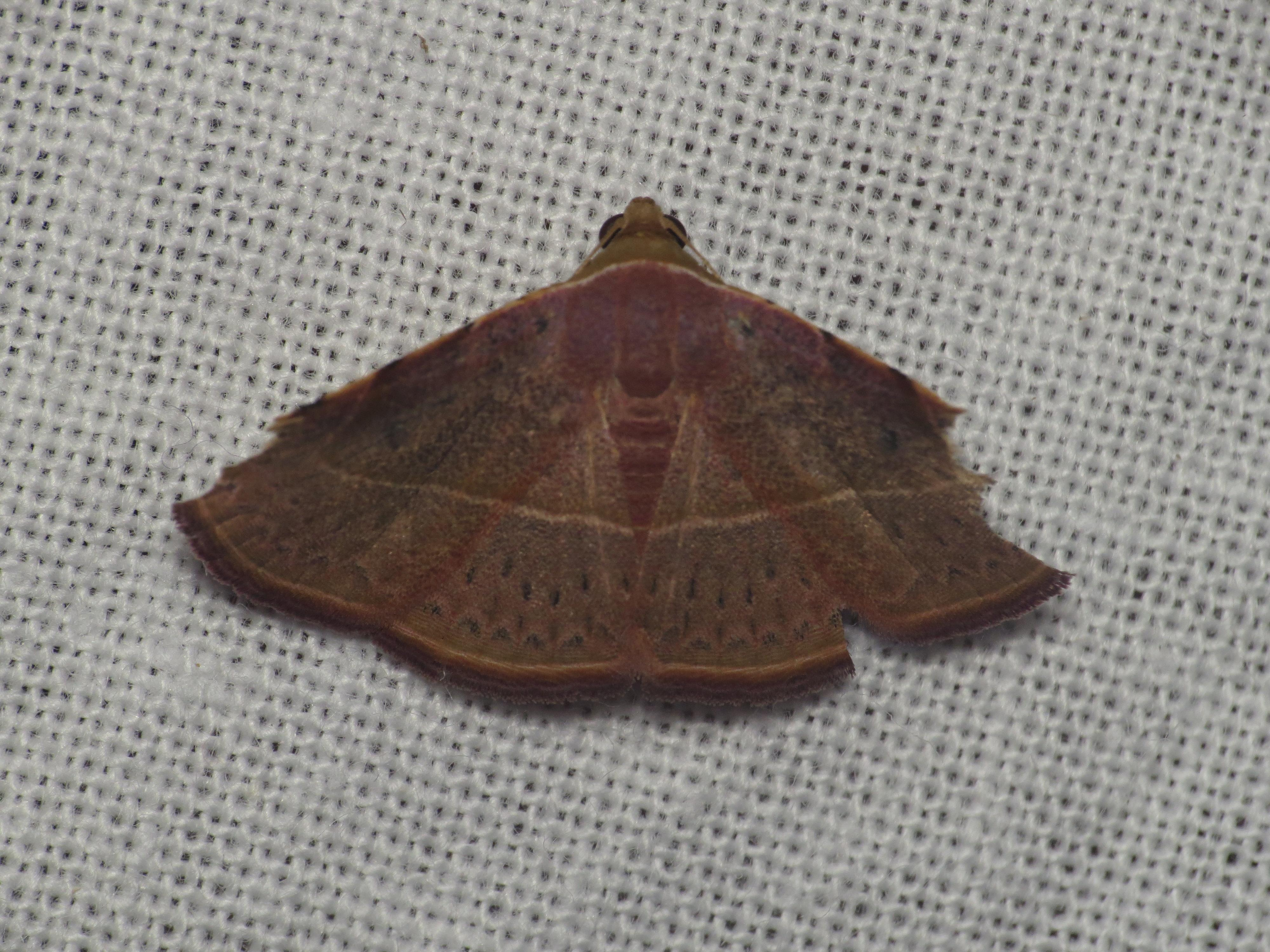
- Autoba latericolor

Scientific classification
- Domain: Eukaryota
- Kingdom: Animalia
- Phylum: Arthropoda
- Class: Insecta
- Order: Lepidoptera
- Superfamily: Noctuoidea
- Family: Erebidae
- Genus: Autoba
- Species: A. latericolor

Binomial name
- Autoba latericolor (Turner, 1945)

Synonyms
- Eublemma latericolor Turner, 1945

= Autoba latericolor =

Species of moth

Autoba latericolor is a small, reddish-grey moth found in Queensland, Australia.
