= Myllocerus angulatipes =

Scientific classification
- Kingdom: Animalia
- Phylum: Arthropoda
- Class: Insecta
- Order: Coleoptera
- Suborder: Polyphaga
- Infraorder: Cucujiformia
- Family: Curculionidae
- Genus: Myllocerus
- Species: M. angulatipes

Binomial name
- Myllocerus angulatipes Marshall, 1916

Species of beetle

Myllocerus angulatipes is a species of weevil found in India and Sri Lanka.

== Description ==
This species has a body length is about 4 to 5 mm. Body piceous, where the dorsum with brown scales, variegated with darker patches on the elytra. In the head, there is a broad lateral green stripe found below the eye. This stripe then continued along the thorax and elytra. Scutellum with dense pale green scales. The pale lateral markings are sometimes greyish or coppery. Head with fine striolation. Eyes lateral and convex. Rostrum broad in male and slightly shorter in female. Antennae testaceous brown. Scape covered with sparse minute pale scales and curved black setae. Prothorax transverse, with rounded sides. Elytra subtruncate at the base. Elytral setae short, black, scaly and recumbent. Legs testaceous.
