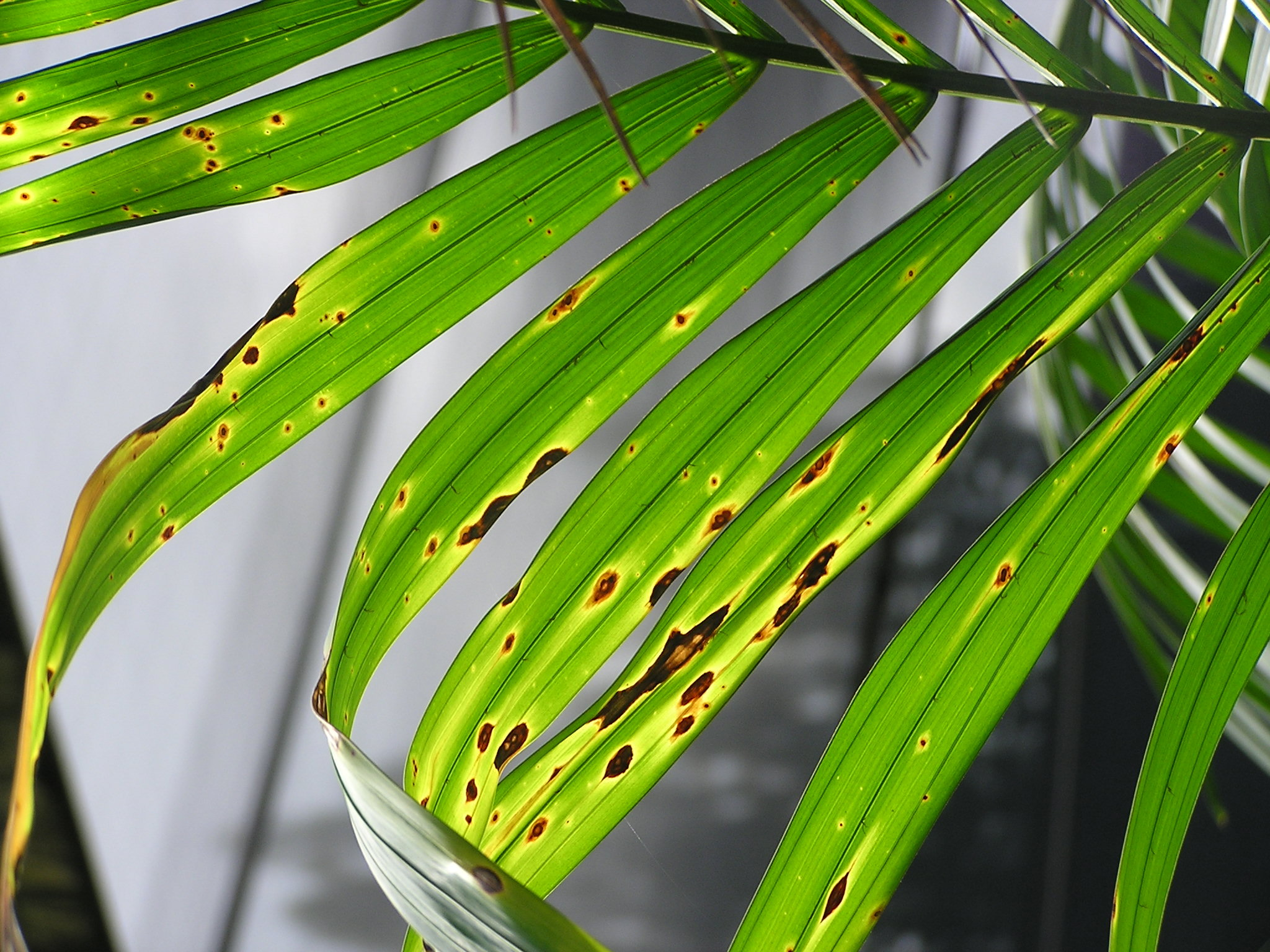
- Bipolaris leaf blight of kentia palm caused by Bipolaris incurvata

Scientific classification
- Kingdom: Fungi
- Division: Ascomycota
- Class: Dothideomycetes
- Order: Pleosporales
- Family: Pleosporaceae
- Genus: Bipolaris
- Species: B. incurvata

Binomial name
- Bipolaris incurvata (C. Bernard) Alcorn, (1983)

Synonyms
- Drechslera incurvata (C. Bernard) M.B. Ellis, (1971); Helminthosporium incurvatum C. Bernard

= Bipolaris incurvata =

Species of fungus

Bipolaris incurvata is a plant pathogen that causes blight and leaf spots in coconut trees.
