= Autoba angulifera =

Scientific classification
- Domain: Eukaryota
- Kingdom: Animalia
- Phylum: Arthropoda
- Class: Insecta
- Order: Lepidoptera
- Superfamily: Noctuoidea
- Family: Erebidae
- Genus: Autoba
- Species: A. angulifera

Binomial name
- Autoba angulifera (Moore, 1882)

Species of moth

Autoba angulifera is a species of moth of the family Erebidae first described by Frederic Moore in 1882. It is found in India.

== Biology ==
The larvae had been recorded on Mangifera sp. (Aiyar, 1943)
