= Myllocerus delicatulus =

Scientific classification
- Kingdom: Animalia
- Phylum: Arthropoda
- Class: Insecta
- Order: Coleoptera
- Suborder: Polyphaga
- Infraorder: Cucujiformia
- Family: Curculionidae
- Genus: Myllocerus
- Species: M. delicatulus

Binomial name
- Myllocerus delicatulus (Fahraeus, 1871)

Synonyms
- Phyllobius delicatulus Fahraeus, 1871; Myllocerus delicatulus Boheman, 1843; Phyllobius mimicus Walker, 1859; Myllocerus viridans Faust, 1897

Species of beetle

Myllocerus delicatulus, is a species of weevil found in India and Sri Lanka.

== Description ==
This species has a body length is about 2.5 to 3.5 mm.

It is a known pest of Litchi chinensis and Moringa oleifera.
