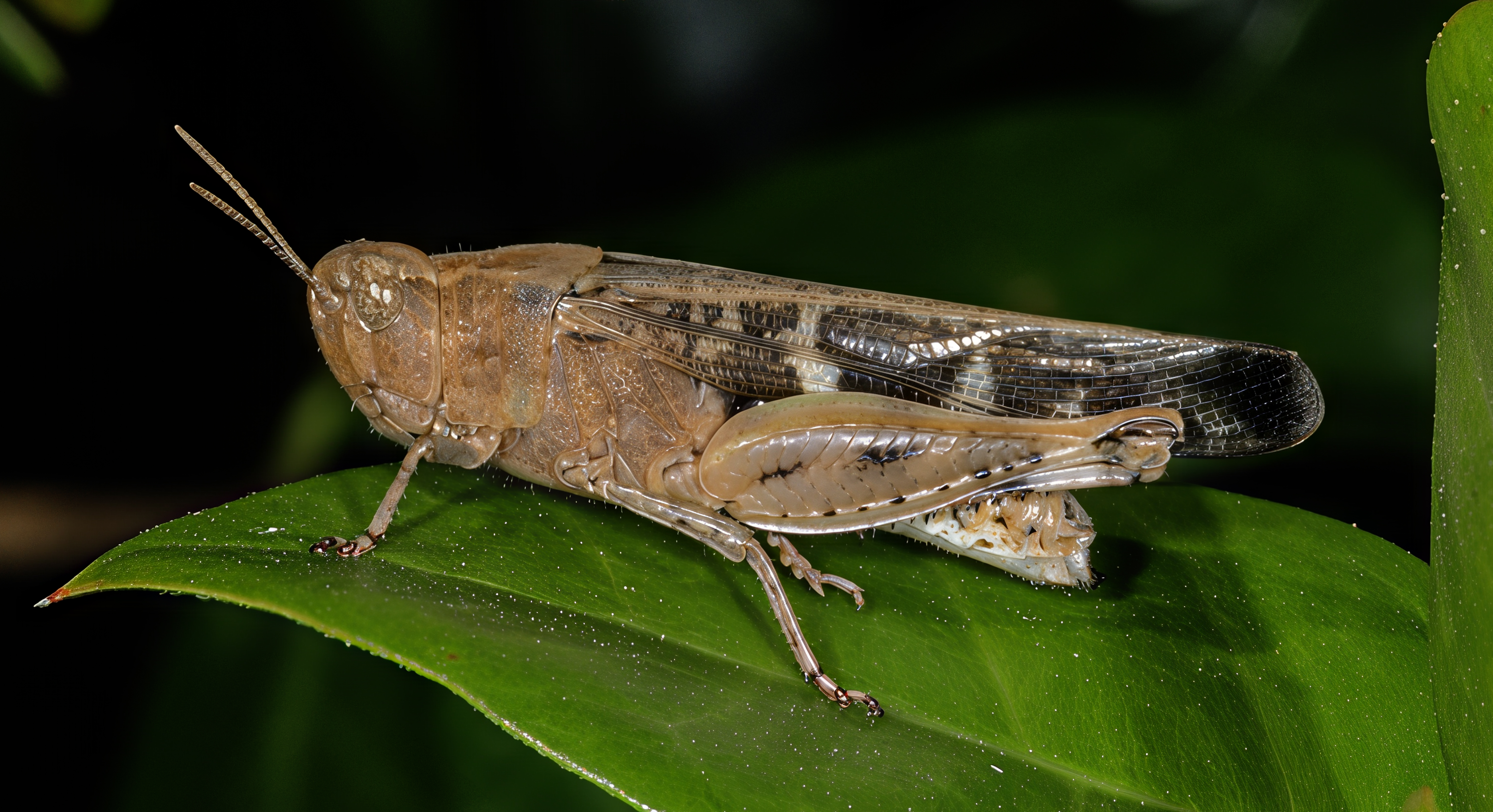
- Aiolopus strepens

Scientific classification
- Kingdom: Animalia
- Phylum: Arthropoda
- Clade: Pancrustacea
- Class: Insecta
- Order: Orthoptera
- Suborder: Caelifera
- Family: Acrididae
- Subfamily: Oedipodinae
- Tribe: Epacromiini
- Genus: Aiolopus; Fieber, 1853

= Aiolopus =

Genus of grasshoppers

Aiolopus is a genus of grasshopper belonging to the family Acrididae, subfamily Oedipodinae and tribe Epacromiini. Species can be found in Africa (including Madagascar), Europe and Asia - through to New Caledonia.

== Species ==
The Orthoptera Species File lists the following:

1. Aiolopus carinatus (Bei-Bienko, 1966)
2. Aiolopus dubia Willemse, C., 1923
3. Aiolopus longicornis Sjöstedt, 1909
4. Aiolopus luridus (Brancsik, 1895)
5. Aiolopus markamensis Yin, X., 1984
6. Aiolopus meruensis Sjöstedt, 1909
7. Aiolopus morulimarginis Zheng & Sun, 2008
8. Aiolopus nigritibis Zheng, Z. & S. Wei, 2000
9. Aiolopus obariensis Usmani, 2008
10. Aiolopus oxianus Uvarov, 1926
11. Aiolopus puissanti Defaut, 2005
12. Aiolopus simulatrix (Walker, 1870)
13. Aiolopus strepens (Latreille, 1804)
14. Aiolopus thalassinus (Fabricius, 1781) - type species (as Gryllus thalassinus Fabricius = A. thalassinus thalassinus)
