= Bipolaris glycines =

Scientific classification
- Domain: Eukaryota
- Kingdom: Fungi
- Division: Ascomycota
- Class: Dothideomycetes
- Order: Pleosporales
- Family: Pleosporaceae
- Genus: Bipolaris
- Species: B. glycines

Binomial name
- Bipolaris glycines (S. Naray. & Durairaj) B.A. Khasanov, (1971)

Synonyms
- Drechslera glycines S. Naray. & Durairaj

Species of fungus

Bipolaris glycines, or Drechslera blight, is a fungal plant pathogen of soybeans.

It was originally published as Drechslera glycini S. Naray. & Durairaj in Madras agric. J. 58 (8): 712 (1971) before being resolved in 1992 as a synonym of Bipolaris glycines.

It was found on the leaves of Glycine max (soyabean) in Tamil Nadu, India.

== See also ==
- List of soybean diseases
