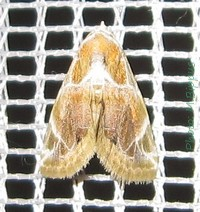
- Autoba costimacula

Scientific classification
- Kingdom: Animalia
- Phylum: Arthropoda
- Class: Insecta
- Order: Lepidoptera
- Superfamily: Noctuoidea
- Family: Erebidae
- Subfamily: Boletobiinae
- Genus: Autoba; Walker, [1863]

Synonyms
- Mestleta Walker, 1865; Eublemmoides Bethune-Baker, 1906; Smicroloba Warren, 1913

= Autoba =

Genus of moths

Autoba is a genus of moths of the family Erebidae. The genus was erected by Francis Walker in 1863.

== Taxonomy ==
The genus has previously been classified in the subfamily Eustrotiinae of the family Noctuidae.

== Species ==
- Autoba abrupta Walker, 1865
- Autoba acrapex Hampson, 1896
- Autoba admota Felder & Rogenhofer, 1874
- Autoba alabastrata Warren, 1913
- Autoba angulifera Moore, 1882
- Autoba apicimacula Mabille, 1880
- Autoba atriciliata Hampson, 1910
- Autoba beraudi de Joannis, 1909
- Autoba brachygonia Hampson, 1910
- Autoba castanea Hampson, 1910
- Autoba coccidiphaga Hampson, 1896
- Autoba costimacula Saalmüller, 1880
- Autoba crassiuscula Walker, 1864
- Autoba curvata Lucas, 1894
- Autoba dinawa Bethune-Baker, 1906
- Autoba discata Warren, 1913
- Autoba dispar Warren, 1913
- Autoba fulvipennis Warren, 1913
- Autoba galactea Hampson, 1910
- Autoba griseicosta Warren, 1913
- Autoba grisescems Warren, 1913
- Autoba indefinita Warren, 1913
- Autoba latericolor Turner, 1945
- Autoba latistriga Warren, 1913
- Autoba leucograpta Hampson, 1910
- Autoba longiplaga Warren, 1913
- Autoba loxotoma Turner, 1909
- Autoba obscura Moore, 1882
- Autoba ochracea Warren, 1913
- Autoba ochreola Hampson, 1910
- Autoba olivacea Walker, [1858]
- Autoba pallescens Warren, 1914
- Autoba pallidistriga Warren, 1913
- Autoba pectorora Lucas, 1894
- Autoba poliochroa Hampson, 1910
- Autoba pulvinariae Oliff, 1892
- Autoba quadrapex Hampson, 1891
- Autoba quadripunctata Warren, 1913
- Autoba radda Swinhoe, 1901
- Autoba reticulata Hampson, 1896
- Autoba rubiginea Hampson, 1895
- Autoba rubra Hampson, 1902
- Autoba rufiplaga Hampson, 1910
- Autoba rufipuncta Turner, 1902
- Autoba semirufa Hampson, 1902
- Autoba silicula Swinhoe, 1897
- Autoba sphragidota Turner, 1902
- Autoba subangulata Hampson, 1902
- Autoba subcinerea Snellen, 1880
- Autoba subolivalis Mabille, 1893
- Autoba teilhardi de Joannis, 1909
- Autoba trilinea de Joannis, 1909
- Autoba tristalis Leech, 1889
- Autoba undilinea Warren, 1913
- Autoba versicolor Walker, [1863]
- Autoba vestina Swinhoe, 1904
- Autoba vinotincta Hampson, 1902
