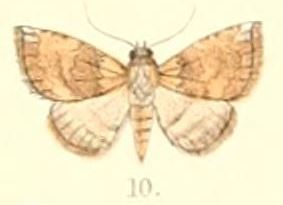

Scientific classification
- Domain: Eukaryota
- Kingdom: Animalia
- Phylum: Arthropoda
- Class: Insecta
- Order: Lepidoptera
- Superfamily: Noctuoidea
- Family: Erebidae
- Genus: Autoba
- Species: A. obscura

Binomial name
- Autoba obscura (Moore, 1882)

Synonyms
- Selenis obscura Moore, 1882

= Autoba obscura =

Species of moth

Autoba obscura is a species of moth of the family Erebidae first described by Frederic Moore in 1882. It is found in India.
