= Myllocerus discolor =

Scientific classification
- Kingdom: Animalia
- Phylum: Arthropoda
- Class: Insecta
- Order: Coleoptera
- Suborder: Polyphaga
- Infraorder: Cucujiformia
- Family: Curculionidae
- Genus: Myllocerus
- Species: M. discolor

Binomial name
- Myllocerus discolor Schoenherr, 1826

Synonyms
- Myllocerus variegatus Boheman in Schoenherr, 1843; Myllocerus persicus Zumpt, 1938

Species of beetle

Myllocerus discolor, commonly known as mango ash weevil, is a species of weevil found in India, Sri Lanka and Myanmar. The Sri Lankan population is identified as the subspecies, Myllocerus discolor canescens.

== Description ==
This small beetle is about 6 to 7 mm in length. Adult weevil is ferruginous brown in color. There is a white spot on the elytra and black mottling. It is characterized by the rostrum little broader at apex. Elytra broad with coarsely punctate striae. In pronotum, there is a central pale grey stripe and a short basal stripe laterally.

Eggs are ovoid, and light yellow in color. Grub is small, apodous and distinctly curved. Grub is pale white in color. Final grub is about 7 to 8 mm in length. Head chitinized and testaceous. Mandibles well developed and obtusely toothed. Mandibles contiguous to the labium. Thoracic segments are well developed than abdominal segments. Pupa exarate, elongate and bilaterally symmetrical. Pupa is brown in color and 6 to 7 mm in length. Pupal body wall is white which later turns to light brown.

== Biology ==
Adults are abundant during summer. During summer, adult female lays eggs in the soil. It lays about 360 eggs over a period of 24 days. Eggs hatch in 3 to 5 days. Grub period is about 1 to 2 months. Final grub starts pupation in soil inside earthen cells. Pupal period is about 7 to 10 days. Usual life cycle of the beetle is about 6 to 8 weeks. Therefore, it completes 3 to 4 generations in a year. Adult period is about 4 to 5 months in the winter.

A polyphagous pest, adult is a minor pest that attacks Cenchrus americanus, Zea mays, Saccharum officinarum and Sorghum bicolor. Grubs are known to feed on roots of teak seedlings and sunflower leaves. After the attack, root becomes hollow up to 30 to 40 mm from entry point. Injured seedlings finally died. When disturbed, adult shows a posture of "pretending dead", where the legs and antennae folded close to the body and drops to the ground. Most common control method is applying chlorinated hydrocarbons.

=== Host plants ===
- Abelmoschus esculentus
- Acacia
- Aegle marmelos
- Cenchrus americanus
- Citrus limon
- Corchorus olitorius
- Cucurbita maxima
- Dalbergia sissoo
- Eleusine coracana
- Eriobotrya japonica
- Ficus carica
- Gossypium arboreum
- Ipomoea batatas
- Litchi chinensis
- Mangifera indica
- Medicago sativa
- Moringa oleifera
- Morus alba
- Musa × paradisiaca
- Oryza sativa
- Psidium guajava
- Saccharum officinarum
- Sesbania bispinosa
- Sesbania grandiflora
- Sorghum bicolor
- Tectona grandis
- Triticum aestivum
- Vigna aconitifolia
- Zea mays
- Ziziphus mauritiana
