= Myllocerus equinus =

Scientific classification
- Kingdom: Animalia
- Phylum: Arthropoda
- Class: Insecta
- Order: Coleoptera
- Suborder: Polyphaga
- Infraorder: Cucujiformia
- Family: Curculionidae
- Genus: Myllocerus
- Species: M. equinus

Binomial name
- Myllocerus equinus Ramamurthy & Ghai, 1988

Species of beetle

Myllocerus equinus, is a species of weevil found in Sri Lanka.

== Description ==
This small beetle is about 7 mm in length.
