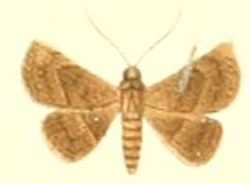

Scientific classification
- Kingdom: Animalia
- Phylum: Arthropoda
- Class: Insecta
- Order: Lepidoptera
- Superfamily: Noctuoidea
- Family: Erebidae
- Genus: Autoba
- Species: A. abrupta

Binomial name
- Autoba abrupta Walker, 1865

Synonyms
- Eublemma lurida Pagenstecher, 1900; Mestleta abrupta Walker, 1865; Thalpochares wallengreni Snellen, 1880

= Autoba abrupta =

Species of moth

Autoba abrupta is a species of moth of the family Erebidae. It is found in Papua New Guinea, Thailand, and Australia. The species is largely used by the name Eublemma abrupta in Indian and Sri Lankan texts.

== Description ==
Its wingspan is about 20 mm. The body is pale red brown and the head and collar are dark chestnut. Forewings with some dark specks found in the cell. A postmedial chestnut line can be seen, which is highly angled at vein 6 and double from there to inner margin. Two sub-marginal curved black and white specks series present. An apical pale patch, with some dark suffusion round it. Hindwings with double oblique medial line, and postmedial and submarginal series of black and white specks can be seen. Ventral side grey, suffused with reddish and irrorated with black. Forewings basal area is orange in color.

Larva reddish with black streaks, lateral dots and yellow transverse stripes. Paired oblique white stripes run across 9th and 10th somites. Somites 5, 6, 7 and 11 with dorsal prominences and somites 3,4 and 5 each with four spatulate dorsal filaments. Pupa in a small cocoon attached to a leaf.
