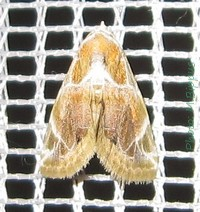
- Autoba costimacula ssp. mascarensis

Scientific classification
- Kingdom: Animalia
- Phylum: Arthropoda
- Clade: Pancrustacea
- Class: Insecta
- Order: Lepidoptera
- Superfamily: Noctuoidea
- Family: Erebidae
- Genus: Autoba
- Species: A. costimacula

Binomial name
- Autoba costimacula (Saalmüller, 1880)

Synonyms
- Thalpochares costimacula Saalmüller, 1880; Anthophila costimacula (Saalmüller, 1880); Autoba mascarensis Viette, 1975; Eublemma plagiopera Hampson, 1902

= Autoba costimacula =

Species of moth

Autoba costimacula is a species of moth of the family Erebidae first described by Max Saalmüller in 1880. It is found in southern and eastern Africa, on the islands of the Indian Ocean and in Yemen.

The wingspan of the adult moths is 14 mm.

Its larvae have been observed as predators of Coccoidea (scale insects).

== Subspecies ==
- Autoba costimacula costimacula (Saalmüller, 1880) - known from Yemen, South Africa, Uganda, Madagascar, Aldabra and Assumption Island (Seychelles).
- Autoba costimacula mascarensis Viette, 1975 - known from Réunion and Mauritius.
