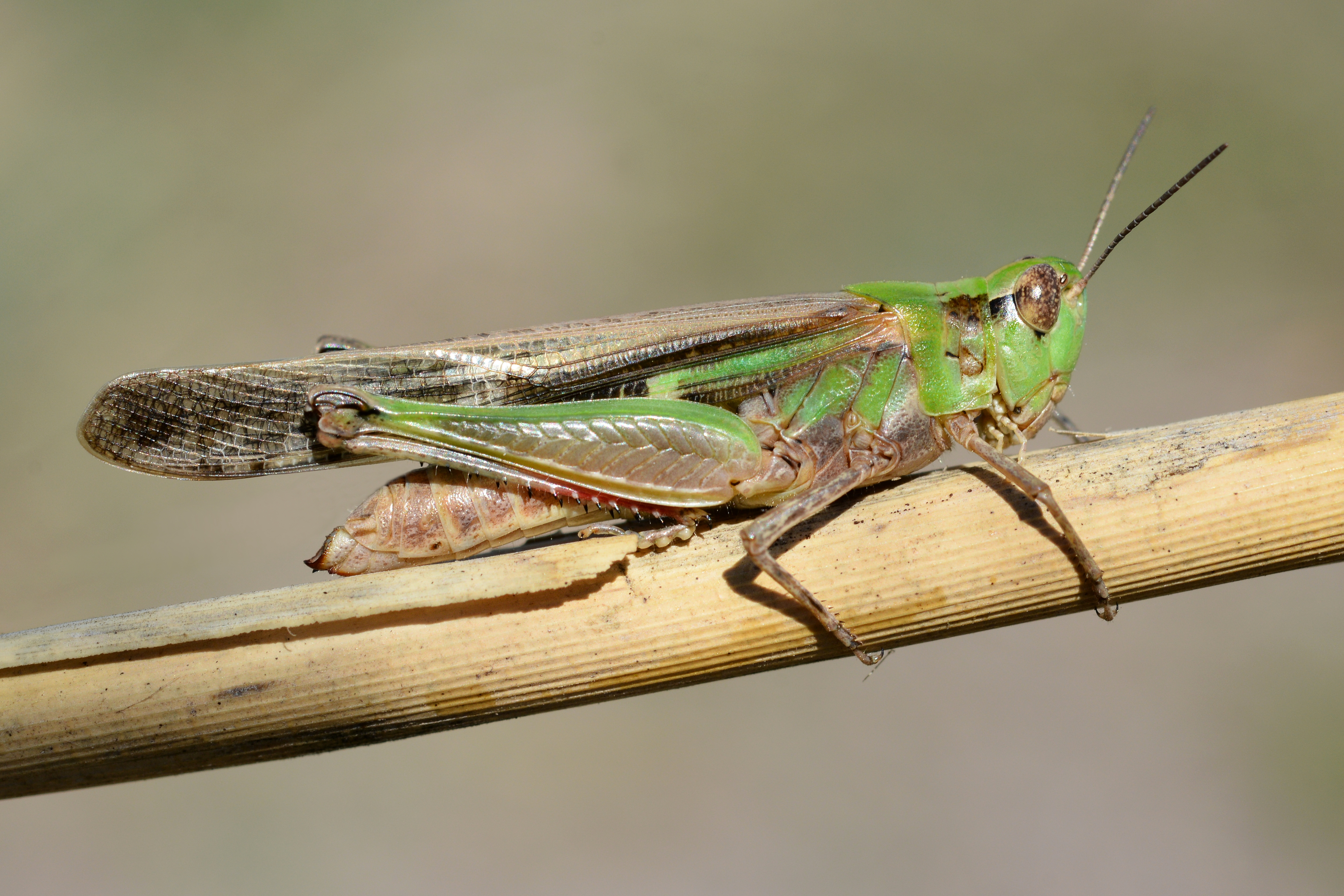
- Aiolopus puissanti, France

Conservation status
- Least Concern (IUCN 3.1)

Scientific classification
- Kingdom: Animalia
- Phylum: Arthropoda
- Clade: Pancrustacea
- Class: Insecta
- Order: Orthoptera
- Suborder: Caelifera
- Family: Acrididae
- Subfamily: Oedipodinae
- Tribe: Epacromiini
- Genus: Aiolopus
- Species: A. puissanti

Binomial name
- Aiolopus puissanti Defaut, 2005

= Aiolopus puissanti =

Species of grasshopper

Aiolopus puissanti is a species of band-winged grasshopper in the family Acrididae. It is found in southern Europe and northern Africa.
