= Myllocerus dentifer =

Scientific classification
- Kingdom: Animalia
- Phylum: Arthropoda
- Class: Insecta
- Order: Coleoptera
- Suborder: Polyphaga
- Infraorder: Cucujiformia
- Family: Curculionidae
- Genus: Myllocerus
- Species: M. dentifer

Binomial name
- Myllocerus dentifer (Fabricius, 1792)

Synonyms
- Curculio dentifer Fabricius, 1792

Species of beetle

Myllocerus dentifer, is a species of weevil found in India, Pakistan and Sri Lanka.

== Description ==
Body blackish in color with brownish spots.

== Biology ==
Adult beetles is a major pest on Ziziphus mauritiana that feed on leaves.
