= Myllocerus zeylanicus =

Scientific classification
- Kingdom: Animalia
- Phylum: Arthropoda
- Class: Insecta
- Order: Coleoptera
- Suborder: Polyphaga
- Infraorder: Cucujiformia
- Family: Curculionidae
- Genus: Myllocerus
- Species: M. zeylanicus

Binomial name
- Myllocerus zeylanicus Marshall, 1916

Species of beetle

Myllocerus zeylanicus is a species of weevil found in Sri Lanka.

== Description ==
This species has a body length of about 3.25 mm to 4.25 mm. Its body and legs are a dark orange-brown, with the body having grey or pale grey-green scales. These scales are very sparse on the dorsum, or upper back end, of the body, but much denser on the sides and ventral, or lower front end, of the body, surface. Its head is minutely striolated with large laterally located eyes. The rostrum is slightly longer than the head. Antennae are dark orange-brown with elongated clubs and conical first joints. The prothorax is broad and have slightly rounded sides. Its elytra subtruncate at the base.
