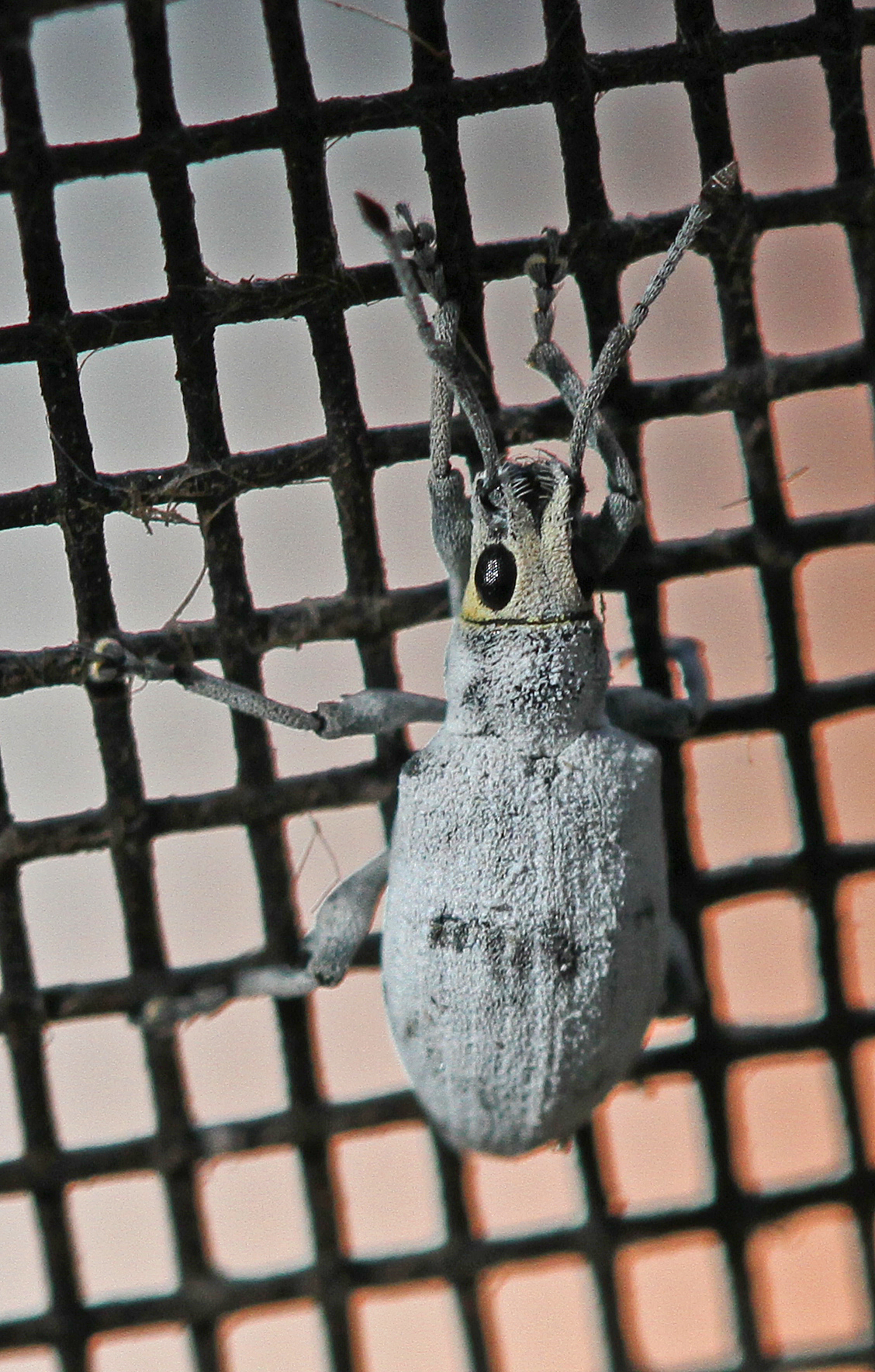

Scientific classification
- Kingdom: Animalia
- Phylum: Arthropoda
- Class: Insecta
- Order: Coleoptera
- Suborder: Polyphaga
- Infraorder: Cucujiformia
- Family: Curculionidae
- Genus: Myllocerus
- Species: M. undecimpustulatus

Binomial name
- Myllocerus undecimpustulatus Faust, J., 1891

= Myllocerus undecimpustulatus =

Species of beetle

Myllocerus undecimpustulatus, known generally as the Sri Lanka weevil or yellow-headed ravenous weevil, is a species of oriental broad-nosed weevil in the beetle family Curculionidae. It damages crops and is resistant to controls. It has spread.
