= Ramulispora sorghicola =

Scientific classification
- Kingdom: Fungi
- Division: Ascomycota
- Class: Dothideomycetes
- Order: Mycosphaerellales
- Family: Mycosphaerellaceae
- Genus: Ramulispora
- Species: R. sorghicola

Binomial name
- Ramulispora sorghicola E. Harris (1960)

Species of fungus

Ramulispora sorghicola is a plant pathogen infecting sorghum.
