= Ramulispora sorghi =

Scientific classification
- Kingdom: Fungi
- Division: Ascomycota
- Class: Dothideomycetes
- Order: Mycosphaerellales
- Family: Mycosphaerellaceae
- Genus: Ramulispora
- Species: R. sorghi

Binomial name
- Ramulispora sorghi (Ellis & Everh.) L.S. Olive & Lefebvre, (1946)

Synonyms
- Septorella sorghi Ellis & Everh., (1903)

Species of fungus

Ramulispora sorghi is a plant pathogen infecting sorghum.
