= Autoba silicula =

Scientific classification
- Domain: Eukaryota
- Kingdom: Animalia
- Phylum: Arthropoda
- Class: Insecta
- Order: Lepidoptera
- Superfamily: Noctuoidea
- Family: Erebidae
- Genus: Autoba
- Species: A. silicula

Binomial name
- Autoba silicula (Swinhoe, 1897)

Species of moth

Autoba silicula is a species of moth in the family Noctuidae. As a pest of millets, it forms a web in millet earheads and feeds on grains.
