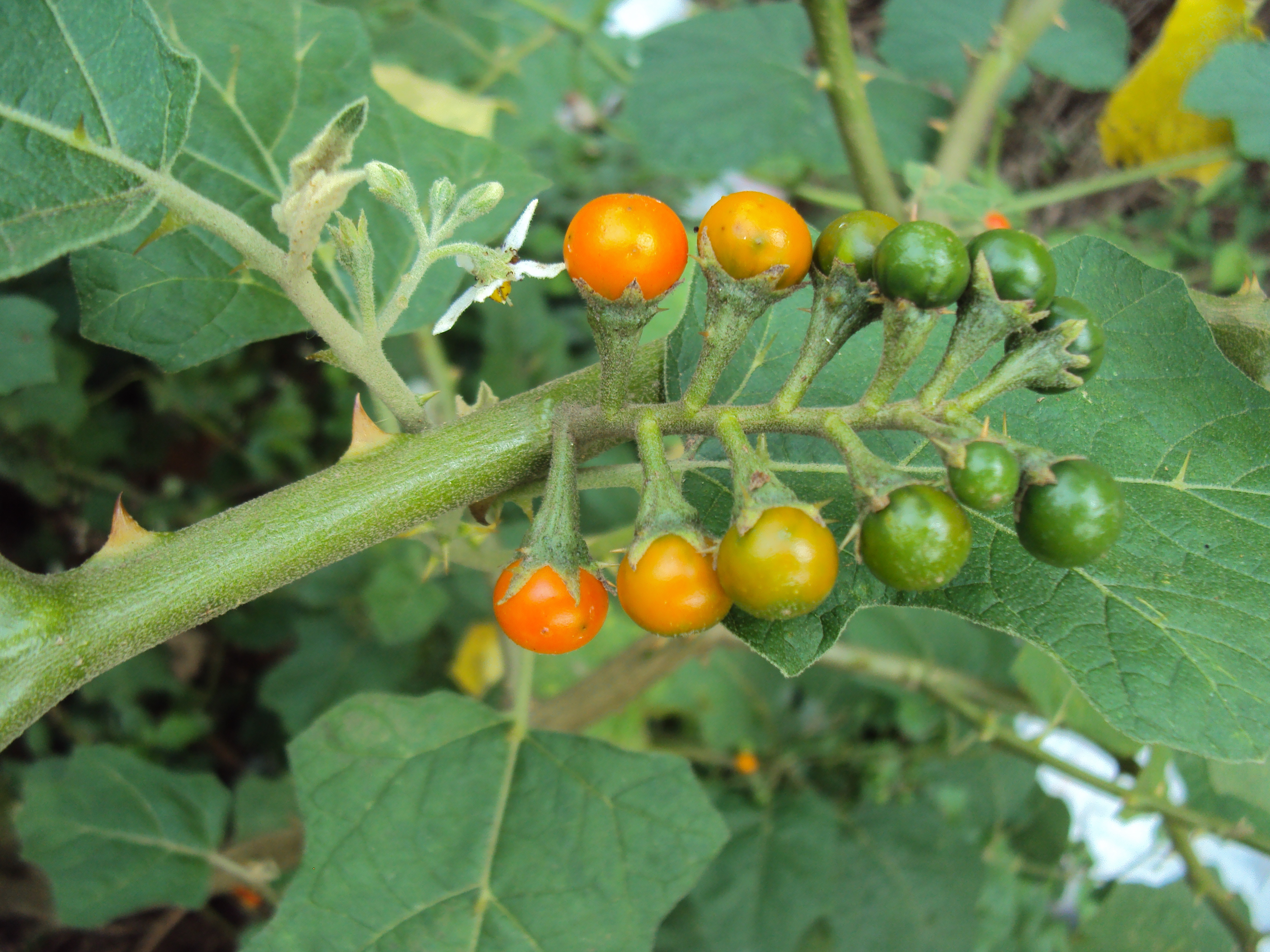

Scientific classification
- Kingdom: Plantae
- Clade: Tracheophytes
- Clade: Angiosperms
- Clade: Eudicots
- Clade: Asterids
- Order: Solanales
- Family: Solanaceae
- Genus: Solanum
- Species: S. violaceum

Binomial name
- Solanum violaceum Ortega

Synonyms
- List: Solanum agreste Roth; Solanum anguivi Hook.; Solanum chinense Dunal; Solanum coccineum Dunal; Solanum cuneatum Moench; Solanum erosum Van Heurck & Müll.Arg.; Solanum ferox Jungh. ex Miq.; Solanum heynii Roem. & Schult.; Solanum himalense Dunal Solanum indicum f. album C.Y.Wu & S.C.Huang in Fl. Yunnanica 2: 580 (1979) Solanum indicum var. erosopinnatifidum Dunal in A.P.de Candolle, Prodr. 13(1): 310 (1852) Solanum indicum var. inerme Van Heurck & Müll.Arg. in Observ. Bot. Descript. Pl. Nov. Herb. Van Heurckiani 2: 133 (1871) Solanum indicum var. mesarchon Bitter in Repert. Spec. Nov. Regni Veg. Beih. 16: 9 (1923) Solanum indicum var. parvifolium Dunal in A.P.de Candolle, Prodr. 13(1): 310 (1852) Solanum indicum var. sinuatolobatum Dunal in A.P.de Candolle, Prodr. 13(1): 309 (1852); Solanum junghuhnii Miq.; Solanum kurzii Brace ex Prain; Solanum lividum Willd. ex Dunal; Solanum nelsonii Zipp. ex Span.; Solanum nivalo-montanum C.Y.Wu & S.C.Huang; Solanum pinnatifidum Roth; Solanum pubescens Heyne ex Walp.; Solanum racemosum Noronha; Solanum sanitwongsei Craib; Solanum sodomeum Russ. ex Nees; Solanum vincentii Delile ex Dunal; Solanum virginianum Russ. ex Wall.

= Solanum violaceum =

Species of flowering plant

Solanum violaceum is a flowering plant in the family Solanaceae that is found in China at elevations of 100 to 2700 meters.

== Traditional uses ==
Solanum violaceum belongs to Solanaceae family which are extensively used as vegetables and fruits. It has also been used for variety of traditional medicinal treatment including asthma, dry cough, catarrh, colic, flatulence, worms, and fever. Different parts of the plant such as roots, fruits, seeds are used for different treatments. Roots are digestive, carminative, and astringent to the bowels, cardiac tonic, expectorant, and aphrodisiac while fruits are asthma, dry cough, catarrh, colic, flatulence, worms, and fever. Fruits are also used to relieve cough, alleviate toothache, and topically for skin disease. Seeds are mostly used to extravagance gonorrhoeic and dysuria. The indigenous Garo people of Bangladesh mix the seed with liquor to increase its intoxication effect.

The root extract of Solanum violaceum can also be used to treat obesity-related conditions.
