= Aiolopus longicornis =

Scientific classification
- Kingdom: Animalia
- Phylum: Arthropoda
- Clade: Pancrustacea
- Class: Insecta
- Order: Orthoptera
- Suborder: Caelifera
- Family: Acrididae
- Genus: Aiolopus
- Species: A. longicornis

Binomial name
- Aiolopus longicornis Sjöstedt, 1910

Species of grasshopper

Aiolopus longicornis is a species of grasshopper in the family Acrididae. It is a pest of millets such as sorghum in Africa.
