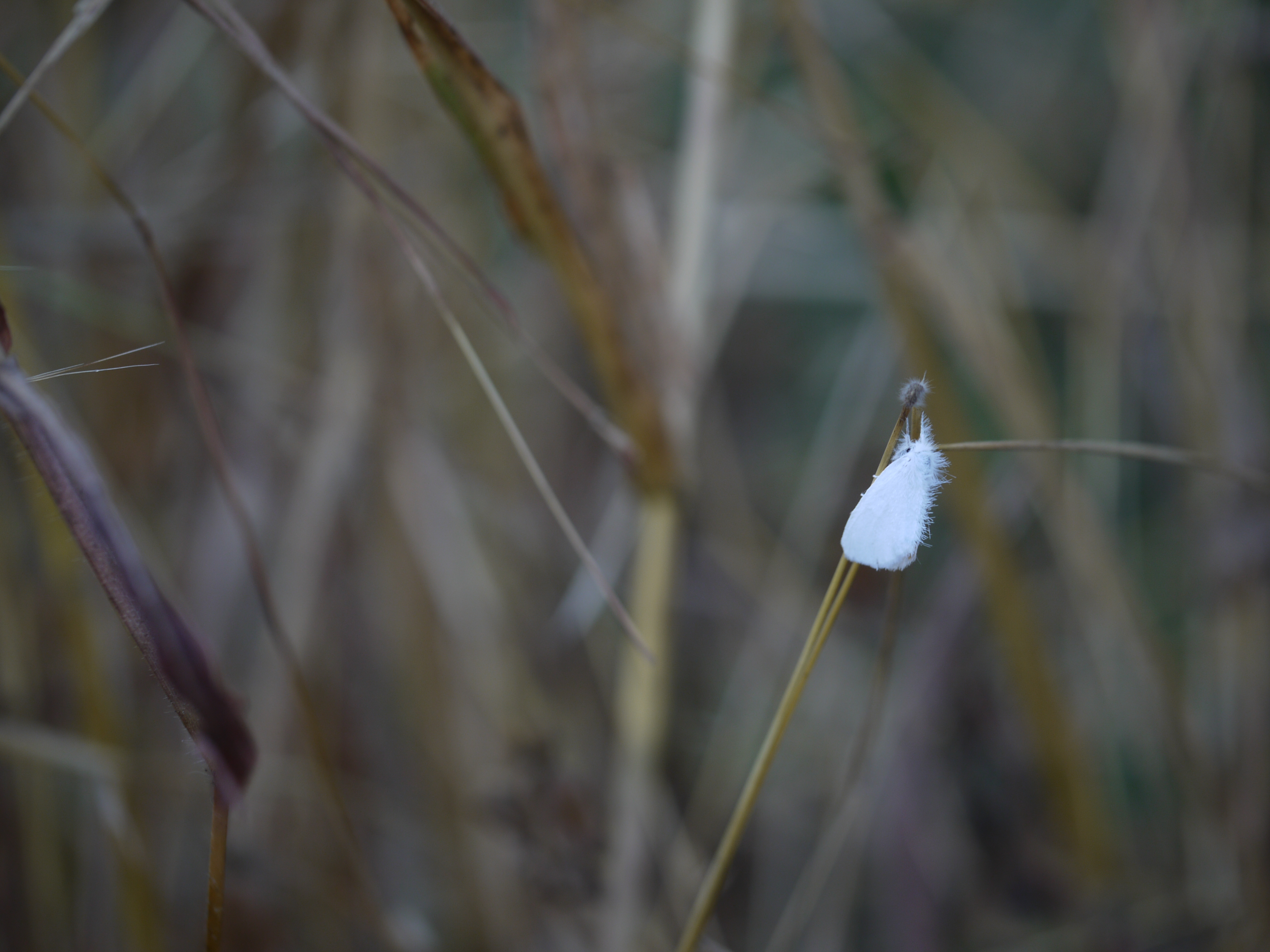

Scientific classification
- Kingdom: Animalia
- Phylum: Arthropoda
- Class: Insecta
- Order: Lepidoptera
- Superfamily: Noctuoidea
- Family: Erebidae
- Genus: Euproctis
- Species: E. virguncula

Binomial name
- Euproctis virguncula Walker, 1855

= Euproctis virguncula =

Species of moth

Euproctis virguncula is a species of moth in the family Erebidae. It is a pest of millets.
