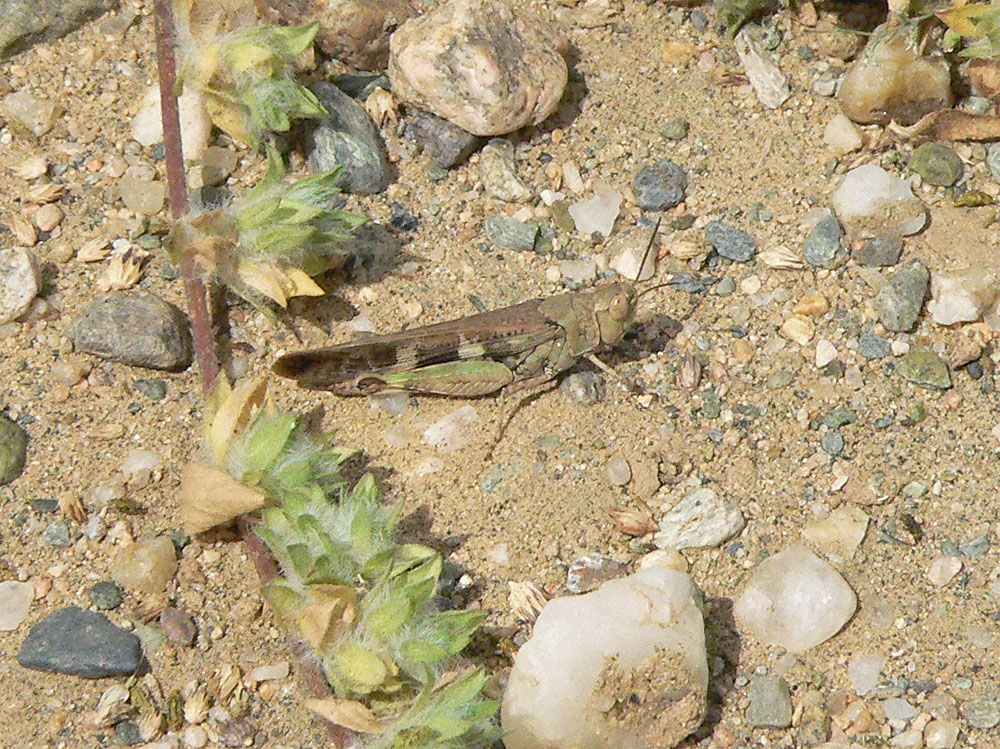
- Aiolopus simulatrix

Scientific classification
- Kingdom: Animalia
- Phylum: Arthropoda
- Clade: Pancrustacea
- Class: Insecta
- Order: Orthoptera
- Suborder: Caelifera
- Family: Acrididae
- Subfamily: Oedipodinae
- Tribe: Epacromiini
- Genus: Aiolopus
- Species: A. simulatrix

Binomial name
- Aiolopus simulatrix Walker, 1870

= Aiolopus simulatrix =

Species of grasshopper

Aiolopus simulatrix is a species of locust belonging to the family Acrididae, subfamily Oedipodinae.
