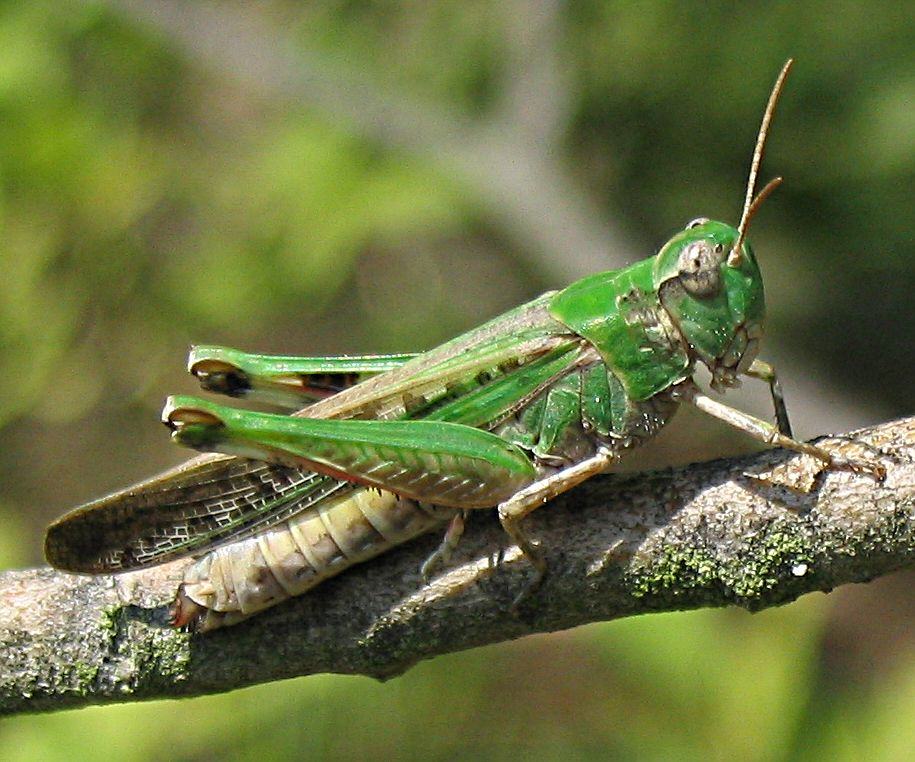

Scientific classification
- Kingdom: Animalia
- Phylum: Arthropoda
- Clade: Pancrustacea
- Class: Insecta
- Order: Orthoptera
- Suborder: Caelifera
- Family: Acrididae
- Subfamily: Oedipodinae
- Tribe: Epacromiini
- Genus: Aiolopus
- Species: A. thalassinus

Binomial name
- Aiolopus thalassinus (Fabricius, 1781)
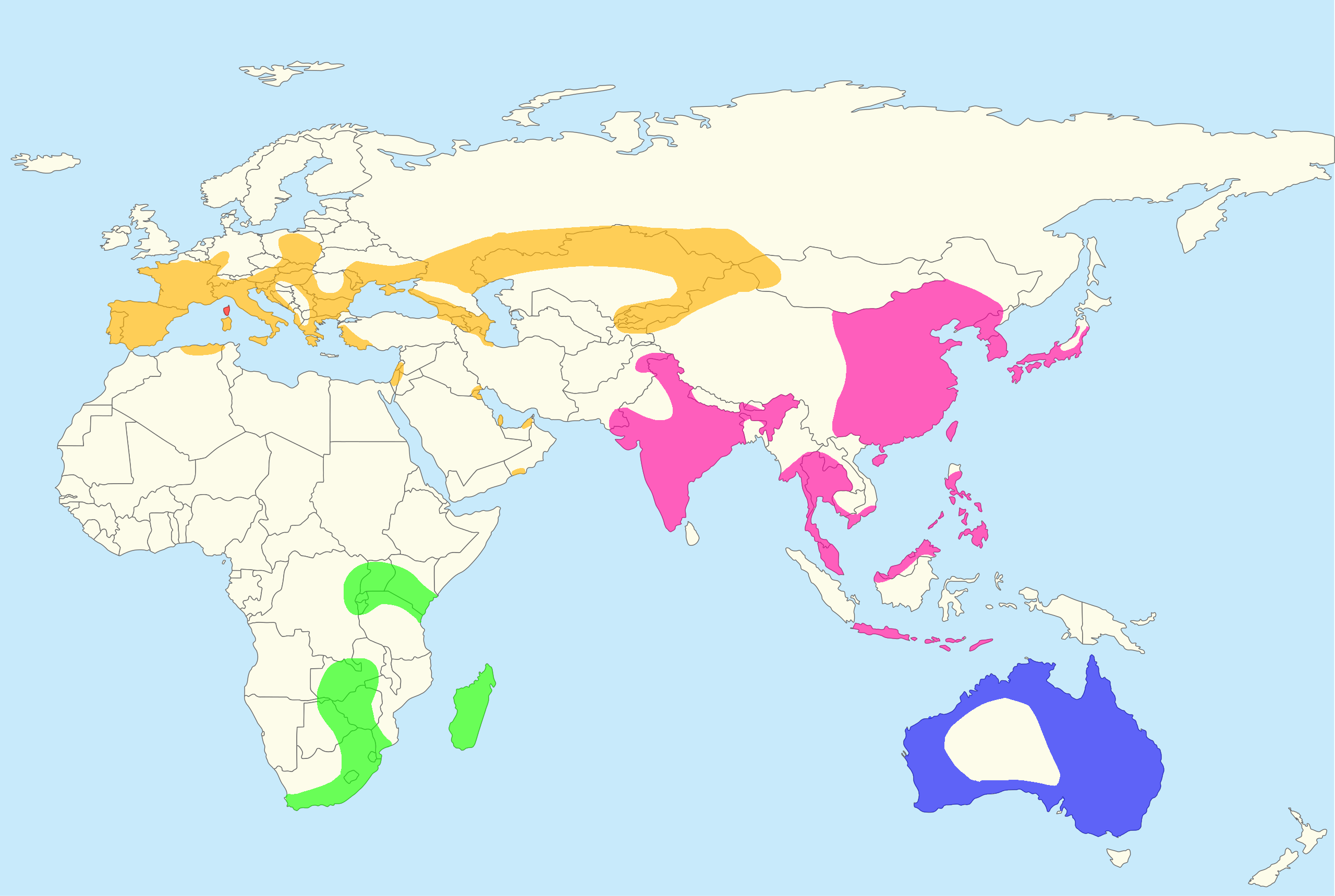
- Red - A. t. corsicus; Yellow - A. t. thalassinus; Pink - A. t. tamulus; Blue - A. t.; Green - A. t. rodericensis

Synonyms
- Aiolopus acutus Uvarov, 1953; Epacromia angustifemur Ghiliani, 1869; Gryllus flavovirens Fischer von Waldheim, 1846

= Aiolopus thalassinus =

Species of grasshopper

Aiolopus thalassinus is a species of grasshopper belonging to the family Acrididae, subfamily Oedipodinae. It is present in many countries of Europe (but not the British Isles), and in the Afrotropical realm to Asia and the Pacific islands.

The colouration of this species is generally from clear brown to dark brown. Females have a size of 21–29 mm and males of 15–19 mm.

== Subspecies ==
The Orthoptera Species File lists:

- Aiolopus thalassinus corsicus Defaut & Jaulin, 2008 (Corsica)
- Aiolopus thalassinus dubius Willemse (Pacific islands, Australia)
- Aiolopus thalassinus rodericensis (Butler, 1876) (Madagascar, La Réunion, Aldabra, Mauritius, Rodrigues, Comoros)
- Aiolopus thalassinus tamulus (Fabricius, 1798) (India, Indo-China, China, Korea, Malesia)
- Aiolopus thalassinus thalassinus (Fabricius, 1781) (Europe, Africa, central and southern Asia)

== Gallery ==
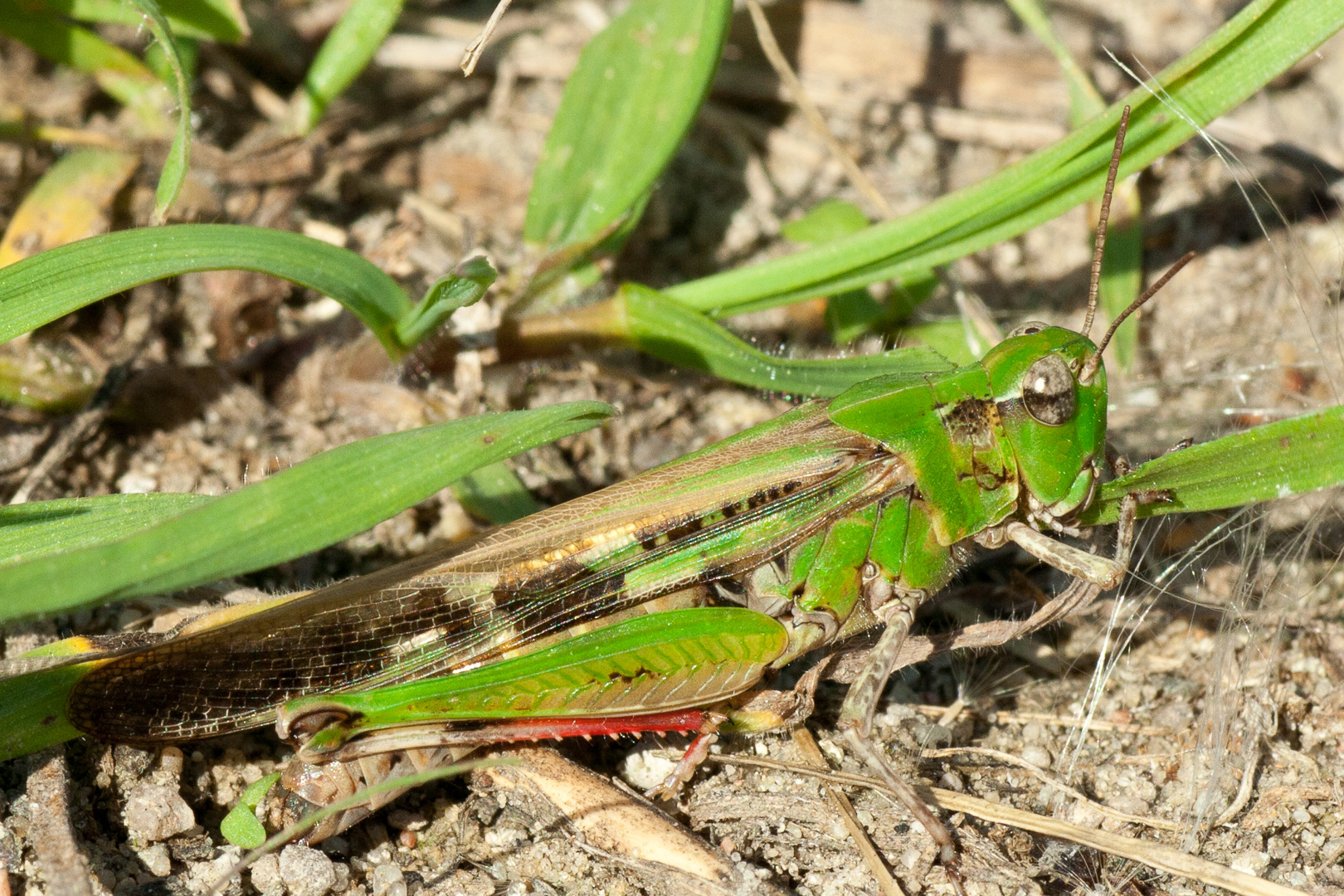
Aiolopus thalassinus feeding on grass.

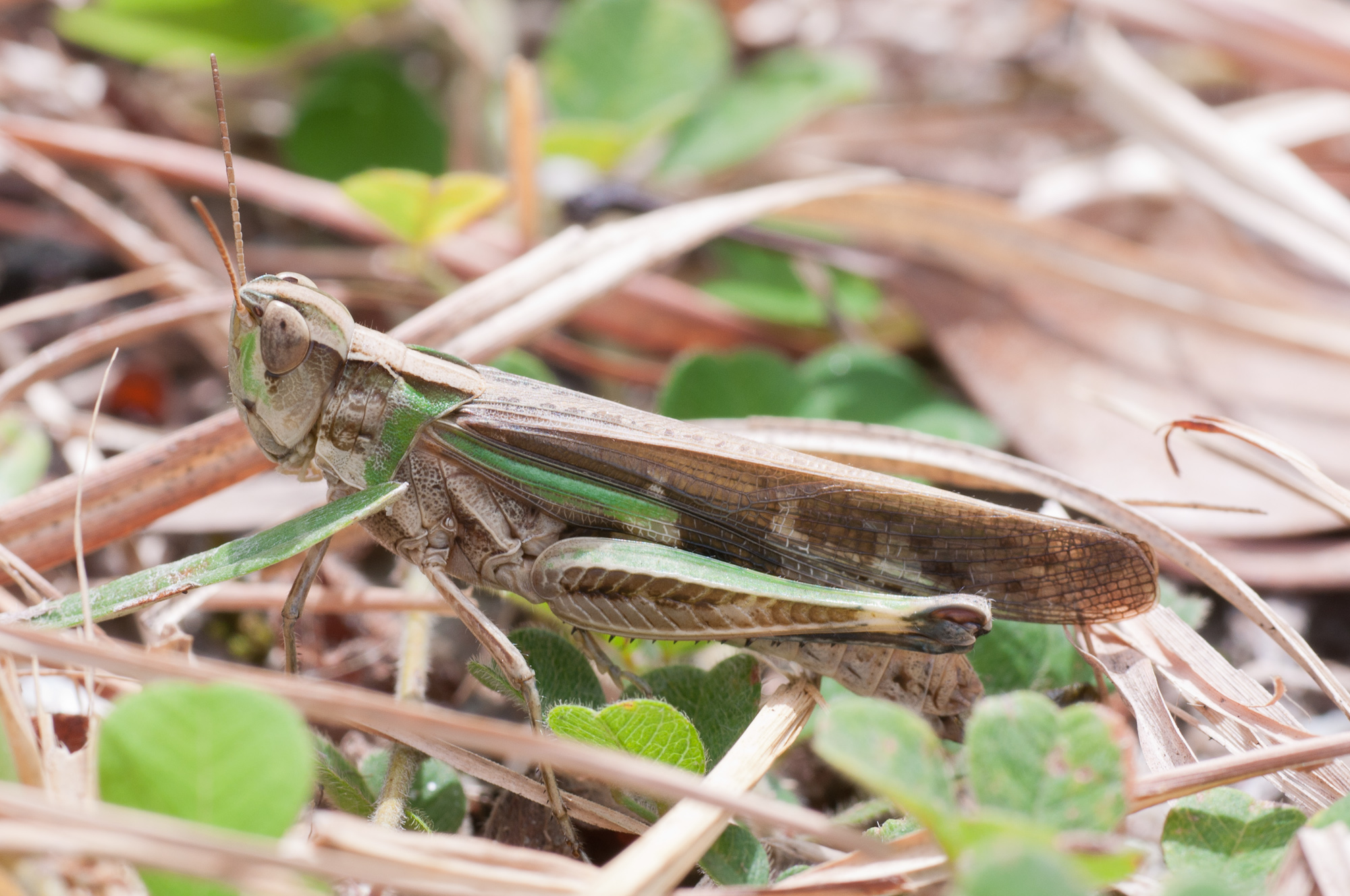

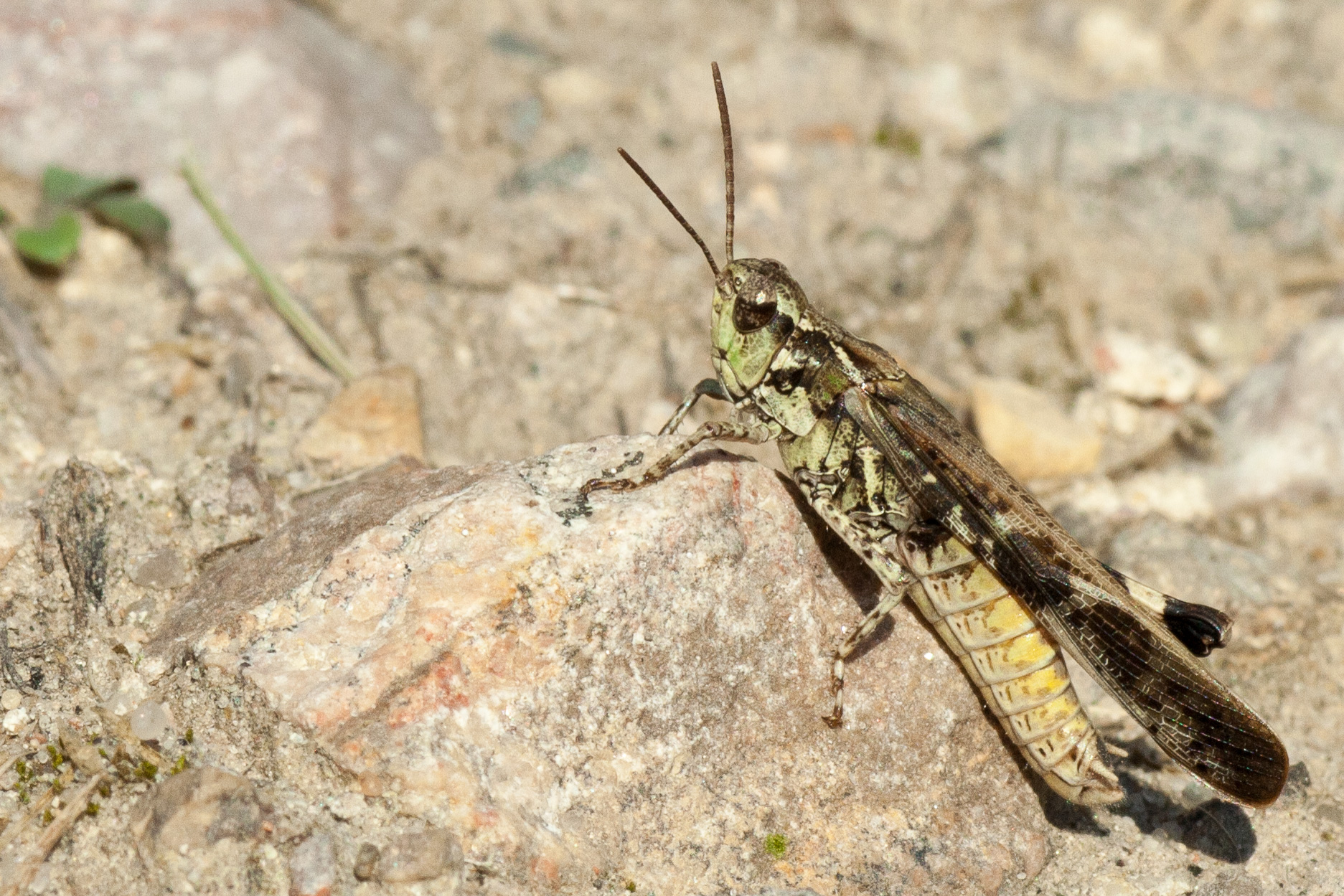
