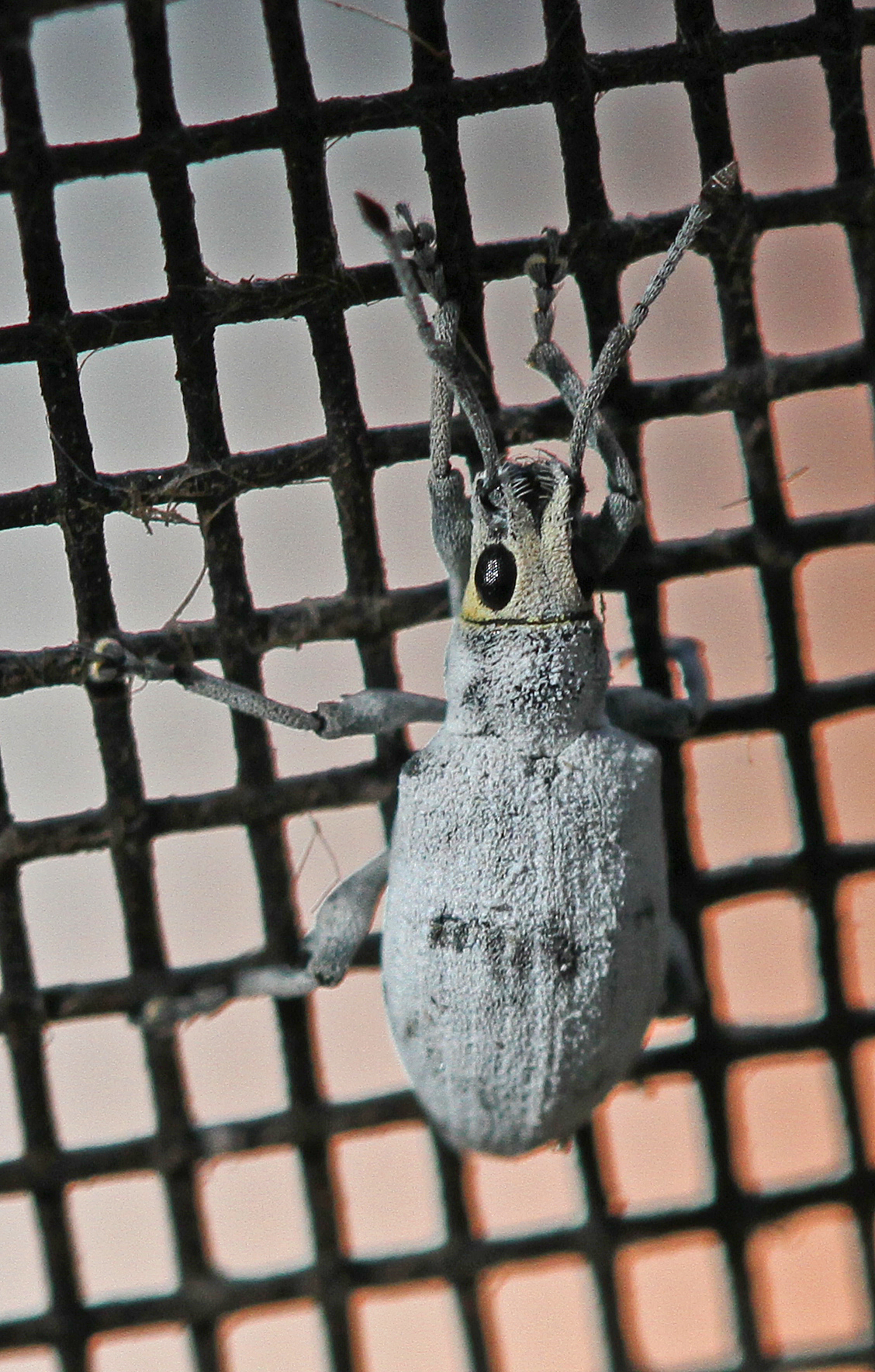
- Myllocerus undecimpustulatus

Scientific classification
- Domain: Eukaryota
- Kingdom: Animalia
- Phylum: Arthropoda
- Class: Insecta
- Order: Coleoptera
- Suborder: Polyphaga
- Infraorder: Cucujiformia
- Family: Curculionidae
- Subtribe: Myllocerina
- Genus: Myllocerus; Schönherr, 1823

= Myllocerus =

Genus of beetles

Myllocerus is a genus of oriental broad-nosed weevils in the beetle family Curculionidae. There are at least 330 described species in Myllocerus.

== See also ==
- List of Myllocerus species
