= List of alfalfa diseases =

This article is a list of diseases of alfalfa (Medicago sativa).

== Bacterial diseases ==
Bacterial diseases
Bacterial leaf spot	Xanthomonas campestris pv. alfalfae
Bacterial sprout rot	Erwinia chrysanthemi pv. chrysanthemi
Bacterial stem blight	Pseudomonas savastanoi pv. phaseolicola = P. medicaginis
Bacterial wilt	Clavibacter michiganensis subsp. insidiosus = Corynebacterium insidiosum
Crown gall	Agrobacterium tumefaciens
Crown and root rot complex	Pseudomonas viridiflava
Dwarf	Xylella fastidiosa

== Fungal diseases ==
Fungal diseases
Acrocalymma root and crown rot	Acrocalymma medicaginis Massarina walkeri [teleomorph]
Anthracnose	Colletotrichum trifolii
Aphanomyces root rot	Aphanomyces euteiches
Black patch	Rhizoctonia leguminicola
Black root rot	Thielaviopsis basicola Chalara elegans [synanamorph]
Blossom blight	Botrytis cinerea Botryotinia fuckeliana [teleomorph] Sclerotinia sclerotiorum
Brown root rot	Phoma sclerotioides = Plenodomus meliloti
Crown and root rot complex	Fusarium acuminatum Gibberella acuminata [teleomorph] Fusarium avenaceum Gibberella avenacea [teleomorph] Fusarium equiseti Fusarium oxysporum Fusarium sambucinum Fusarium solani Nectria haematococca [teleomorph] Fusarium spp. Phoma medicaginis Pythium spp. Rhizoctonia solani Thanatephorus cucumeris [teleomorph] Thielaviopsis basicola Chalara elegans [synanamorph]
Charcoal rot	Macrophomina phaseolina
Common leaf spot	Pseudopeziza medicaginis
Corky root rot	Xylaria sp.
Crown wart	Physoderma alfalfae = Urophlyctis alfalfae
Cylindrocarpon root rot	Cylindrocarpon magnusianum = Cylindrocarpon ehrenbergii Nectria ramulariae [teleomorph]
Cylindrocladium root and crown rot	Cylindrocladium crotalariae Calonectria crotalariae [teleomorph]
Damping-off	Fusarium acuminatum Gibberella acuminata [teleomorph] Mycoleptodiscus terrestris Phytophthora medicaginis Phytophthora megasperma f.sp. medicaginis Pythium spp. Pythium debaryanum Pythium irregulare Pythium splendens Pythium ultimum Rhizoctonia solani Thanatephorus cucumeris [teleomorph]
Downy mildew	Peronospora trifoliorum
Fusarium wilt	Fusarium oxysporum f.sp. medicaginis
Lepto leaf spot	Leptosphaerulina trifolii
Marasmius root rot	Marasmius sp.
Mycoleptodiscus crown and root rot	Mycoleptodiscus terrestris
Myrothecium root rot	Myrothecium roridum Myrothecium verrucaria
Phymatotrichum root rot = cotton root rot = Texas root rot	Phymatotrichopsis omnivora = Phymatotrichum omnivorum
Phytophthora root rot	Phytophthora medicaginis Phytophthora megasperma f.sp. medicaginis
Powdery mildew	Erysiphe medicaginis Leveillula papilionacearum
Rhizoctonia root rot and stem blight	Rhizoctonia solani Thanatephorus cucumeris [teleomorph]
Rhizopus sprout rot	Rhizopus stolonifer
Rust	Uromyces striatus = Uromyces medicaginis = Uromyces oblongus = Uromyces striatus var. medicaginis
Sclerotinia crown and stem rot	Sclerotinia trifoliorum Sclerotinia sclerotiorum
Southern blight	Sclerotium rolfsii Athelia rolfsii [teleomorph]
Spring black stem and leaf spot	Phoma medicaginis
Stagonospora leaf spot and root rot	Stagonospora meliloti Phoma meliloti [synanamorph] Leptosphaeria pratensis [teleomorph]
Stemphylium leaf spot	Pleospora spp. Stemphylium alfalfae Pleospora alfalfae[teleomorph] Stemphylium botryosum Pleospora tarda [teleomorph] Stemphylium globuliferum Stemphylium herbarum Pleospora herbarum [teleomorph] Stemphylium vesicarium species complex
Summer black stem and leaf spot	Cercospora medicaginis
Verticillium wilt	Verticillium albo-atrum Verticillium dahliae
Violet root rot	Helicobasidium brebissonii Rhizoctonia crocorum[anamorph]
Winter crown rot = Coprinus snow mold	Coprinus psychromorbidus
Yellow leaf blotch	Leptotrochila medicaginis = Pyrenopeziza medicaginis = Pseudopeziza jonesii Sporonema phacidioides [anamorph]

== Nematodes, parasitic ==
Nematodes, parasitic
Bulb and stem nematode	Ditylenchus dipsaci
Chrysanthemum foliar nematode	Aphelenchoides ritzemabosi
Cyst nematode	Heterodera trifolii
Dagger nematode	Xiphinema americanum
Lesion nematode	Pratylenchus spp. Pratylenchus neglectus Pratylenchus penetrans
Needle nematode	Longidorus spp.
Pin nematode	Paratylenchus spp. Paratylenchus hamatus
Reniform nematode	Rotylenchulus spp.
Root-knot nematode	Meloidogyne spp. Meloidogyne arenaria Meloidogyne chitwoodi Meloidogyne hapla Meloidogyne incognita Meloidogyne javanica
Spiral nematode	Helicotylenchus spp.
Stubby-root nematode	Paratrichodorus spp.
Stunt nematode	Tylenchorhynchus spp.

== Viral diseases ==
Viral diseases
Alfalfa enation	genus Rhabdovirus, Alfalfa enation virus (AEV)
Alfalfa mosaic	genus Alfamovirus, Alfalfa mosaic virus (AMV)
Bean leaf roll	genus Luteovirus, Bean leaf roll virus (BLRV)
Bean yellow mosaic	genus Potyvirus, Bean yellow mosaic virus (BYMV)
Cucumber mosaic	genus Cucumovirus, Cucumber mosaic virus (CMV)
Lucerne Australian latent	genus Nepovirus, Lucerne Australian latent virus (LALV)
Lucerne Australian symptomless	genus Comoviridae, Lucerne Australian symptomless virus (LASV)
Lucerne transient streak	genus Sobemovirus, Lucerne transient streak virus (LTSV)
Pea streak	genus Carlavirus, Pea streak virus (PSV)
Red clover vein mosaic	genus Carlavirus, Red clover vein mosaic virus (RCVMV)
Tobacco streak	genus Ilarvirus, Tobacco streak virus (TSV)
White clover mosaic	genus Potexvirus, White clover mosaic virus (WCMV)

== Phytoplasmal and spiroplasmal diseases ==
Phytoplasmal and spiroplasmal diseases
Aster yellows	Aster yellows phytoplasma
Witches'-broom	Phytoplasma

== See also ==
- Alfalfa pests, pests named for alfalfa
