= List of red clover diseases =

This article is a list of diseases of red clover (Trifolium pratense).

== Bacterial diseases ==
Bacterial diseases
Bacterial leaf spot	Pseudomonas syringae

== Fungal diseases ==
Fungal diseases
Anther mold	Botrytis anthophila Sclerotinia spermophila [teleomorph]
Black patch	Rhizoctonia leguminicola
Black root rot	Thielaviopsis basicola Chalara elegans [synanamorph]
Common leaf spot	Pseudopeziza trifolii
Curvularia leaf blight	Curvularia trifolii
Cylindrocarpon root rot	Cylindrocarpon magnusianum = Cylindrocarpon ehrenbergii Nectria ramulariae [teleomorph]
Downy mildew	Peronospora trifoliorum
Fusarium root rot	Fusarium oxysporum Fusarium solani Nectria haematococca [teleomorph] Fusarium spp.
Leaf gall	Physoderma trifolii = Urophlyctis trifolii
Mid-vein spot	Mycosphaerella carinthiaca
Mycoleptodiscus crown and root rot	Mycoleptodiscus terrestris = Leptodiscus terrestris
Northern anthracnose	Aureobasidium caulivorum = Kabatiella caulivora
Powdery mildew	Erysiphe polygoni
Rust	Uromyces trifolii-repentis var. fallens
Sclerotinia crown and root rot	Sclerotinia trifoliorum
Seed mold	Alternaria alternata
Seed rot and damping-off	Pythium debaryanum
Sooty blotch	Cymadothea trifolii Polythrincium trifolii [anamorph]
Southern anthracnose	Colletotrichum trifolii
Southern blight	Sclerotium rolfsii Athelia rolfsii [teleomorph]
Spring black stem and leaf spot	Phoma pinodella = Phoma trifolii
Stagonospora leaf spot and root rot	Stagonospora recedens
Summer black stem	Cercospora zebrina
Target spot (ring spot)	Stemphylium sarciniforme Stemphylium botryosum Pleospora tarda [teleomorph]
Violet root rot	Helicobasidium brebissonii Rhizoctonia crocorum [anamorph]
Winter rot	Coprinus psychromorbidus Phoma sclerotioides = Plenodomus meliloti Typhula spp.

== Nematodes, parasitic ==
Nematodes, parasitic
Bulb and stem	Ditylenchus dipsaci
Cyst	Heterodera trifolii
Dagger	Xiphinema americanum
Lance	Hoplolaimus spp.
Lesion	Pratylenchus spp. Pratylenchus penetrans
Pin	Paratylenchus spp.
Ring	Criconemella spp.
Root-knot	Meloidogyne spp. Meloidogyne arenaria Meloidogyne hapla Meloidogyne incognita Meloidogyne javanica
Spiral	Helicotylenchus spp.

== Viral diseases ==
Viral diseases
Dwarf	Soybean dwarf virus
Mosaic disease	Alfalfa mosaic virus (AMV)
Alsike clover mosaic virus	Bean yellow mosaic virus
Clover mild mosaic virus	Clover yellow mosaic virus
Common pea mosaic virus	Cowpea mosaic virus
Croatian clover mosaic potyvirus	Cucumber mosaic virus
White clover mosaic virus	Red clover virus Red clover virus 1 & 2
Red clover vein mosaic	Red clover vein mosaic virus (RCVMV)
Ring spot	Tobacco ringspot virus Tomato ringspot virus
Streak	Tobacco streak virus Wisconsin pea streak virus
Wilt	Broadbean wilt virus
Witches' broom	Witches' broom virus
Yellow dwarf	Potato yellow dwarf virus
