= Legume =

Plants in the family Fabaceae

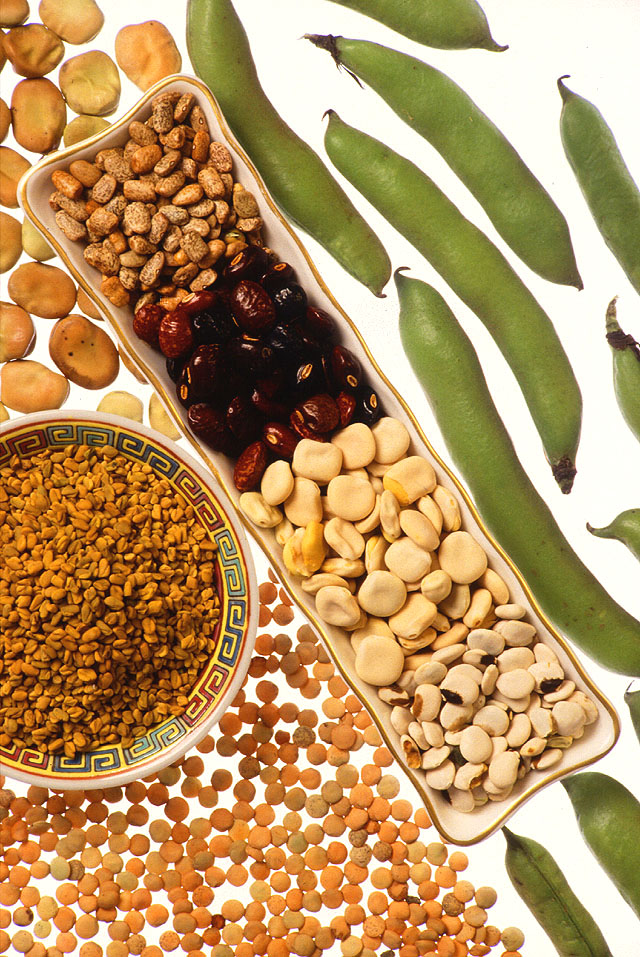
A selection of dried pulses and fresh legumes

Legumes are plants in the pea family Fabaceae (or Leguminosae), or the fruit or seeds of such plants. When used as a dry grain for human consumption, the seeds are also called pulses. Legumes are grown agriculturally, primarily for human consumption, but also as livestock forage and silage, and as soil-enhancing green manure. Legumes produce a botanically unique type of fruit—a simple dry fruit that develops from a simple carpel and usually dehisces (opens along a seam) on two sides.

Most legumes have symbiotic nitrogen-fixing bacteria, Rhizobia, in structures called root nodules. Some of the fixed nitrogen becomes available to later crops, so legumes play a key role in crop rotation.

== Terminology ==
The term pulse, as used by the United Nations' Food and Agriculture Organization (FAO), is reserved for legume crops harvested solely for the dry seed. This excludes green beans and green peas, which are considered vegetable crops. Also excluded are seeds that are mainly grown for oil extraction (oilseeds like soybeans and peanuts), and seeds which are used exclusively for sowing forage (clovers, alfalfa). However, in common usage, these distinctions are not always clearly made, and many of the varieties used for dried pulses are also used for green vegetables, with their beans in pods while young.

The Food and Agriculture Organization (FAO) recognizes 11 primary pulses, excluding green vegetable legumes (such as green peas) and legumes used mainly for oil extraction (for example, soybeans and groundnuts) or used only as seed (such as clover and alfalfa).

1. Dry beans (Note: FAOSTAT code 0176, Phaseolus spp. including several species now in Vigna.)
  - Kidney bean, navy bean, pinto bean, black turtle bean, haricot bean (Phaseolus vulgaris)
  - Lima bean, butter bean (Phaseolus lunatus)
  - Adzuki bean, azuki bean (Vigna angularis)
  - Mung bean, golden gram, green gram (Vigna radiata)
  - Black gram, urad (Vigna mungo)
  - Scarlet runner bean (Phaseolus coccineus)
  - Ricebean (Vigna umbellata)
  - Moth bean (Vigna aconitifolia)
  - Tepary bean (Phaseolus acutifolius)
2. Dry broad beans (Note: FAOSTAT code 0181, Vicia faba)
  - Horse bean (Vicia faba equina)
  - Broad bean (Vicia faba)
  - Field bean (Vicia faba)
3. Dry peas (Note: FAOSTAT code 0187, Pisum spp.)
  - Garden pea (Pisum sativum var. sativum)
  - Protein pea (Pisum sativum var. arvense)
4. Chickpea (also known as garbanzo and Bengal gram) (Note: FAOSTAT code 0191, Cicer arietinum)
5. Dry cowpea, black-eyed pea, blackeye bean (Note: FAOSTAT code 0195, Vigna unguiculata)
6. Pigeon pea (aka Arhar/Toor, cajan pea, Congo bean, gandules) (Note: FAOSTAT code 0197, Cajanus cajan)
7. Lentil (Note: FAOSTAT code 0201, Lens culinaris)
8. Bambara groundnut (aka earth pea) (Note: FAOSTAT code 0203, Vigna subterranea)
9. Vetch, common vetch (Note: FAOSTAT code 0205, Vicia sativa)
10. Lupins (Note: FAOSTAT code 0210, Lupinus spp.)
11. Pulses NES (Note: FAOSTAT code 0211, Minor pulses) including:
  - Lablab, hyacinth bean (Lablab purpureus)
  - Jack bean (Canavalia ensiformis), sword bean (Canavalia gladiata)
  - Winged bean (Psophocarpus tetragonolobus)
  - Velvet bean, cowitch (Mucuna pruriens var. utilis)
  - Yam bean (Pachyrhizus erosus)

== Distribution ==
Legumes are widely distributed as the third-largest land plant family in terms of number of species, behind only the Orchidaceae and Asteraceae, with about 751 genera and some 19,000 known species, constituting about seven percent of flowering plant species.

== Ecology ==
=== Nitrogen fixation ===
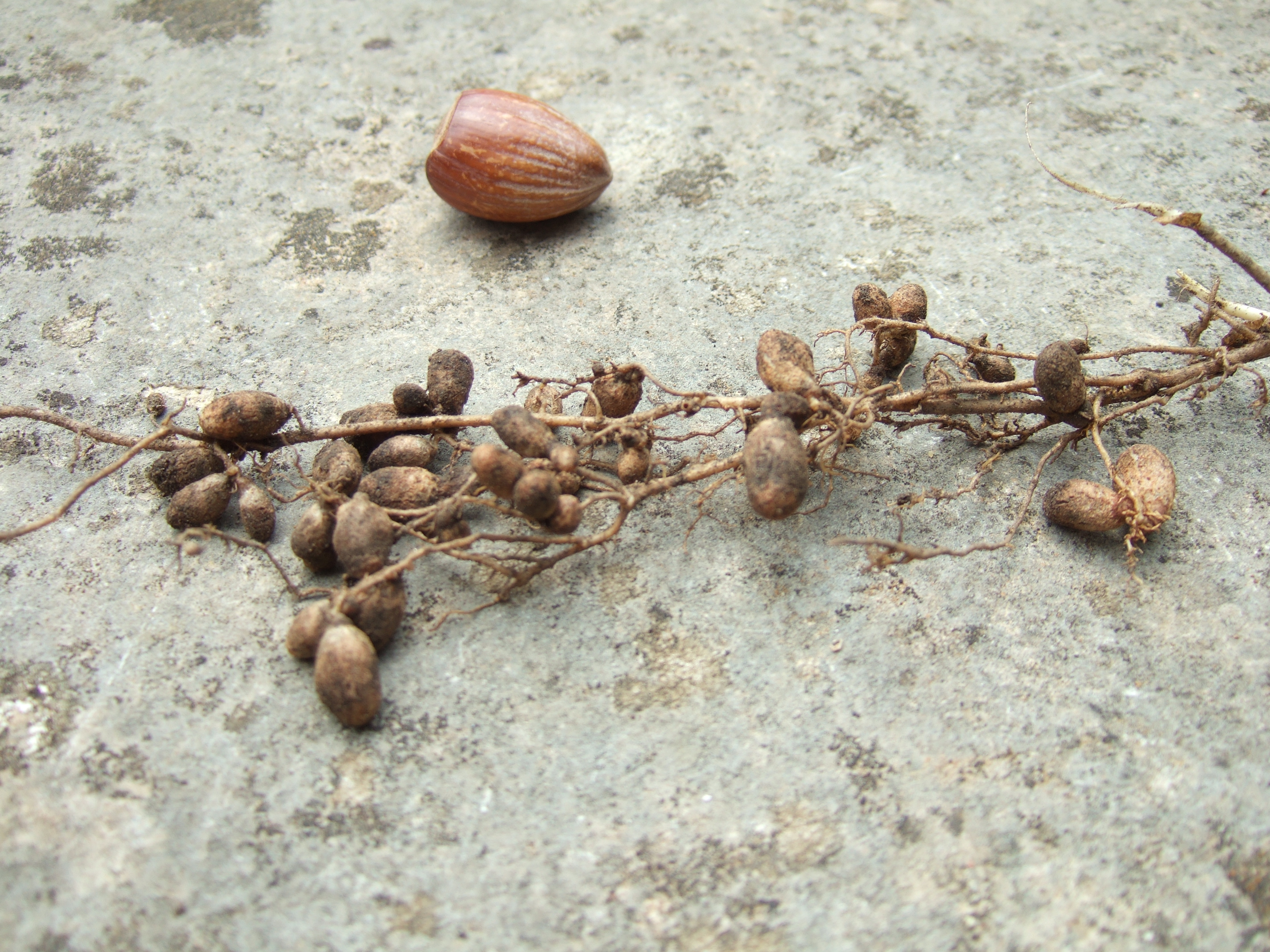
Root nodules on a Wisteria plant (a hazelnut pictured for comparison)

Many legumes contain symbiotic bacteria called Rhizobia within root nodules of their root systems (plants belonging to the genus Styphnolobium are one exception to this rule). These bacteria have the special ability of fixing nitrogen from atmospheric, molecular nitrogen (N_{2}) into ammonia (NH_{3}). The chemical reaction is:

N_{2} + 8 H^{+} + 8 e^{−} → 2 NH_{3} + H_{2}

Ammonia is converted to another form, ammonium (NH^{+}_{4}), usable by (some) plants, by the following reaction:

NH_{3} + H^{+} → NH^{+}_{4}

This arrangement means that the root nodules are sources of nitrogen for legumes, making them relatively rich in nitrogenous amino acids and protein. Nitrogen is therefore a necessary ingredient in the production of proteins.

When a legume plant dies in the field, for example following the harvest, all of its remaining nitrogen, incorporated into amino acids inside the remaining plant parts, is released back into the soil. In the soil, the amino acids are converted to nitrate (NO^{−}_{3}), making the nitrogen available to other plants, thereby serving as fertilizer for future crops.

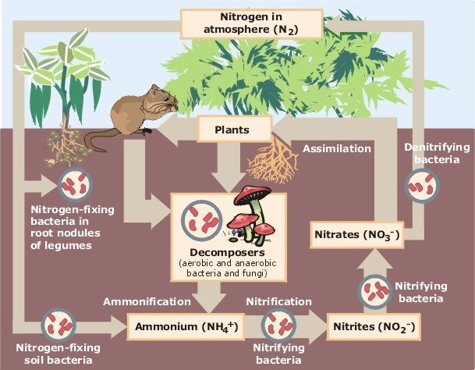
Legumes play a key role in the nitrogen cycle, making nitrates available to other plants in the soil.

In many traditional and organic farming practices, crop rotation or polyculture involving legumes is common. By alternating between legumes and non-legumes, or by growing both together for part of the growing season, the field can receive a sufficient amount of nitrogenous compounds to produce a good result without adding nitrogenous fertilizer. Legumes are accordingly often used as green manure, with crop residues ploughed back into the soil.

Sri Lanka developed the polyculture practice known as coconut-soybean intercropping. Grain legumes are grown in coconut (Cocos nuficera) groves in two ways: intercropping or as a cash crop. These are grown mainly for their protein, vegetable oil and ability to uphold soil fertility. However, continuous cropping after 3–4 years decrease grain yields significantly.

=== Pests and diseases ===
A common pest of grain legumes that is noticed in the tropical and subtropical Asia, Africa, Australia and Oceania are minuscule and highly destructive flies that belong to the family Agromyzidae, dubbed "bean flies". The host range of these flies is very wide amongst cultivated legumes. Infestation of plants starts from germination through to harvest, and they can destroy an entire crop in early stage. Black bean aphids are a serious pest to broad beans and other beans. Common hosts for this pest are fathen, thistle and dock. Pea weevils and bean weevils damage leaf margins, leaving characteristic semi-circular notches. Stem nematodes are very widespread but will be found more frequently in areas where host plants are grown.

Common legume diseases include anthracnose, caused by Colletotrichum trifolii; common leaf spot caused by Pseudomonas syringae pv. syringae; crown wart caused by Physoderma alfalfae; downy mildew caused by Peronospora trifoliorum; root rot caused by Fusarium spp.; rust caused by Uromyces striatus; crown and stem rot caused by Sclerotinia trifoliorum; Southern blight caused by Sclerotium rolfsii; pythium (browning) root rot caused by Pythium spp.; fusarium wilt caused by Fusarium oxysporum; root knot caused by Meloidogyne hapla. These are all classified as biotic problems.

Abiotic problems include nutrient deficiencies, (nitrogen, phosphorus, potassium, copper, magnesium, manganese, boron, zinc), pollutants (air, water, soil, pesticide injury, fertilizer burn), toxic concentration of minerals, and unfavorable growth conditions.

== Storage ==
Seed viability decreases with longer storage time. Studies of vetch, broad beans, and peas show that they last about 5 years in storage. Environmental factors that are important in influencing germination are relative humidity and temperature. Two rules apply to moisture content between 5 and 14 percent: the life of the seed will last longer if the storage temperature is reduced by 5 degree Celsius. Secondly, the storage moisture content will decrease if temperature is reduced by 1 degree Celsius.

== Uses ==
Cultivated legumes encompass a diverse range of agricultural classifications, spanning forage, grain, flowering, pharmaceutical/industrial, fallow/green manure, and timber categories. A notable characteristic of many commercially cultivated legume species is their versatility, often assuming multiple roles concurrently. The extent of these roles is contingent upon the stage of maturity at which they are harvested.

=== Food ===
Cost comparison of legumes, nuts and seeds compared to other food groups, 2021

Grain legumes are cultivated for their seeds, for humans and animals to eat, or for oils for industrial uses. Grain legumes include beans, lentils, lupins, peas, and peanuts.

Legumes are a key ingredient in vegan meat and dairy substitutes. They are growing in use as a plant-based protein source in the world marketplace. Products containing legumes grew by 39% in Europe between 2013 and 2017.

There is a common misconception that adding salt before cooking prevents them from cooking through. Legumes may not soften because they are old, or because of hard water or acidic ingredients in the pot; salting before cooking results in better seasoning.

Production of pulses

Pulse yield

Yearly per capita supply of pulses

==== Nutrition ====
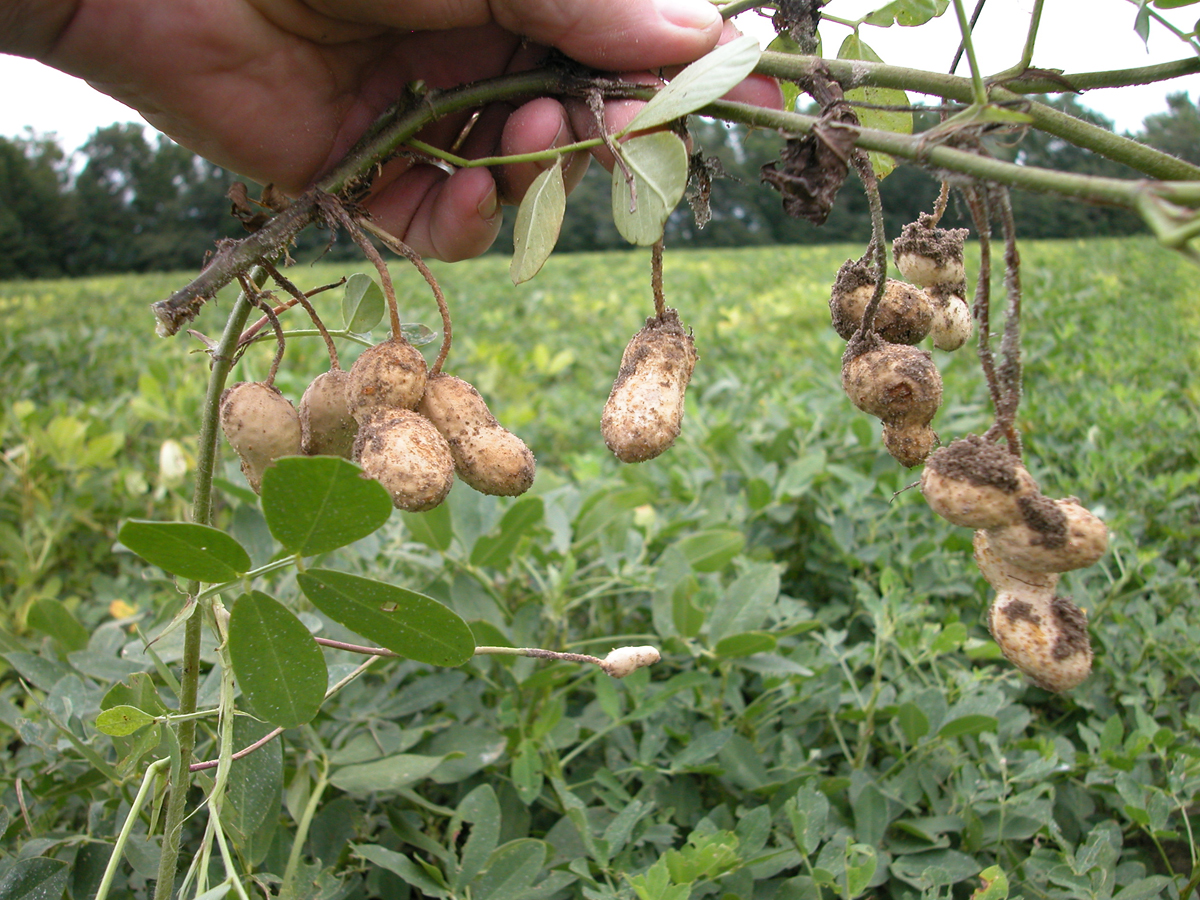
Freshly dug peanuts (Arachis hypogaea), indehiscent legume fruits

Legumes are a significant source of protein, dietary fibre, carbohydrates, and dietary minerals; for example, a 100-gram serving of cooked chickpeas contains 18 percent of the Daily Value (DV) for protein, 30 percent DV for dietary fiber, 43 percent DV for folate and 52 percent DV for manganese.

Legumes are an excellent source of resistant starch; this is broken down by bacteria in the large intestine to produce short-chain fatty acids (such as butyrate) used by intestinal cells for food energy.

=== Forage ===
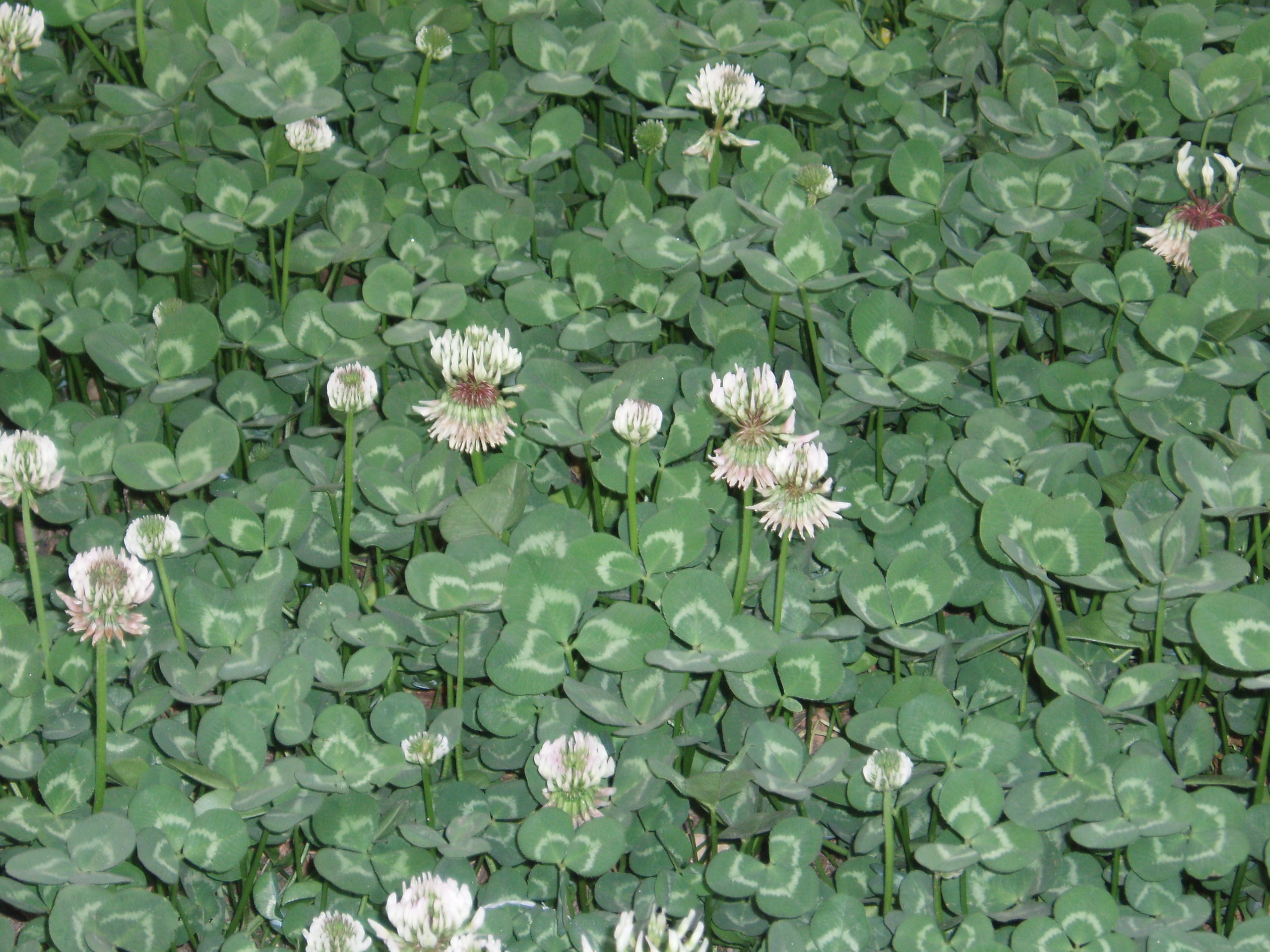
White clover, a forage crop

Forage legumes are of two broad types. Some, like alfalfa, clover, vetch (Vicia), stylo (Stylosanthes), or Arachis, are sown in pasture and grazed by livestock. Others, such as Leucaena or Albizia, are woody shrubs or trees that are either broken down by livestock or regularly cut by humans to provide fodder. Legume-based feeds improve animal performance over a diet of perennial grasses. Factors include larger consumption, faster digestion, and higher feed conversion rate.

The type of crop grown for animal rearing depends on the farming system. In cattle rearing, legume trees such as Gliricidia sepium can be planted along edges of fields to provide shade for cattle, the leaves and bark are often eaten by cattle. Green manure can be grown between harvesting the main crop and the planting of the next crop.

=== Other uses ===
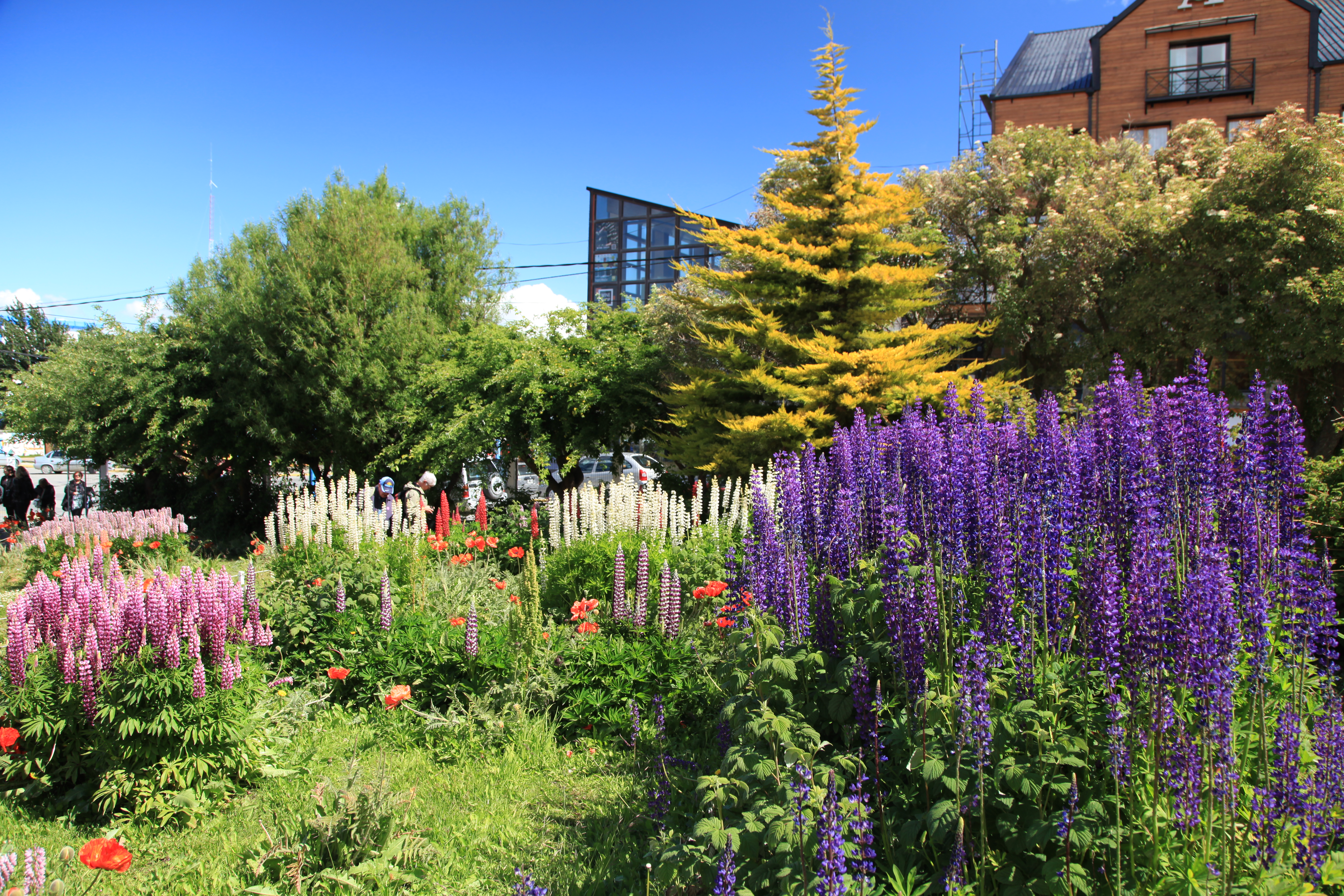
Lupin flower garden

Legume species grown for their flowers include lupins, which are farmed commercially for their blooms as well as being popular in gardens worldwide. Industrially farmed legumes include Indigofera and Acacia species, which are cultivated for dye and natural gum production, respectively. Fallow or green manure legume species are cultivated to be tilled back into the soil in order to exploit the high levels of captured atmospheric nitrogen found in the roots of most legumes. Numerous legumes farmed for this purpose include Leucaena, Cyamopsis, and Sesbania species. Various legume species are farmed for timber production worldwide, including numerous Acacia species and Castanospermum australe.

Some legume trees, like the honey locust (Gleditsia) can be used in agroforestry. Others, including the black locust (Robinia pseudoacacia), Kentucky coffeetree (Gymnocladus dioicus), Laburnum, and the woody climbing vine Wisteria, have poisonous elements.

== History ==
Neanderthals and early modern humans used wild pulses when cooking meals 70,000 to 40,000 years ago. Traces of pulse production have been found around the Ravi River (Punjab), the seat of the Indus Valley civilisation, from c. 3300 BC. Meanwhile, evidence of lentil cultivation has also been found in Egyptian pyramids and cuneiform recipes. Dry pea seeds have been discovered in a Swiss village that are believed to date back to the Stone Age. Archaeological evidence suggests that these peas must have been grown in the eastern Mediterranean and Mesopotamian regions at least 5,000 years ago and in Britain as early as the 11th century. The soybean was domesticated around 5,000 years ago in China from a descendant of the wild vine Glycine soja.

The oldest-known domesticated beans in the Americas were found in Guitarrero Cave, an archaeological site in Peru, and dated to around the second millennium BC. Genetic analyses of the common bean Phaseolus show that it originated in Mesoamerica, and subsequently spread southward, along with maize and squash, traditional companion crops. In the United States, the domesticated soybean was introduced in 1770 by Benjamin Franklin after he sent seeds to Philadelphia from France.

=== Year of Pulses ===
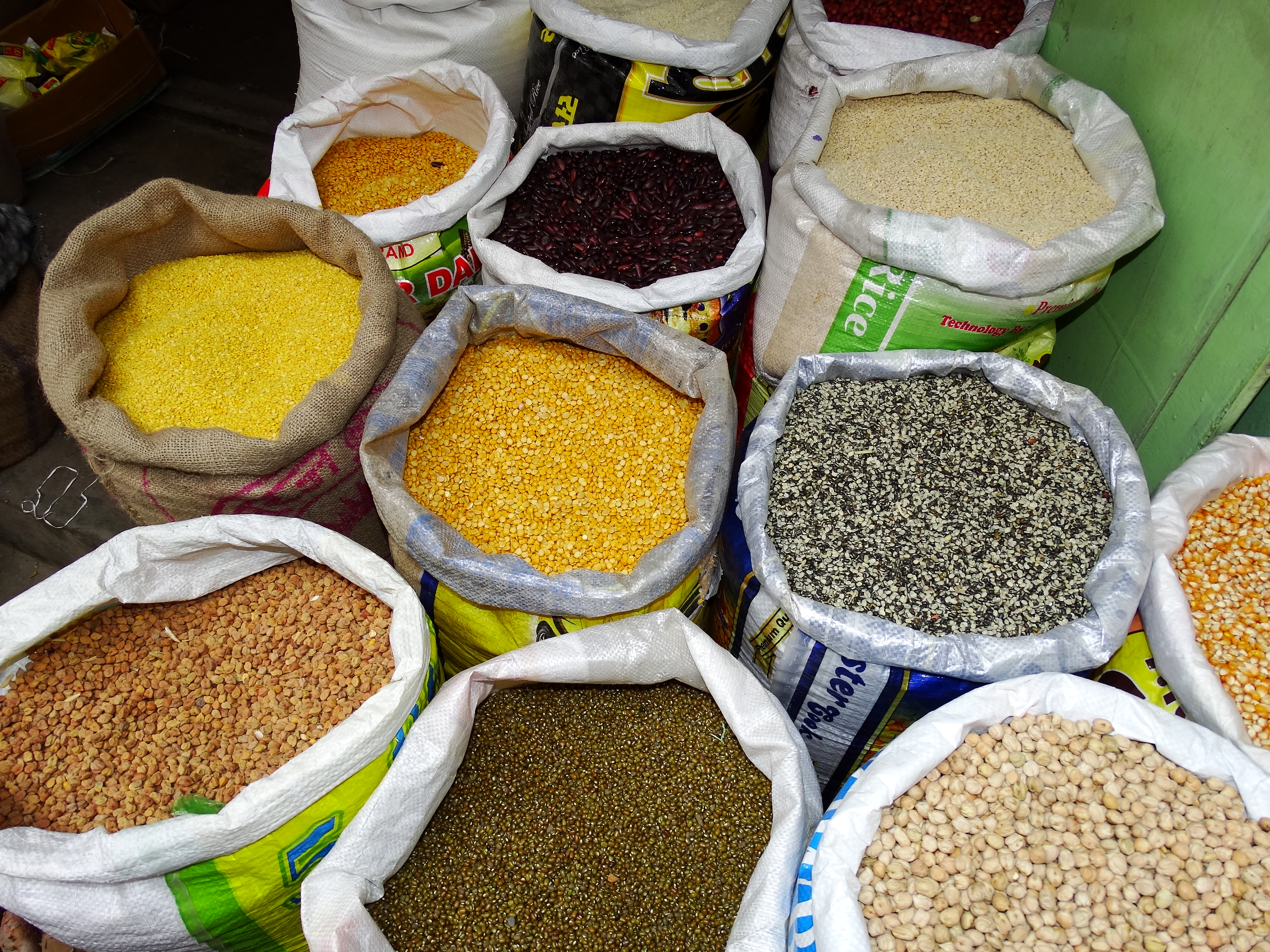
Pulses for sale in a Darjeeling market

The International Year of Pulses 2016 was declared by the Sixty-eighth session of the United Nations General Assembly. The Food and Agriculture Organization of the United Nations was nominated to facilitate the implementation of the year in collaboration with governments, relevant organizations, non-governmental organizations and other relevant stakeholders. Its aim was to heighten public awareness of the nutritional benefits of pulses as part of sustainable food production aimed towards food security and nutrition. The year created an opportunity to encourage connections throughout the food chain that would better use pulse-based proteins, further global production of pulses, better use crop rotations and address challenges in the global trade of pulses.

== See also ==
- Aquafaba
- Legume lectin
- List of bean soups
- List of dried foods
- List of legume dishes
- Peanut allergy
