= Alfalfa pests =

Alfalfa pests, pests specifically linked to alfalfa by name, may be:

== Insects ==
- Blue alfalfa aphid (Acyrthosiphon kondoi)
- Alfalfa bug (Piezodorus guildinii) a stink bug
- Alfalfa plant bug (Adelphocoris lineolatus)
- Alfalfa butterfly and alfalfa caterpillar (Colias eurytheme) a butterfly
- Alfalfa looper (Autographa californica) a moth
- Alfalfa moth (Cydia medicaginis) a moth
- Alfalfa leaf tier (Dichomeris acuminata) a moth that rolls alfalfa leaves
- Alfalfa webworm (Loxostege commixtalis) a moth
- Alfalfa webworm (Loxostege cereralis) a moth
- Alfalfa weevil (Hypera postica)

== Other ==
- Alfalfa cyst nematode (Heterodera medicaginis)
- Alfalfa dodder (Cuscuta approximata) a parasitic plant
- Large-seeded alfalfa dodder (Cuscuta campestris) a parasitic plant

== See also ==
- List of alfalfa diseases
- Alfalfa leafcutter bee (Megachile rotundata) which pollinates alfalfa
