= List of carnation diseases =

This article is a list of diseases of carnations (Dianthus caryophylium).

== Bacterial diseases ==
Bacterial diseases
Bacterial leaf spot	Burkholderia andropogonis = Pseudomonas androponis = P. woodsii
Bacterial wilt	Burkholderia caryophylli = Pseudomonas caryophylli
Bacterial slow wilt	Erwinia chrysanthemi
Crown gall	Agrobacterium tumefaciens
Fasciation	Rhodococcus fascians = Corynebacterium fascians

== Fungal diseases ==
Fungal diseases
Alternaria blight	Alternaria saponariae = Alternaria dianthi Alternaria dianthicola
Anther smut	Ustilago violacea
Calyx rot	Stemphylium botryosum Pleospora tarda [teleomorph]
Charcoal rot	Macrophomina phaseolina
Downy mildew	Peronospora dianthicola
Fairy-ring leaf spot	Mycosphaerella dianthi Cladosporium echinulatum [anamorph]
Fusarium bud rot	Fusarium tricinctum
Fusarium stem rot	Fusarium graminearum Gibberella zeae [teleomorph]
Fusarium wilt	Fusarium oxysporum f.sp. dianthi
Gray mold	Botrytis cinerea Botryotinia fuckeliana [teleomorph]
Greasy blotch	Zygophiala jamaicensis Schizothyrium pomi [teleomorph]
Phialophora wilt	Phialophora cinerescens
Phymatotrichum root rot (cotton root rot)	Phymatotrichopsis omnivora = Phymatotrichum omnivorum
Pythium root rot	Pythium spp. Pythium ultimum
Phytophthora wilt	Phytophthora nicotianae var. parasitica
Rhizoctonia stem rot	Rhizoctonia solani Thanatephorus cucumeris [teleomorph]
Rust	Uromyces dianthi
Sclerotinia flower rot	Sclerotinia sclerotiorum
Septoria leaf spot	Septoria dianthi
Southern blight	Sclerotium rolfsii Athelia rolfsii [teleomorph]

== Nematodes, parasitic ==
Nematodes, parasitic
Cyst	Heterodera trifolii
Lance	Hoplolaimus spp.
Lesion	Pratylenchus spp.
Pin	Paratylenchus hamatus
Ring	Mesocriconema spp. = Criconemella spp.
Root-knot	Meloidogyne spp.

== Viral diseases ==
Viral diseases
Carnation etched ring	genus Cauliovirus, Carnation etched ring virus (CERV)
Carnation latent	genus Carlavirus, Carnation latent virus (CLV)
Carnation mottle	genus Carmovirus, Carnation mottle virus (CarMV)
Carnation necrotic fleck & Carnation streak	genus Closterovirus, Carnation necrotic fleck virus (CNFV)
Carnation ring spot	genus Dianthovirus, Carnation ringspot virus (CRSV)
Carnation vein mottle	genus Potyvirus, Carnation vein mottle virus (CVMV)
