= C10H13NO4 =

The molecular formula C_{10}H_{13}NO_{4} may refer to:

- Farinomalein
- Methyldopa
- 3-O-Methyldopa
- Melevodopa
