= L. pratensis =

L. pratensis may refer to:

- Lathyrus pratensis, a perennial legume species
- Leptosphaeria pratensis, a plant pathogen species
