= Phytophthora sojae =

Scientific classification
- Domain: Eukaryota
- Clade: Sar
- Clade: Stramenopiles
- Phylum: Oomycota
- Class: Peronosporomycetes
- Order: Peronosporales
- Family: Peronosporaceae
- Genus: Phytophthora
- Species: P. sojae

Binomial name
- Phytophthora sojae Kaufm. & Gerd., 1958

Species of single-celled organism

Phytophthora sojae is an oomycete and a soil-borne plant pathogen that causes stem and root rot of soybean. This is a prevalent disease in most soybean growing regions, and a major cause of crop loss. In wet conditions the pathogen produces zoospores that move in water and are attracted to soybean roots. Zoospores can attach to roots, germinate, and infect the plant tissues. Diseased roots develop lesions that may spread up the stem and eventually kill the entire plant. Phytophthora sojae also produces oospores that can remain dormant in the soil over the winter, or longer, and germinate when conditions are favourable. Oospores may also be spread by animals or machinery.

Phytophthora sojae is a diploid organism with a genome size of 95 Mbp (Millions of base pairs).

The natural chemical farinomalein (a metabolite from entomopathogenic fungus Paecilomyces farinosus) has shown potent and selective inhibition (0.15-5 μg/disk) against eight isolates of plant pathogenic Phytophthora sojae. These results suggest that farinomalein might be useful as a candidate pesticide for the treatment of Phytophthora stem rot in soybean.

Phytophthora sojae is so similar to Phytophthora megasperma that they're often mistaken for each other. In the early years of research, Phytophthora sojae and Phytophthora medicaginis were respectively known as Phytophthora megasperma f. sp. glycines and Phytophthora megasperma f. sp. medicaginis. Recent discoveries about their molecular structure, however, proved that they were indeed unambiguous species.

== Hosts and symptoms ==
Phytophthora sojae infects soybean plants (Glycine max) and many members of the genus Lupinus. They have the ability to infect soybeans at any point during its development process, including during seed development.

They cause seed decay and pre- and postemergence damping off when the soil is flooded after planting. Seedling roots may appear to have light brown soft rot as soon as the seedlings begin to sprout from the soil.

It also causes root and stem rot and the severity of the infection depends on how susceptible or tolerant the plant is to pathogens. In a highly-tolerant soybean plant, the root rot will simply cause the plant to be stunted and slightly chlorotic instead of killing the plant. In contrast, infection of a low-tolerant soybean plant will most likely lead to the death of the plant. Infection initiates in the roots and then progresses several nodes up the stem, turning the root and the stem brown and the leaves yellow. As the pathogen progresses, the entire plant transforms into an orange-brown color. The wilted leaves bend towards the plant and remain attached as it succumbs to death.

Foliar blight is also a symptom of Phytophthora sojae, especially when the plant has recently experienced heavy rain. The soybean plant has an age-related resistance in which the older leaves are not susceptible to foliar blight.

Soybean fields infected with Phytophthora sojae can be easily spotted by looking for stunted soybean plants or looking for empty patches where the soybean seed had been planted.

Microscopic identification of an oospore that measure around 40 micrometers in diameter from a soybean plant sample is a definite sign of Phytophthora sojae. Oospores, in general, measure around 20-45 micrometers in diameter and have very thick cellulose cell walls for overwintering.

== Disease cycle ==
Phytophthora sojae overwinters in plant debris and soil as oospores. Oospores are made after the male gamete, antheridium, and female gamete, oogonium, undergo fertilization and then sexual recombination (meiosis). They possess thick cell walls with cellulose that enables them to survive harsh conditions in the soil without germinating for several years. They begin to germinate once the environmental condition is favorable during spring (see § Environment) and produce sporangia. They can either germinate directly or indirectly. In direct germination, sporangia directly penetrate the host cells at the plant's root tips (if it's within reach). Indirect germination involves sporangia releasing zoospores (if the root is at a farther distance from the sporangia) which encyst on the host plant cells and germinate. Zoospores are biflagellate asexual motile spores. They are dispersed by water flow in the soil and are able to inoculate the roots of plants or seeds. Chemicals such as daidzeins and genistein are released at the tip of the plant roots which attract the liberated zoospores.

Once zoospores have made contact with the host root, they encyst on the surface, break down the plant cell wall with proteolytic enzymes and begin to germinate. Their hyphae will begin to grow through the intercellular space of the plant cells. After establishing its haustoria for nutrients, more oospores will begin to form in the cortical cells of the root. The host plant will begin to exhibit secondary symptoms such as stem canker, wilting, and chlorosis as Phytophthora sojae continue to reproduce. This continuous reproduction renders the plant dead at the end of the season. The oospores are then left to overwinter in the dead plant's debris and the soil. The cycle is repeated once again in the spring when environmental conditions are favorable (see § Environment). The disease is mostly localized where zoospores initially infected the host plant.

Phytophthora sojae is considered to be a monocyclic pathogen and has one effective infection in its cycle. This is because the oospores don't germinate together at the same time; rather they each have their own distinct favorable condition in which they'll initiate their germination.

== Environment ==
Phytophthora sojae favor fields that are poorly drained or highly-susceptible to flooding. Solving it only by creating optimal drainage does not restrict the pathogen because the field may be subject to continuous heavy rain which induces flooding. Similar to other Phytophthora, warm soil, intermittent rain (including the rain splashes that results from rain), and windy weather are favorable conditions for development and the spread of the disease respectively. The optimum temperature for its disease development is above 60 °F (16 °C).

== Management ==
Host resistance is the primary method of control for Phytophthora sojae. There are three types of resistance: R gene mediated resistance, root resistance, and partial resistance. Currently there are 14 Rps genes, meaning 14 different single-resistance genes, which have been identified for R-gene mediated resistance and mapped in the soybean genome. Effectively, the most damage that the oomycete can induce is a lesion. Root resistance is inherited and is generally expressed in the roots. In this case, the stem of a germinating seedling is most susceptible. Once the first leaves begin to emerge, the partial resistance of the plant is expressed. Colonization is reduced and lesions are smaller in comparison. This management prevents the zoospores from germinating in the root tip and therefore unable to produce hyphae, which it needs to survive.

Phytophthora sojae can also be controlled using fungicides. For example, Metalaxyl, a fungicide that is specifically used for oomycetes, is used for treating soybean seeds. It's used to prevent seed decay and pre-emergence damping off. This fungicide has been observed to be more effective on highly-tolerant soybean plants. Metalaxyl is most effective when applied to the soil as it allows the plant to take it up through the roots and elongate the control period in comparison to a seed application. Metalaxyl prevents the spores of Phytophthora sojae from entering the soybean plant tissues. As with all fungicides, Metalaxyl is effective for prevention only and should be applied before the disease has established itself inside the tissues of the soybean plant. Replanting must be done once severe pre-emergence damping off is observed.

Improving field drainage and soil tillage are cultural practices that can help minimize the effect of Phytophthora sojae. Improving soil tillage can help eliminate oospores from the soil. Oospores are very sturdy and can remain stagnant in the soil for a long time and therefore crop rotation alone is not effective. Proper field drainage prevents flooding and therefore inhibit zoospore movement towards the host.

== Importance ==
Phytophthora root and stem rot of soybean was first observed in the United States in Indiana in 1948 and its causal agent, Phytophthora sojae, first identified in 1958. In the 1970s, soybean plants only had one single-resistance gene, meaning they were more susceptible to an infection. Eventually plants with this gene were killed by new races of Phytophthora sojae. As a result, several states suffered significant yield losses particularly in the state of Ohio, which lost 300,000 acres of soybean plants in a year. Soon thereafter, a variety of new disease prevention methods were implemented and as a result this disease is currently one of the well-managed and well-known soybean diseases in the USA.

== Origin ==
Recently there's been evidence that soybean plants from South Korea and China had a diversity of resistance that is much higher in these countries compared to other soybean-cultivating nations. This indicates that soybean plants have been around in these areas longer and thus had more time to develop resistance against a variety of diseases including Phytophthora sojae.
