= Heterodera trifolii =

Scientific classification
- Domain: Eukaryota
- Kingdom: Animalia
- Phylum: Nematoda
- Class: Secernentea
- Order: Tylenchida
- Family: Heteroderidae
- Genus: Heterodera
- Species: H. trifolii

Binomial name
- Heterodera trifolii Goffart, 1932

Species of roundworm

Heterodera trifolii is a plant pathogenic nematode.

== See also ==
- List of alfalfa diseases
- List of beet diseases
- List of spinach diseases
- List of red clover diseases
- List of carnation diseases
