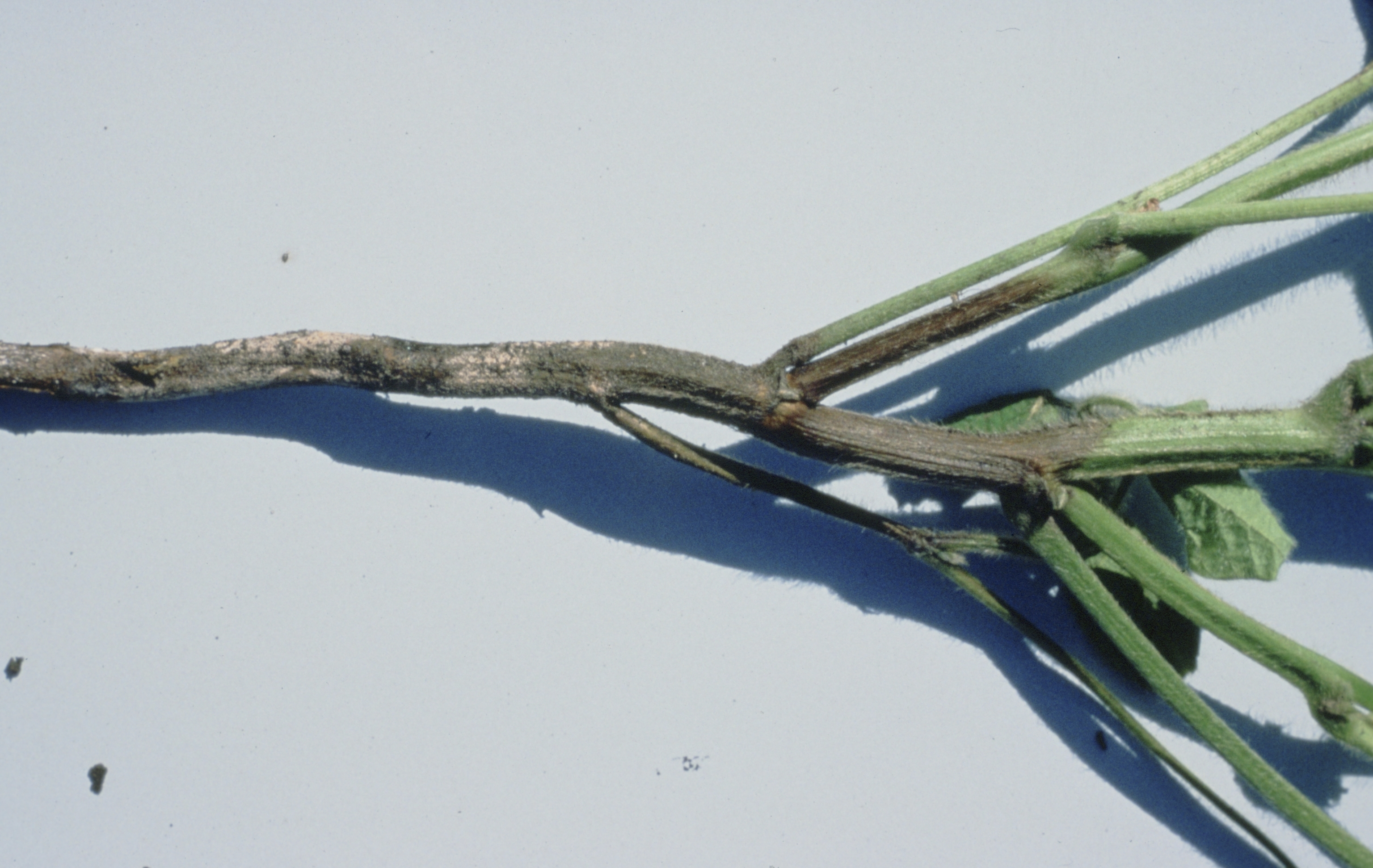
- Symptoms of Phytophthora megasperma on soybean

Scientific classification
- Domain: Eukaryota
- Clade: Sar
- Clade: Stramenopiles
- Phylum: Oomycota
- Class: Peronosporomycetes
- Order: Peronosporales
- Family: Peronosporaceae
- Genus: Phytophthora
- Species: P. megasperma

Binomial name
- Phytophthora megasperma Drechsler, (1931)

Synonyms
- Pythiomorpha miyabeana S. Ito & Nagai, (1931)

= Phytophthora megasperma =

Species of single-celled organism

Phytophthora megasperma is a species of water mould in the family Peronosporaceae. It is well known as a plant pathogen with many hosts. It often causes a plant disease called root rot.

== Taxonomy ==
This is a poorly defined species which is generally called a species complex. Its name applies to water moulds of many forms, functions, and host preferences, many of which are actually different species which have not yet been separated and described. Some species previously treated as part of the complex include Phytophthora rosacearum, P. sansomeana, P. sojae, P. medicaginis, and P. trifolii. A form of P. megasperma is suspected to be a separate species when it is recognized to have host specificity, when it is found attacking just one host plant; alfalfa in the case of P. medicaginis, for example.

== Host species ==
Water moulds in the P. megasperma complex can be found on a multitude of host plants, including many agricultural crops. It has been noted on soybeans, kiwifruit (Actinidia chinensis var. deliciosa), horse chestnut (Aesculus hippocastanum), hollyhock (Alcea rosea), asparagus (Asparagus officinalis), Brassica oleracea, crops such as cabbage, cauliflower, safflower (Carthamus tinctorius), Port Orford cedar (Chamaecyparis lawsoniana), chickpea (Cicer arietinum), carrot (Daucus carota), carnation (Dianthus caryophyllus), eucalyptus (Eucalyptus spp.), walnut (Juglans regia), apple (Malus domestica), pines (Pinus spp.), stone fruit such as apricot, cherry, plum, and peach, Douglas fir (Pseudotsuga menziesii), sugarcane (Saccharum officinarum), and potato (Solanum tuberosum).
