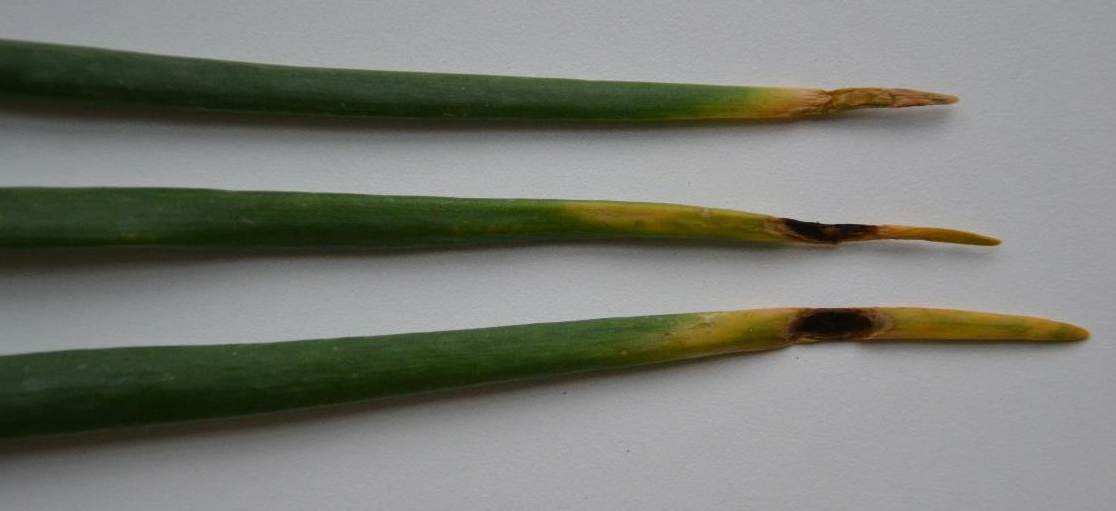
- Chives (Allium schoenoprasum) with a Stemphylium botryosum infestation on the leaf tips.

Scientific classification
- Domain: Eukaryota
- Kingdom: Fungi
- Division: Ascomycota
- Class: Dothideomycetes
- Order: Pleosporales
- Family: Pleosporaceae
- Genus: Stemphylium
- Species: S. botryosum

Binomial name
- Stemphylium botryosum Wallr., (1833)

Synonyms
- Pleospora tarda E.G. Simmons, Sydowia 38: 291 (1986); Stemphylium botryosum subsp. asperulum Sacc., Michelia 2(no. 7): 376 (1881); Stemphylium botryosum var. domesticum Sacc., Syll. fung. (Abellini) 4: 522 (1886); Stemphylium domesticum (Sacc.) Mussat, in Saccardo, Syll. fung. (Abellini) 15: 402 (1901); Stemphylium botryosum var. caulium Roum., Revue mycol., Toulouse 9(no. 33): 29 (1887); Stemphylium botryosum var. tragopogonis Linn, Phytopathology 32: 154 (1942); Stemphylium botryosum f. lactucum Padhi & Snyder, Phytopathology 44: 179 (1954); Stemphylium botryosum var. majus Bat. & J.L. Bezerra [as 'major'], Publicações Inst. Micol. Recife 343: 17 (1962)

= Stemphylium botryosum =

Species of fungus

Stemphylium botryosum (family Pleosporaceae, order Pleosporales) is a species of fungi and plant pathogen infecting several hosts including alfalfa, red clover, peanut, soybean, lentils, beet, tomato, lettuce, hemp and carnations.

It was originally found on Medicago sativa (Alfalfa) in Ontario, Canada and named as Pleospora tarda E.G Simmons but it was later found to be the anamorph of Stemphylium botryosum Wallr. 1833.

== See also ==
- List of soybean diseases
