= Meloidogyne javanica =

Scientific classification
- Kingdom: Animalia
- Phylum: Nematoda
- Class: Secernentea
- Order: Tylenchida
- Family: Heteroderidae
- Genus: Meloidogyne
- Species: M. javanica

Binomial name
- Meloidogyne javanica (Treub, 1885)

Species of roundworm

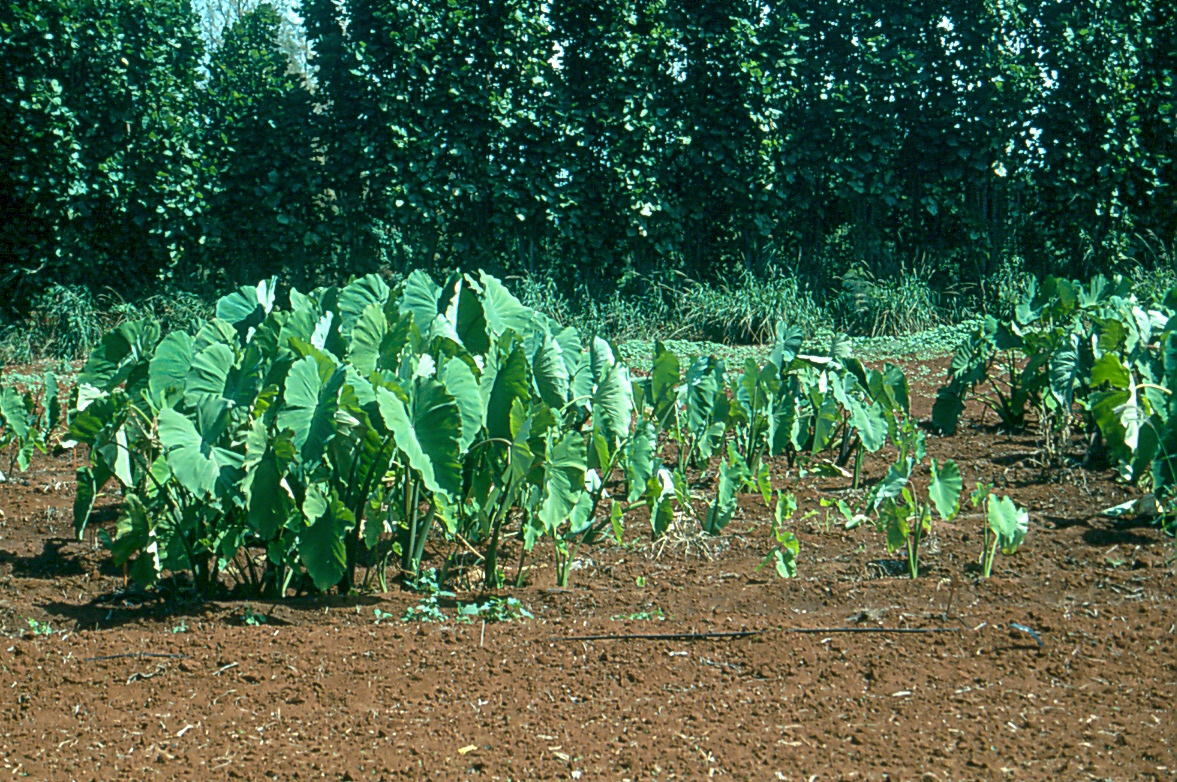
Root knot of taro (Meloidogyne javanica) caused by Colocasia esculenta, showing the severe stunting of plants in non-fumigated plot (right).

Meloidogyne javanica is a species of plant-pathogenic nematodes. It is one of the tropical root-knot nematodes and a major agricultural pest in many countries. It has many hosts. Meloidogyne javanica reproduces by obligatory mitotic parthenogenesis (apomixis).

== Hosts ==
Meloidogyne javanica is a nematode pathogen that affects over 770 species of plants (Cabi 2018). The hosts of this pathogen include both weeds and crops of economic importance. Those of economic importance include tea, grapevine, vegetables, fruit trees, cereals, and ornamentals (Cabi 2018). Meloidogyne javanica is considered an agricultural pest, as it is extremely abundant and damaging (Alford 2012).

== Symptoms ==
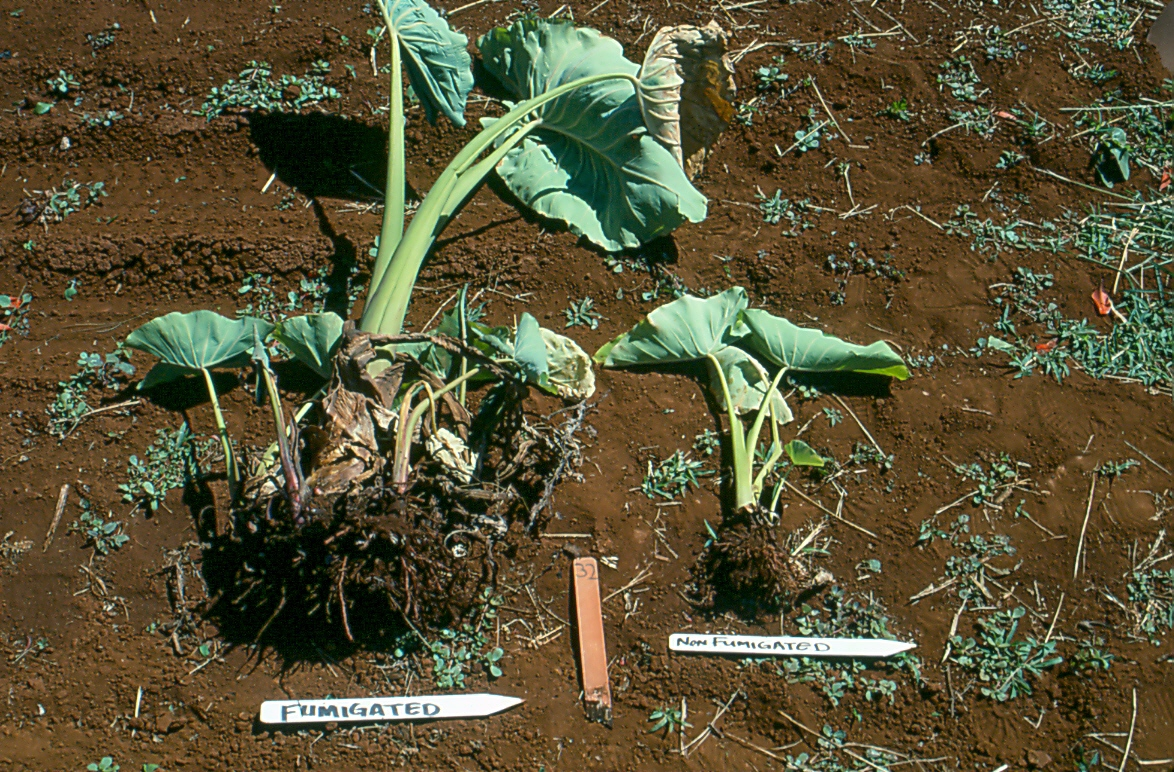
Meloidogyne javanica on Colocasia esculenta

Because there are so many different hosts for this pathogen, the symptoms are very variable. Common symptoms include abnormal leaf color, abnormal leaf form, wilting leaves, galls, swollen roots, reduced root system, dwarfing and senescence (Cabi 2018). This pathogen does the most damage when present in light soils with hot weather conditions (Alford 2012).

== Diagnosis ==
=== Morphological characteristics ===
Because there are many plant hosts and variable symptoms, it is important when diagnosing Meloidogyne javanica to obtain a specimen of the nematode from symptomatic plant tissue. The most commonly utilized diagnostic techniques are the use of morphological characteristics of the nematode species (Cunha et al. 2018). Head shape and stylet morphology of males are useful characteristics in the identification of M. javanica. When specimens are placed in the lateral position, the distance between the dorsal esophageal gland orifice to the stylet base can be used to distinguish between species of Meloidogyne (Cunha et al. 2018). In the case of M. javanica, the distance between these two features is relatively short (2.0–3.0 μm). Additionally, M. javanica can be diagnosed by looking at the perineal pattern of females. The shape of the perineal region, dorsal arch, dorsal striae, lateral lines and phasmids are all characteristics useful in identification.

=== Biochemical ===
Biochemical diagnostic methods are commonly used when diagnosing nematode diseases. One frequently utilized technique is isoenzyme phenotyping (Cunha et al. 2018). Protein extract from M. javanica is applied to a gel electrophoresis to use as a reference phenotype. This analysis is based on the mobility of the enzymes in the extracted protein, which is diagnostic of different species of Meloidogyne (Cunha et al. 2018).

=== Molecular ===
There are many molecular techniques that are becoming increasingly more common, as they are easy, quick, and cheap (Cunha et al. 2018). Species-specific PCR is commonly utilized, which uses species-specific primers to target certain nematodes based on SCAR (sequence-characterized amplified region) (Qiu et al. 2006, Cunha et al. 2018). These markers are used for species-specific diagnosis of Meloidogyne (Cunha et al. 2018).

== Management ==
=== Biocontrol ===
One management strategy being used to control Meloidogyne javanica is a plant growth-promoting bacteria (Escobar et al. 2015). This biocontrol is specifically utilized in tomatoes, where fluorescent pseudomonads produce an antibiotic, 2,4-diacetylphloroglucinol (DAPG). When DAPG is produced, it induces resistance in tomatoes against the root knot nematode, Meloidogyne javanica (Escobar et al. 2015). Another biocontrol with proven success in controlling Meloidogyne javanica is the fungus Trichoderma harzianum. According to Sahbani and Hadavi (2008), the fungus is able to infect nematode eggs and juveniles and destroy them, consequently decreasing nematode infection. Extracts of the beetle Mylabris quadripunctata shows antiparasitic activity in the laboratory against the M. javanica.

=== Chemical ===
Another control strategy is chemical control; however, this is being used less and less due to the toxicity and contamination potential (Escobar et al. 2015). The specific chemical control utilized is nematicide toxins, including Aldicarb, Enzon, Oxamyl, and Cadusafos (Rugby). The most effective nematicide against Meloidogyne javanica is Rugby in a dosage of 8 ppm (Soltani 2013). The chemical control can be used throughout the nematodes life cycle, as the nematicide can kill the nematode at any stage. Additionally, a more recent development in the management of Meloidogyne javanica is seed treatment. Treating seeds with abamectin before planting to has been proven effective against Meloidogyne javanica (Almeida, 2018).

=== Cultural practices ===
A cultural practice used to control Meloidogyne javanica is crop rotation with non-host species or resistant cultivars. Rotation crops such as marigolds, perennial grasses, and bermudagrass have been successful in suppressing the disease caused by M. Javanica (Escobar et al. 2015). This management style is effective when the nematodes are host-specific, as rotating with a non-host crop eliminates the pathogen's ability to infect.

== Pathogenesis ==
Because Meloidogyne javanica affects many hosts, there are different host–parasite relationships.

=== Potatoes ===
When Meloidogyne javanica infects potatoes, the pathogen specifically infects the tubers and roots. The tubers reveal that the nematode is present in the outermost layer of the tuber, including the vascular ring, and is surrounded by 3–6 large giant cells (Vovlas 2005). In addition, when M. javanica infects the root, the female finds its permanent feeding site where it is surrounded by 3–4 large giant cells. The nematode induces the plant to form large multinucleate giant cells adjacent to the stele tissue, modifying the structure of the vascular cylinder. This hyperplasia in the roots caused the formation of galls (Vovlas 2005).

=== Wheat ===
When M. javanica infects wheat, galls are produced on young and old roots. The roots infested with the pathogen contain 5–6 giant cells with hypertrophic nuclei causing the interruption of vascular bundles in the stellar area (Kheir 1979). Because the nematode body expands when it feeds on the cells, the cortical cells get compressed and the stele structure is modified, causing gall formation (Kheir 1979).

Overall, when M. javanica infects a plant, the plant is instructed by the pathogen to produce giant cells, which modifies the structure of the stele tissue and causes the formation of galls.

== Infected plants ==
See:

- List of potato diseases
- List of alfalfa diseases
- List of African violet diseases
- List of soybean diseases
- List of lentil diseases
- List of almond diseases
- List of apricot diseases
- List of banana and plantain diseases
- List of butterfly flower diseases
- List of tea diseases
- List of tobacco diseases
- List of sweet potato diseases
- List of sunflower diseases
- List of red clover diseases
- List of primula diseases
- List of pineapple diseases
- List of pigeonpea diseases
- List of Capsicum diseases
- List of pecan diseases
- List of peanut diseases
- List of peach and nectarine diseases
- List of papaya diseases
- List of Jerusalem cherry diseases
- List of hop diseases
- List of hemp diseases
- List of grape diseases
- List of date palm diseases
- List of cineraria diseases
- List of chickpea diseases
- List of foliage plant diseases (Maranthaceae)
