= Acrocalymma =

Scientific classification
- Kingdom: Fungi
- Division: Ascomycota
- Class: Dothideomycetes
- Order: Pleosporales
- Family: Lophiostomataceae
- Genus: Acrocalymma; Alcorn & J.A.G.Irwin (1987)

Type species
- Acrocalymma medicaginis Alcorn & J.A.G.Irwin (1987)

Species
- A. aquatica A. medicaginis

Genus of fungi

Acrocalymma is a fungal genus in the family Lophiostomataceae. It was circumscribed in 1987 by Australian botanists John L. Alcorn and John Irwin to contain the species A. medicaginis, found to cause crown and root disease of alfalfa (Medicago sativa). The genus name is derived from the Ancient Greek words acros ("at tip") and calymma ("hood"). Acrocalymma aquatica, discovered in northern Thailand, was added to the genus in 2012.
