= Urophlyctis trifolii =

Scientific classification
- Domain: Eukaryota
- Kingdom: Fungi
- Division: Blastocladiomycota
- Class: Physodermatomycetes
- Order: Physodermatales
- Family: Physodermataceae
- Genus: Physoderma
- Species: P. trifolii

Binomial name
- Physoderma trifolii (Pass.) Magnus

Species of fungus

Urophlyctis trifolii is a plant pathogen infecting red clover.
