= Acrocalymma medicaginis =

Scientific classification
- Domain: Eukaryota
- Kingdom: Fungi
- Division: Ascomycota
- Class: Dothideomycetes
- Order: Pleosporales
- Family: Lophiostomataceae
- Genus: Acrocalymma
- Species: A. medicaginis

Binomial name
- Acrocalymma medicaginis Alcorn & J.A.G.Irwin (1987)

Species of fungus

Acrocalymma medicaginis is a plant pathogen that causes root and crown rot in alfalfa. It is found in Australia.
