= Lucerne Australian symptomless virus =

Virus classification
- (unranked): Virus
- Realm: Riboviria
- Kingdom: Orthornavirae
- Phylum: Pisuviricota
- Class: Pisoniviricetes
- Order: Picornavirales
- Family: Secoviridae
- Genus: Nepovirus
- Species: Nepovirus australiaense

Synonyms
- Lucerne Australian latent virus SM strain

Species of virus

Lucerne Australian symptomless virus (LASV) is a plant pathogenic virus of the genus Nepovirus.

It is a tentative sadwavirus, identified on the plant Medicago sativa which was introduced to Australia.
