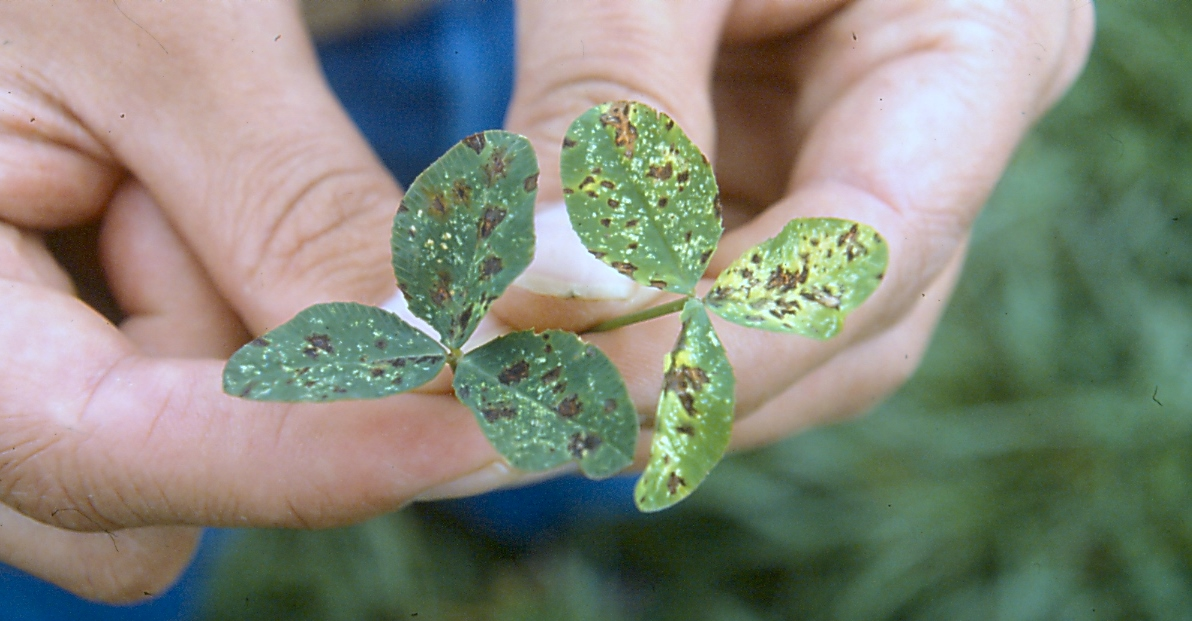
- Robbsia andropogonis leaf spot of white clover (Trifolium repens)

Scientific classification
- Domain: Bacteria
- Kingdom: Pseudomonadati
- Phylum: Pseudomonadota
- Class: Betaproteobacteria
- Order: Burkholderiales
- Family: Burkholderiaceae
- Genus: Robbsia
- Species: R. andropogonis

Binomial name
- Robbsia andropogonis (Smith 1911) Lopes-Santos et al. 2017

Synonyms
- Pseudomonas andropogonis Smith 1911; Bacterium andropogoni [sic] Smith 1911; Aplanobacter stizolobii Wolf 1920; Pseudomonas stizolobii (Wolf 1920) Stapp 1935; Pseudomonas woodsii (Smith 1911) Stevens 1925; Burkholderia andropogonis (Smith 1911) Gillis et al. 1995; Paraburkholderia andropogonis (Smith 1911) Sawana et al. 2015

= Robbsia andropogonis =

Species of bacterium

Robbsia andropogonis is a soil bacterium that can cause leaf, bud, and stem spotting on carnation, although it is not a disease of great economical significance.
