= Massarina walkeri =

Scientific classification
- Domain: Eukaryota
- Kingdom: Fungi
- Division: Ascomycota
- Class: Dothideomycetes
- Order: Pleosporales
- Family: Massarinaceae
- Genus: Massarina
- Species: M. walkeri

Binomial name
- Massarina walkeri Shoemaker, C.E. Babc. & J.A.G. Irwin, (1991)

Synonyms
- Acrocalymma medicaginis Alcorn & J.A.G. Irwin 1987

Species of fungus

Massarina walkeri is a plant pathogen fungi. It attacks medicago sativa and has been found in Queensland, Australia.
