= Farinomalein =

Names
- Preferred IUPAC name 3-[2,5-Dioxo-3-(propan-2-yl)-2,5-dihydro-1H-pyrrol-1-yl]propanoic acid
- Other names 2,5-Dihydro-3-(1-methylethyl)-2,5-dioxo-1H-pyrrole-1-propanoic acid

Identifiers
CAS Number	1175521-35-3
3D model (JSmol)	Interactive image
ChEMBL	ChEMBL1082049
ChemSpider	24674945
PubChem CID	44254797
UNII	X32ZX6P3ZV
CompTox Dashboard (EPA)	DTXSID50658055
- InChI: InChI=1S/C10H13NO4/c1-6(2)7-5-8(12)11(10(7)15)4-3-9(13)14/h5-6H,3-4H2,1-2H3,(H,13,14) Key: UWAZSQUZHSRNTR-UHFFFAOYSA-N
- SMILES: CC(C)C1=CC(=O)N(C1=O)CCC(=O)O

Properties
Chemical formula	C_{10}H_{13}NO_{4}
Molar mass	211.217 g·mol^{−1}
Appearance	White powder
Melting point	75 to 77 °C (167 to 171 °F; 348 to 350 K)
Solubility	CH_{2}Cl_{2}, acetone, toluene, CH_{3}OH
Vapor pressure	0 mmHg (25 °C)
- Except where otherwise noted, data are given for materials in their standard state (at 25 °C [77 °F], 100 kPa). Infobox references

Farinomalein is a natural maleimide with formula C_{10}H_{13}NO_{4} - was first isolated from the entomopathogenic fungus Isaria farinosa (Paecilomyces farinosus) - source H599 (Japan).

Farinomalein has shown potent and selective inhibition (0.15-5 μg/disk) against eight isolates of plant pathogenic Phytophthora sojae. These results suggest that farinomalein might be useful as a candidate pesticide for the treatment of Phytophthora stem rot in soybean.

== Synthesis ==
A simple two-stage synthesis from the γ-hydroxybutenolide compound, 5-hydroxy-4-methyl-2-5(H)-furanone, has been reported. Firstly, the furanone is oxidized to 3-isopropylfuran-2,5-dione by Dess–Martin periodinane, followed by acetic acid reflux with beta-alanine. The white powdered product has a melting point of 75-77 °C.
