= Coprinopsis psychromorbida =

Scientific classification
- Kingdom: Fungi
- Division: Basidiomycota
- Class: Agaricomycetes
- Order: Agaricales
- Family: Psathyrellaceae
- Genus: Coprinopsis
- Species: C. psychromorbida

Binomial name
- Coprinopsis psychromorbida (Redhead & Traquair) Redhead, Vilgalys & Moncalvo (2001)

Synonyms
- Coprinus psychromorbidus Redhead & Traquair (1981)

Pathogenic fungus

Coprinopsis psychromorbida or cottony snow mold is a cause of snow mold. It is a basidiomycete, a psychrophile, and a plant pathogen.

== Physiology ==
C. psychromorbida can thrive at least down to −5 °C (23 °F), optimally 5–10 °C (41–50 °F), and ceases growth at 25 °C (77 °F).

== Hosts ==
Grows as a snow mold in wheat, rye, and other grasses (Poaceae) and can also cause storage rotting in apple and pear.
