= Stemphylium alfalfae =

Scientific classification
- Kingdom: Fungi
- Division: Ascomycota
- Class: Dothideomycetes
- Order: Pleosporales
- Family: Pleosporaceae
- Genus: Stemphylium
- Species: S. alfalfae

Binomial name
- Stemphylium alfalfae E.G. Simmons, (1986)

Synonyms
- Pleospora alfalfae E.G. Simmons 1986

Species of fungus

Stemphylium alfalfae is a plant pathogen infecting alfalfa.
