= Cylindrocarpon magnusianum =

Scientific classification
- Domain: Eukaryota
- Kingdom: Fungi
- Division: Ascomycota
- Class: Sordariomycetes
- Order: Hypocreales
- Family: Nectriaceae
- Genus: Cylindrocarpon
- Species: C. magnusianum

Binomial name
- Cylindrocarpon magnusianum Wollenw. (1928)

Species of fungus

Cylindrocarpon magnusianum is a fungal plant pathogen that causes root rot in alfalfa and red clover.
