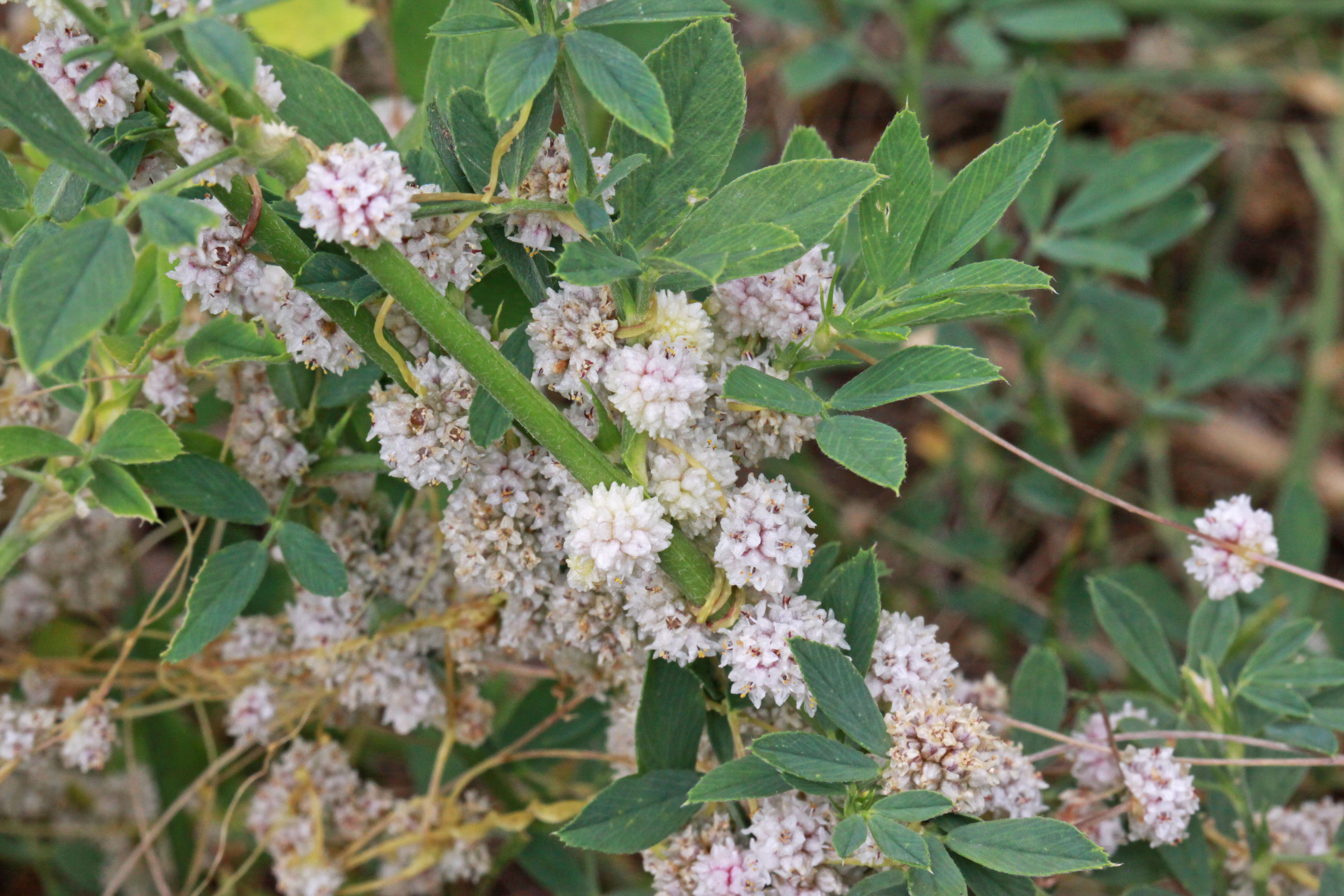

Scientific classification
- Kingdom: Plantae
- Clade: Tracheophytes
- Clade: Angiosperms
- Clade: Eudicots
- Clade: Asterids
- Order: Solanales
- Family: Convolvulaceae
- Genus: Cuscuta
- Species: C. approximata

Binomial name
- Cuscuta approximata Bab.

= Cuscuta approximata =

Species of flowering plant

Cuscuta approximata is a species of dodder known by the common name alfalfa dodder. It is native to Eurasia and Africa, but it is also found in North America, where it is an introduced species and uncommon noxious weed. It is a parasitic vine which climbs other plants and takes nutrition directly from them via a haustorium. The dodder resembles a pile of light yellow to orange-red straw wrapped tightly around its host plant. It is mostly stem; the leaves are reduced to scales on the stem's surface, since they are not needed for photosynthesis while the dodder is obtaining nutrients from its host. It bears clusters of tiny yellowish bell-shaped flowers which are only about 3 millimeters wide. The dodder reproduces by seed, with each plant capable of producing over 10,000 seeds at once. This plant is a weed of alfalfa, clover, and tomatoes, as well as other crop plants and native flora. This species is sometimes treated as a subspecies of Cuscuta epithymum.
