= Sporonema phacidioides =

Scientific classification
- Kingdom: Fungi
- Division: Ascomycota
- Class: Leotiomycetes
- Order: Helotiales
- Family: Drepanopezizaceae
- Genus: Sporonema
- Species: S. phacidioides

Binomial name
- Sporonema phacidioides Desm. (1847)

Species of fungus

Sporonema phacidioides is a plant pathogen infecting alfalfa.
