= Uromyces trifolii-repentis var. fallens =

Scientific classification
- Kingdom: Fungi
- Division: Basidiomycota
- Class: Pucciniomycetes
- Order: Pucciniales
- Family: Pucciniaceae
- Genus: Uromyces
- Species: U. trifolii-repentis
- Variety: U. t. var. fallens

Trinomial name
- Uromyces trifolii-repentis var. fallens (Arthur) Cummins, (1977)

Synonyms
- Nigredo fallens Arthur, (1912); Trichobasis fallens Cooke, J. Bot., (1864); Uromyces fallens (Arthur) Barthol., (1928); Uromyces trifolii var. fallens (Arthur) Arthur

Species of fungus

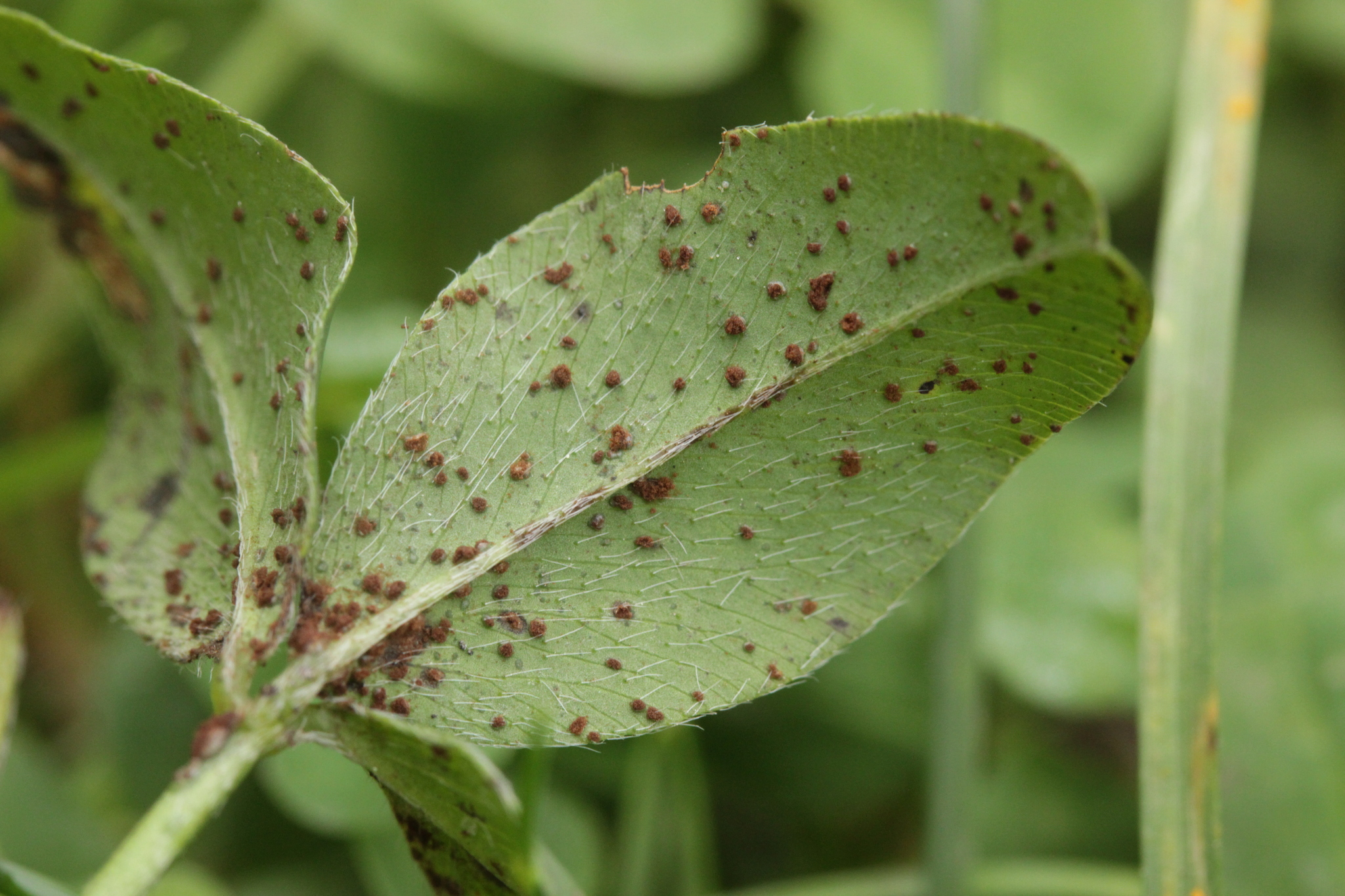
Uromyces trifolii-repentis var. falling out of the trefoil

Uromyces trifolii-repentis var. fallens is a plant pathogen infecting red clover. Its first detection in Pakistan was in 1990 in the Kaghan Valley. The pathogen is more commonly known as red clover rust. Infected plants will develop yellow spots that eventually brown and become pustules. Preventative measures include minimizing environmental moisture and applying fungicide. Once a plant is infected, it cannot be cured.
