= Snow mold =

Type of fungus

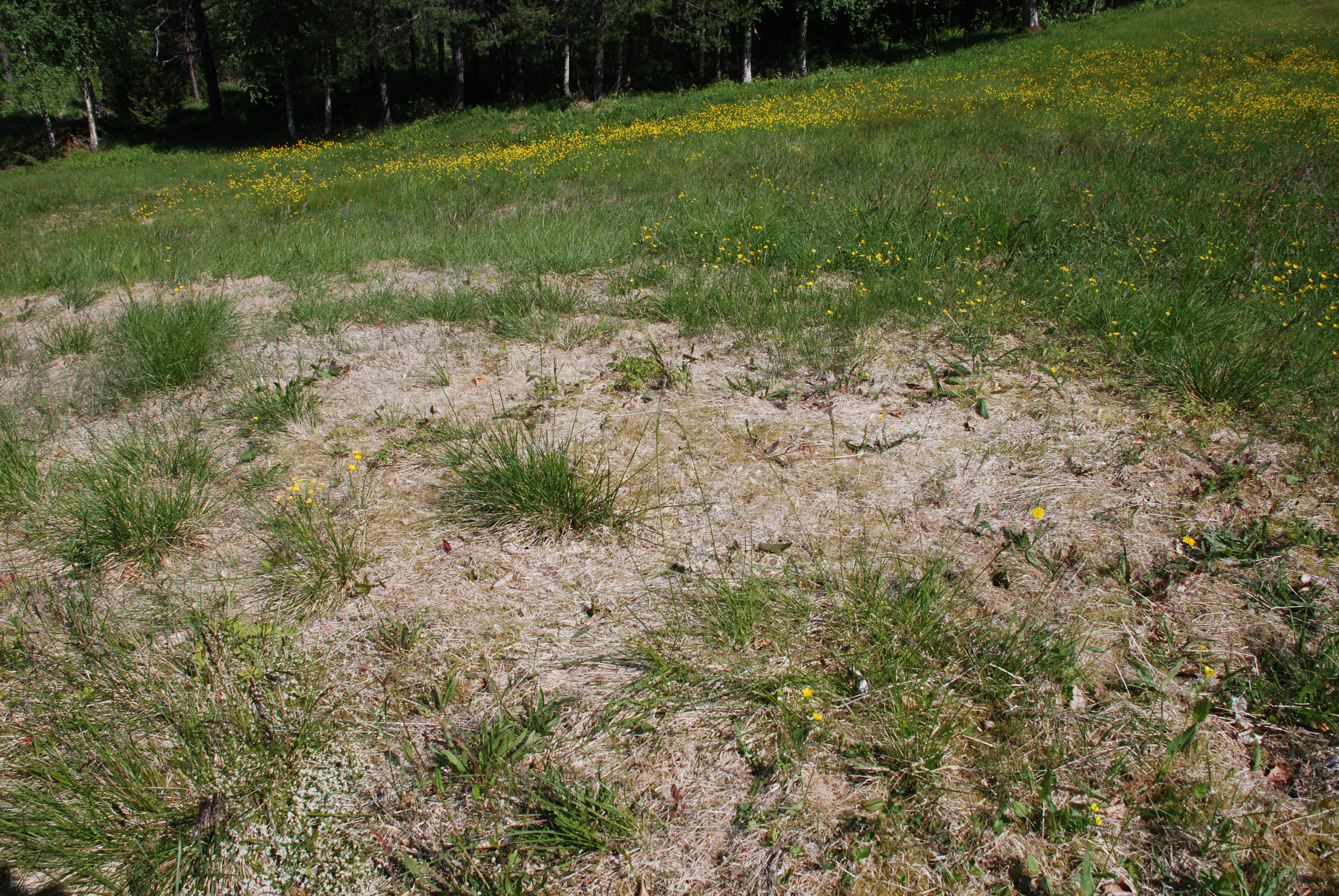
Grass attacked by snow mold

Snow mold is a type of fungus and a turf disease that damages or kills grass after snow melts, typically in late winter. Its damage is usually concentrated in circles three to twelve inches in diameter, although yards may have many of these circles, sometimes to the point at which it becomes hard to differentiate between different circles. Snow mold comes in two varieties: pink or gray. While it can affect all types of grasses, Kentucky bluegrass and fescue lawns are least affected by snow mold.

== Environment ==
Snow mold is found in areas that experience extended periods of snow cover, such as northern North America, Europe, and Asia. These areas cover the cool temperate and boreal regions of the Northern Hemisphere. Turfgrasses that are usually protected and kept moist by snow cover are endangered because of it. In overcast, rainy conditions between 32 and 60 degrees Fahrenheit, the pathogen thrives, and grows under snow covering wet turf in unfrozen soil. The pathogen “overwinters” during the summer months, in the form of sclerotia. Then, when exposed to cool temperatures and a wet environment, such as in early spring during snow melt, it forms fruiting bodies (sporocarps) or mycelium and begins to spread. The cold environment limits other biological activity, allowing Typhula spp. to thrive.

== Hosts and symptoms ==
Typhula spp. impacts cool season turfgrass that experiences extended periods of snow cover. These species of hosts can include creeping bentgrass, annual ryegrass, and perennial ryegrass. Some of its more common hosts include fine fescue, tall fescue, and Kentucky bluegrass. Symptoms of the pathogen often manifest in all species the same way; as circular patches 6 inches to a foot in diameter of dead or damaged turfgrass. Sometimes patches can be as large as three feet and can merge into other patches. These “scars” in the turf can remain until May or early June. Dead plant tissue becomes matted and blades become grayish and brittle after drying. Signs of the disease can include visible mycelium on turf after snow clears and dark brown or black sclerotia structures embedded in dead plant tissue.

== Disease cycle ==
The disease often begins its cycle in the cool, wet months of October or November. During this time, the pathogen’s primary inoculum, mycelium from sclerotia, is produced. The sclerotia (identifiable by their distinct rind patterns) begin germination under correct temperature and UV light conditions. Carpogenic sclerotia produce spore-bearing structures known as clavula, which in turn produce basidia. The resulting basidiospores produce the mycelium. The pathogen also uses the sclerotia to “overwinter” during the summer and warmer months. There is evidence that the fungus is systemic within the grass plant itself. In the spring, spores can also be spread by rain, wind, and human interaction.

== Management ==
Physically, snow mold can be managed by keeping grass cut to proper height recommendations. For bluegrasses, red fescues, and ryegrasses, this is 1 ½ - 2 inches and for bentgrasses, ½ inch or less. Mowing is recommended through autumn, until grass growth stops. Avoid thick thatch accumulation by power raking the turf frequently and avoid both synthetic and organic mulches. It may also be recommended to improve light exposure and air circulation by removing dense foliage such as trees or shrubs in the area. After snowfall, it is recommended to avoid large snow accumulation over turf, using snow fences or other barriers.

Chemically, management can include maintaining balanced fertilization. High potassium and phosphorus soil values are also recommended. Avoid nitrogen fertilization close to the first heavy snow. Common turf fungicides (including contact fungicides and systemic fungicides) should be used before the first heavy snow. Fungicides may include benzimidazole, strobilurin, and phosphonate fungicides. However, it has been found that some pink snow molds are resistant to benzimidazole fungicides.

== Gray snow mold ==
Gray snow mold (Typhula spp. or Typhula blight) is the less damaging form of snow mold. While its damage may appear widespread, it typically does little damage to the grass itself, only to the blades. Unlike most plant pathogens, it is able to survive throughout hot summer months as sclerotia under the ground or in plant debris. Typhula blight is commonly found in United States in the Great Lakes region and anywhere with cold winter temperatures and persistent snow fall.

== Pink snow mold ==
Pink snow mold (Microdochium nivale or Fusarium patch) is the more severe form of snow mold, and can destroy the roots and crowns of grass, causing more damage than gray snow mold. Like gray snow mold, it is able to survive the summer months in decayed plant debris as spores or mycelium.

== See also ==
- Phacidiaceae contains a number of snow molds found beneath the snow pack that affect young trees such as spruces.
