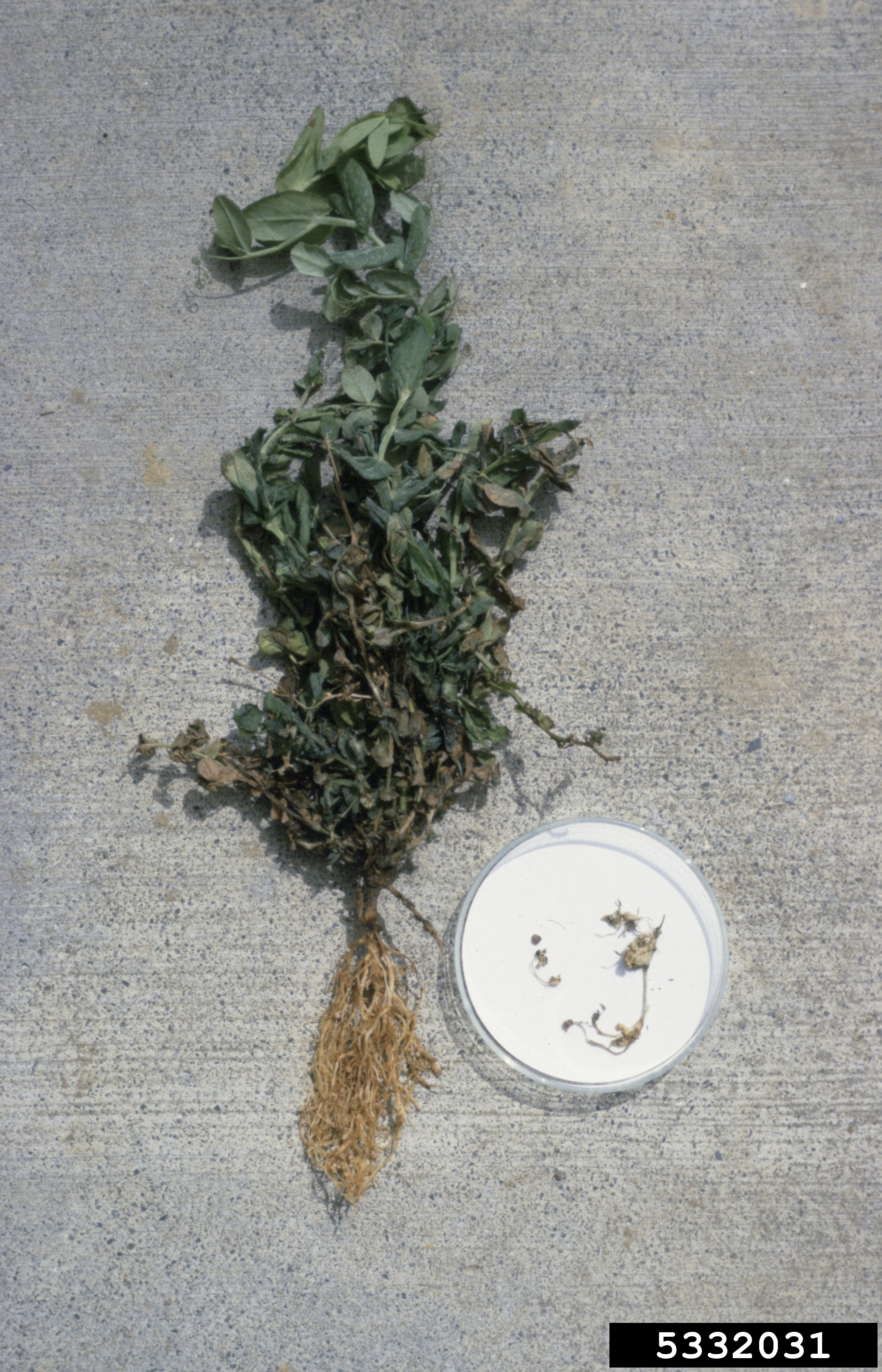

Scientific classification
- Kingdom: Fungi
- Division: Ascomycota
- Class: Leotiomycetes
- Order: Helotiales
- Family: Sclerotiniaceae
- Genus: Sclerotinia
- Species: S. trifoliorum

Binomial name
- Sclerotinia trifoliorum Erikss., (1880)

Synonyms
- Sclerotinia ciborioides Rehm; Sclerotinia trifoliorum var. trifoliorum Erikss., (1880)

= Sclerotinia trifoliorum =

Species of fungus

Sclerotinia trifoliorum is a plant pathogen infecting alfalfa, red clover, chickpea, and fava bean. Lithourgidis et al. have done much work on this disease and fava bean.
