= Colletotrichum trifolii =

Scientific classification
- Kingdom: Fungi
- Division: Ascomycota
- Class: Sordariomycetes
- Order: Glomerellales
- Family: Glomerellaceae
- Genus: Colletotrichum
- Species: C. trifolii

Binomial name
- Colletotrichum trifolii Bain, (1906)

Species of fungus

Colletotrichum trifolii is a fungal plant pathogen of alfalfa, causing the disease alfafa anthracnose. It is a biotroph, obtaining nutrients from the living plant cells before forming asexual spores. This fungus has two known races Bain and Essary.

== Hosts and symptoms ==
=== Hosts ===
Colletotrichum trifolii is a pathogen to many forage crops. These include:

- Alfalfa (most common)
- Sweet clover
- Burr clover
- Subterranean clover
- Crimson clover
- Red clover

There have been no attempts to discover a full host range outside beyond the aforementioned.

=== Symptoms ===
This pathogen causes anthracnose in these plants. The visual symptoms include:

- Scattered straw colored plants in the field
- Yellowing of leaves
- Formation of a "shepherds crook"
- Greyish brown lesions on lower stem leading to crown rot

Once parts of the plant die parts of the leaves will turn tan making the black fruiting bodies of Colletotrichum trifolii especially visible to the observer.

== Environment ==
Anthracnose from Colletotrichum trifolii most severely affects crops east of the Mississippi River and south of Wisconsin. It is also found in California and southern Arizona and in less severe cases, Colletotrichum trifolii has a moderate pressure across the whole United States except around the Rocky Mountains. It is also found in Europe, South America, and Canada. This pathogen grows the best around 25 °C. Colletotrichum trifolii also needs substantial moisture for a minimum of twelve hours to infect the plant although once infected it can survive on the plant in dry weather.

== Management ==
There are only a couple ways to manage Colletotrichum trifolii. The first way is to start scouting right away in early summer. If this pathogen is found in a field rotate crops in the field away from forage crops for at least two year. Another method of management is planting resistant varieties. It is recommended to plant only varieties with a minimum moderate resistant rating but if Colletotrichum trifolii has been a problem in the past only plant highly resistant varieties. The last management tactic is to delay planting until after Colletotrichum trifolii is normally a problem. This means waiting until late summer, around August, doing this allows the plants to become a good stand during late summer and fall while escaping most of the time when the pathogen is prevalent. This method is not very practical especially with the resistant varieties of today.
