= Phoma sclerotioides =

Scientific classification
- Kingdom: Fungi
- Division: Ascomycota
- Class: Dothideomycetes
- Order: Pleosporales
- Family: Didymellaceae
- Genus: Phoma
- Species: P. sclerotioides

Binomial name
- Phoma sclerotioides Preuss ex Sacc. (1892)

Species of fungus

Phoma sclerotioides is a plant pathogen and is the culprit for brown root rot disease in, for instance, alfalfa and clover.
