= Uromyces striatus =

Scientific classification
- Kingdom: Fungi
- Division: Basidiomycota
- Class: Pucciniomycetes
- Order: Pucciniales
- Family: Pucciniaceae
- Genus: Uromyces
- Species: U. striatus

Binomial name
- Uromyces striatus J. Schröt. (1870)

Synonyms
- List: Coeomurus striatus (J. Schröt.) Kuntze [as 'Caeomurus'], Revis. gen. pl. (Leipzig) 3(3): 450 (1898); Nigredo medicaginis (Pass.) Arthur, N. Amer. Fl. (New York) 7(3): 256 (1920); Uromyces medicaginis Pass., in Thümen, Herb. myc. oeconom., Fasc. 4: no. 156 (1874); Uromyces striatus var. medicaginis (Pass.) Arthur, Manual of the Rusts in the United States & Canada: 299 (1934)

Species of fungus

Uromyces striatus is a fungal species and plant pathogen causing rust in Medicago species.

It was originally found on the leaves of Genista tinctoria, Medicago sativa, Medicago falcata, Medicago media, Medicago lupulina, Medicago scutellata, and also Trifolium arvense in Germany.

Alfalfa (Medicago sativa) rust caused by Uromyces striatus is an important disease in many areas and is damaging to alfalfa grown for seed.
