= Phytophthora medicaginis =

Scientific classification
- Domain: Eukaryota
- Clade: Sar
- Clade: Stramenopiles
- Phylum: Oomycota
- Class: Peronosporomycetes
- Order: Peronosporales
- Family: Peronosporaceae
- Genus: Phytophthora
- Species: P. medicaginis

Binomial name
- Phytophthora medicaginis E.M. Hansen & D.P. Maxwell, (1991)

Synonyms
- Phytophthora megasperma f.sp. medicaginis T.L. Kuan & Erwin, (1980); Phytophthora sojae f.sp. medicaginis Faris

Species of single-celled organism

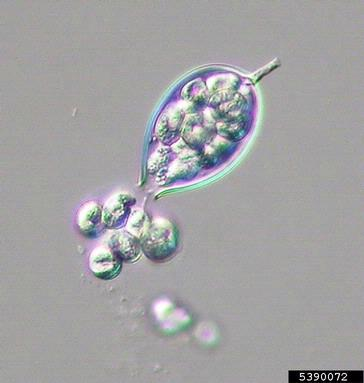
Release of zoospores from sporangium

Phytophthora medicaginis is an oomycete plant pathogen that causes root rot in alfalfa and chickpea. It is a major disease of these plants and is found wherever they are grown. P. medicaginis causes failure of stand establishment because of seedling death. Phytophthora medicaginis is part of a species complex with Phytophthora megasperma.

== Hosts and symptoms ==
Phytophthora medicaginis is a water mould pathogen that causes root rot and damping off of seedlings. P. medicaginis is specific to alfalfa and chickpea and can reside in soil or water, but since it is a water mold, it requires free water to infect another plant. This disease is most prevalent in newly seeded fields that experience flooding but can also be found in mature plants.

Phytophthora medicaginis commonly causes seedling death but if this pathogen is present in mature crops, P. medicaginis causes root rot which limits the plant's ability to acquire nutrients and water. This leads to secondary symptoms such as chlorosis, wilting, stunting, root decay, lesions and death. This disease is difficult to identify but reddish-brown or black root lesions will exist and oospores, sporangia, zoospores, antheridia, and oogonia are spore types that will be visible under a microscope. An ELISA test can confirm the presence of Phytophthora, but to confirm the species, a PCR test is effective. Several host factors will affect disease development including damage/stress to the plant and also the degree of resistance of host cultivar.

== Disease cycle ==
The disease cycle “starts” in the early spring as the oospores begin to germinate. Oospores are thick walled survival structures that allow the pathogen to survive winter. The oospores are then stimulated to germinate in the presence of free water and root exudates. Germination produces zoospores and sporangia which can then release more zoospores that infect other seeds. This is the asexual part of the cycle. This production of sporangia and zoospores happens until the end of the season when oogonia and antheridia engage in homothallic sexual reproduction to produce oospores once again. Spore types are disseminated via water such as during flooding. A cool environment also favors disease transmission.

== Management ==
An integrated disease management program incorporating host resistance with disciplined cultural, chemical, and biological methods is the best way to control P. medicaginis. The first several weeks are especially critical in the management of P. medicaginis as infected seeds die in a short amount of time. Control of alfalfa and chickpea is mostly possible using effective water management, use of resistant cultivars, proper crop rotation, and seed application of fungicides such as metalaxyl. Effective water management is aimed at keeping the plants as dry as possible while still getting them enough water. Several ways to do this include assuring good drainage, avoiding excessive irrigation, and allowing plants to be dried by the wind. Oospores can be spread by way of cultural practices on machinery, boots, and hooves. This spread can be limited by using proper sanitation before moving from an infected field to a disease free field. All of these control methods are aimed at stopping the initial infection of the seed/plant; water management also functions to limit the spread of zoospores because they may be spread by floods. Stopping the initial infection is important because this disease affects plants early on in their development as it quickly causes root rot and damping off. P. medicaginis can reside in fields as oospores for up to 3.5 years so the crop rotation must be at least 3 years long.
