= Leptosphaeria pratensis =

Scientific classification
- Kingdom: Fungi
- Division: Ascomycota
- Class: Dothideomycetes
- Order: Pleosporales
- Family: Leptosphaeriaceae
- Genus: Leptosphaeria
- Species: L. pratensis

Binomial name
- Leptosphaeria pratensis Sacc. & Briard, (1885)

Synonyms
- Ascochyta compta Phloeospora trifolii Phoma meliloti Septogloeum medicaginis Septoria compta Septoria medicaginis Stagonospora compta Stagonospora medicaginis Stagonospora trifolii

Species of fungus

Leptosphaeria pratensis is a plant pathogen. It causes stagonospora root rot.
