= Nectria ramulariae =

Scientific classification
- Kingdom: Fungi
- Division: Ascomycota
- Class: Sordariomycetes
- Order: Hypocreales
- Family: Nectriaceae
- Genus: Nectria
- Species: N. ramulariae

Binomial name
- Nectria ramulariae (Wollenw.) E. Müll., (1962)

Synonyms
- Cylindrocarpon ehrenbergii Wollenw., (1926); Fusarium candidum Ehrenb., (1818); Neonectria ramulariae Wollenw., (1917); Ramularia candida (Ehrenb.) Wollenw.

Species of fungus

Nectria ramulariae is a plant pathogenic fungus.
