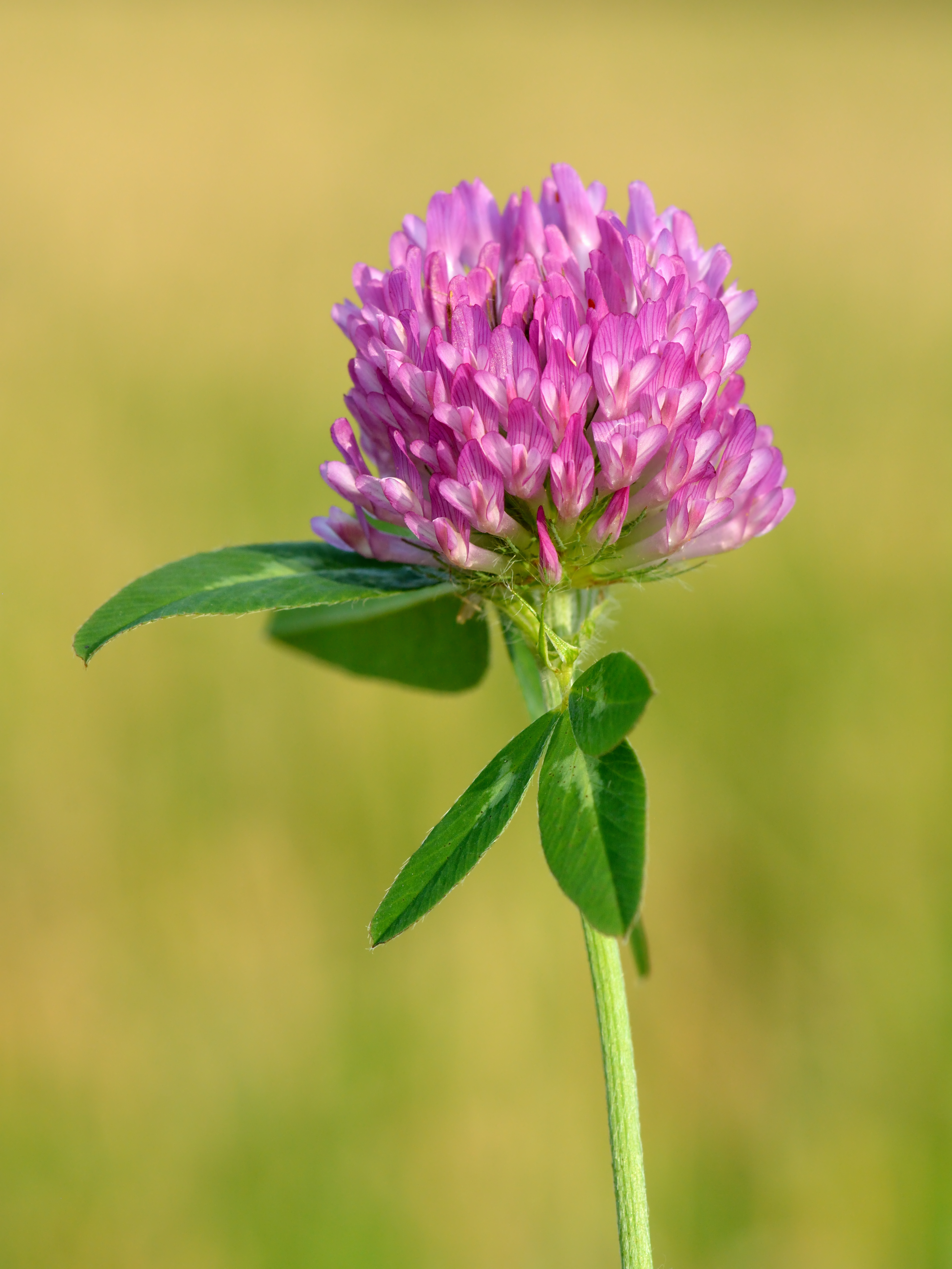

Conservation status
- Least Concern (IUCN 3.1)

Scientific classification
- Kingdom: Plantae
- Clade: Embryophytes
- Clade: Tracheophytes
- Clade: Angiosperms
- Clade: Eudicots
- Clade: Rosids
- Order: Fabales
- Family: Fabaceae
- Subfamily: Faboideae
- Genus: Trifolium
- Species: T. pratense

Binomial name
- Trifolium pratense L.

Synonyms
- Lagopus pratensis (L.) Bernh.; Trifolium pratense f. pratense; Trifolium pratense var. pratense; Trifolium ukrainicum Opperman

= Trifolium pratense =

Species of flowering plant in the bean family

Trifolium pratense (from Latin prātum, meaning meadow), red clover, is a herbaceous species of flowering plant in the bean family, Fabaceae. It is native to the Old World, but planted and naturalised in many other regions.

== Description ==
The red clover is a herbaceous, short-lived perennial plant, which is generally variable in size, growing to 20–80 cm (8–31 in) tall. It has a deep taproot which makes it tolerant to drought and gives it a good soil structuring effect. The leaves are alternate, trifoliate (with three leaflets), each leaflet 15–30 mm (5/8–1 1/8 in) long and 8–15 mm (3/8–5/8 in) broad, green with a characteristic pale crescent in the outer half of the leaf. The petiole is 1–4 cm (1/2–1 1/2 in) long, with two basal stipules that are abruptly narrowed to a bristle-like point. The flowers are dark pink with a paler base, 12–15 mm (1/2–5/8 in) long, produced in a dense inflorescence. In individual flowers, sepals are fused from the base into a hairy calyx tube with 5 teeth. The typical family 5 petals (standard, 2 wings and 2 keel) are also joined together at the base, and are up to 3 times longer than the calyx. The upper of the 10 stamens is free, with the filaments of the 9 other joined into a tube surrounding the style. They are mostly visited by bumblebees. Cultivated varieties are substantially larger than the wild plants.

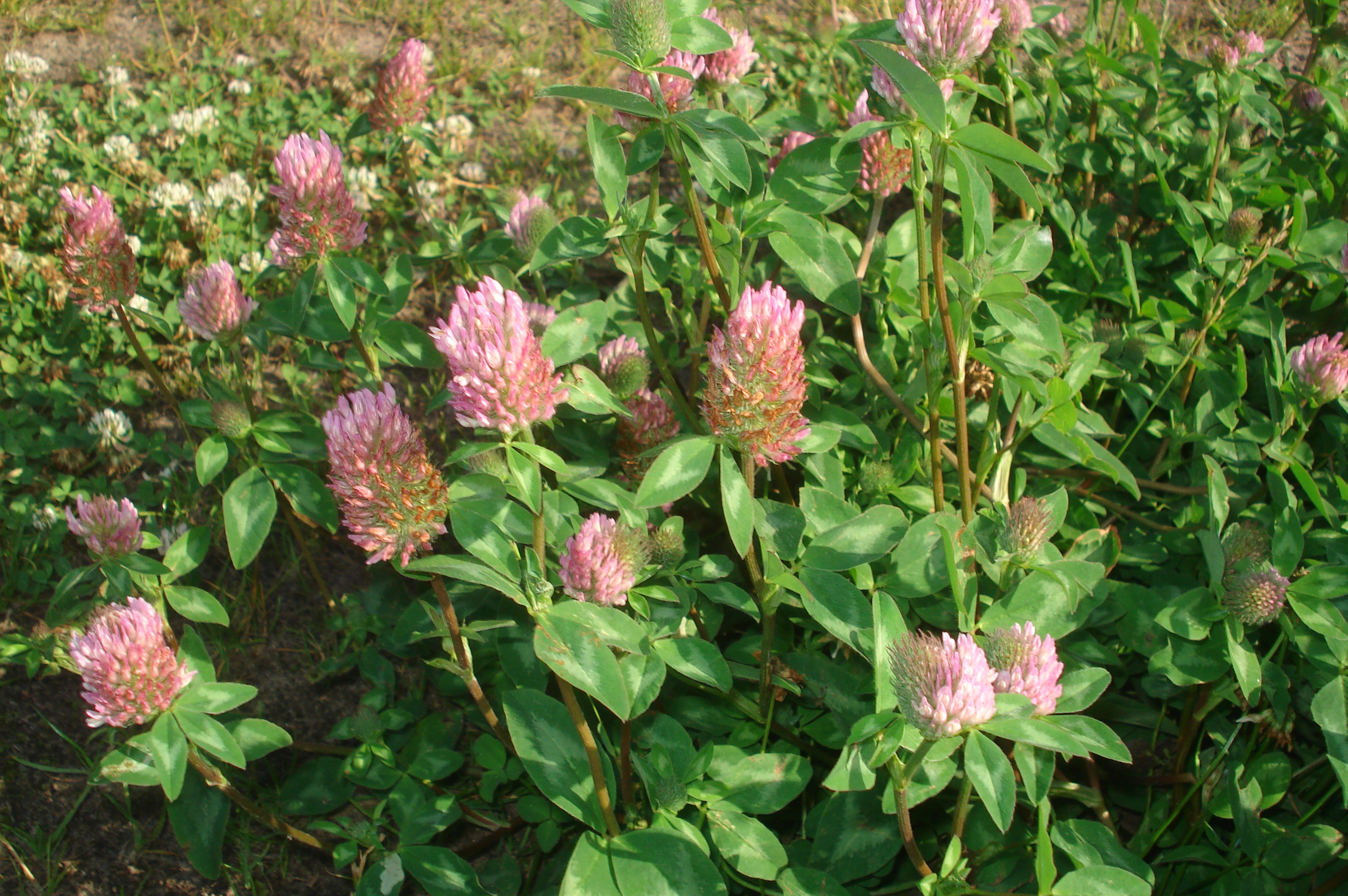
Latvian specimen

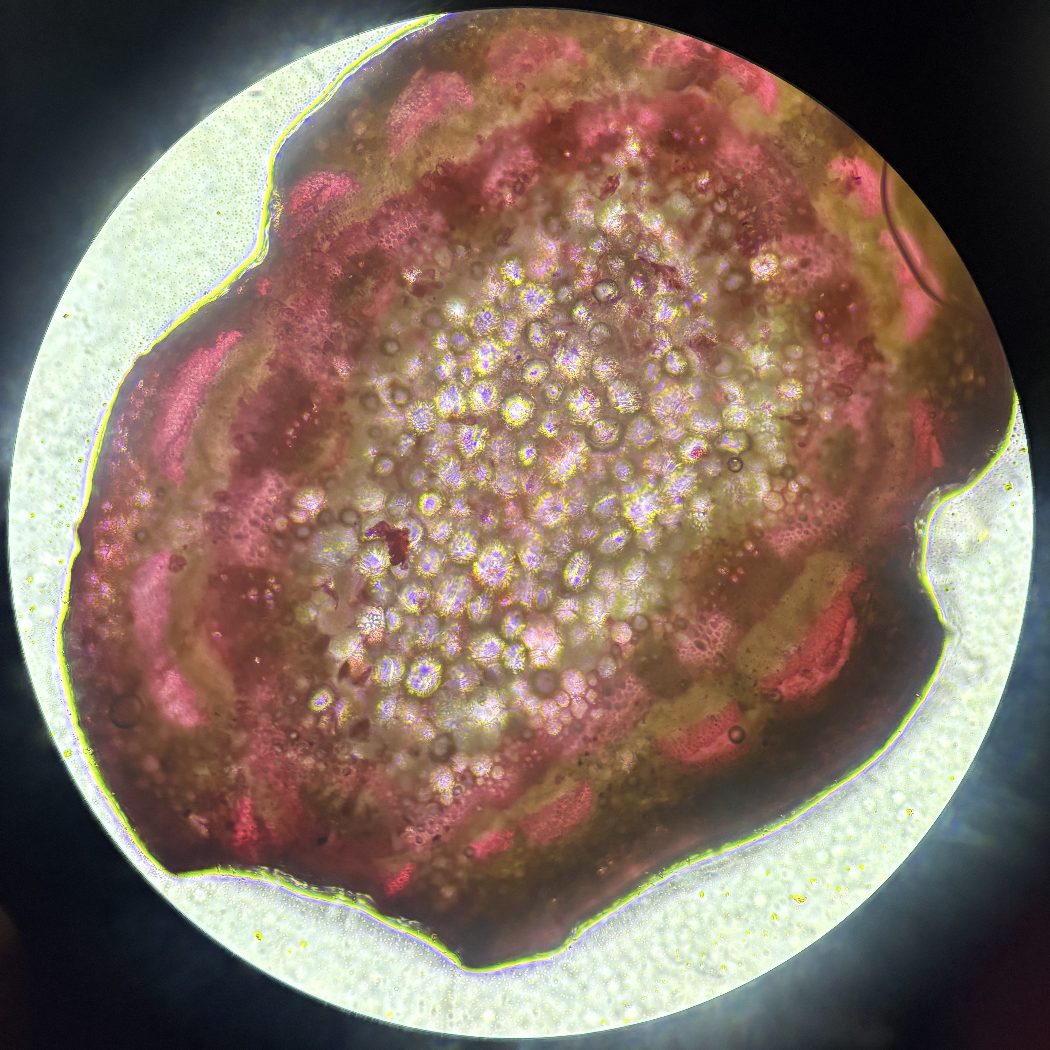
Stem cross section

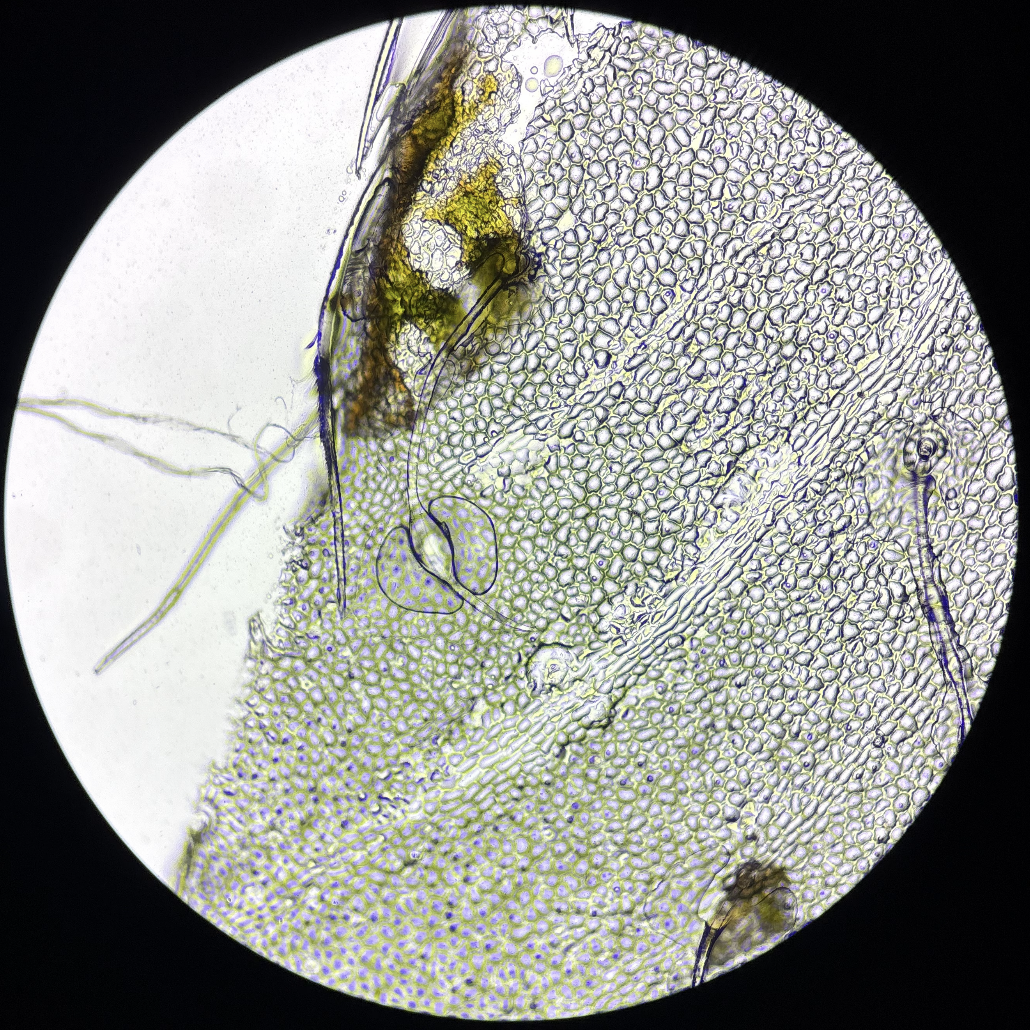
Leaf skin peel

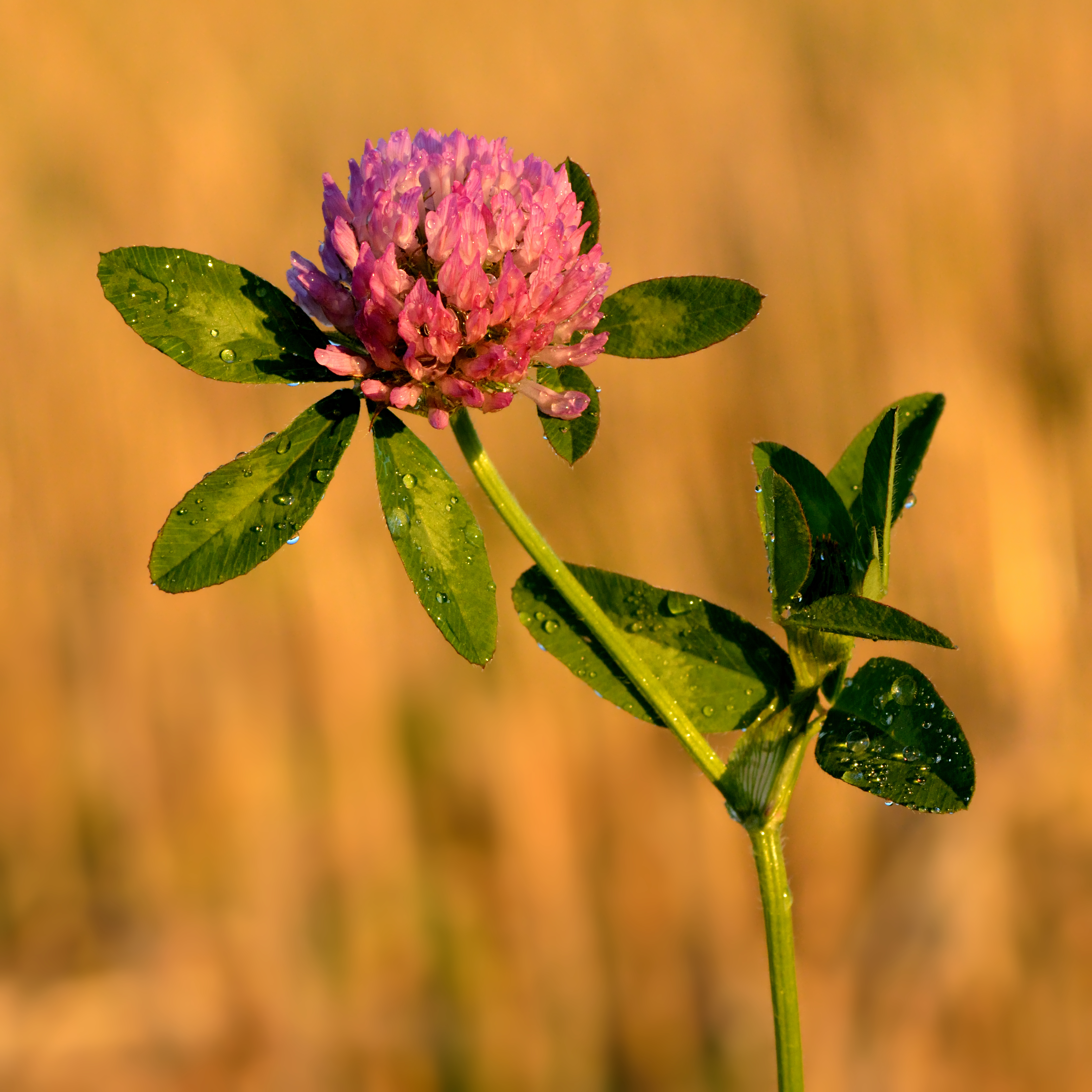
Flower

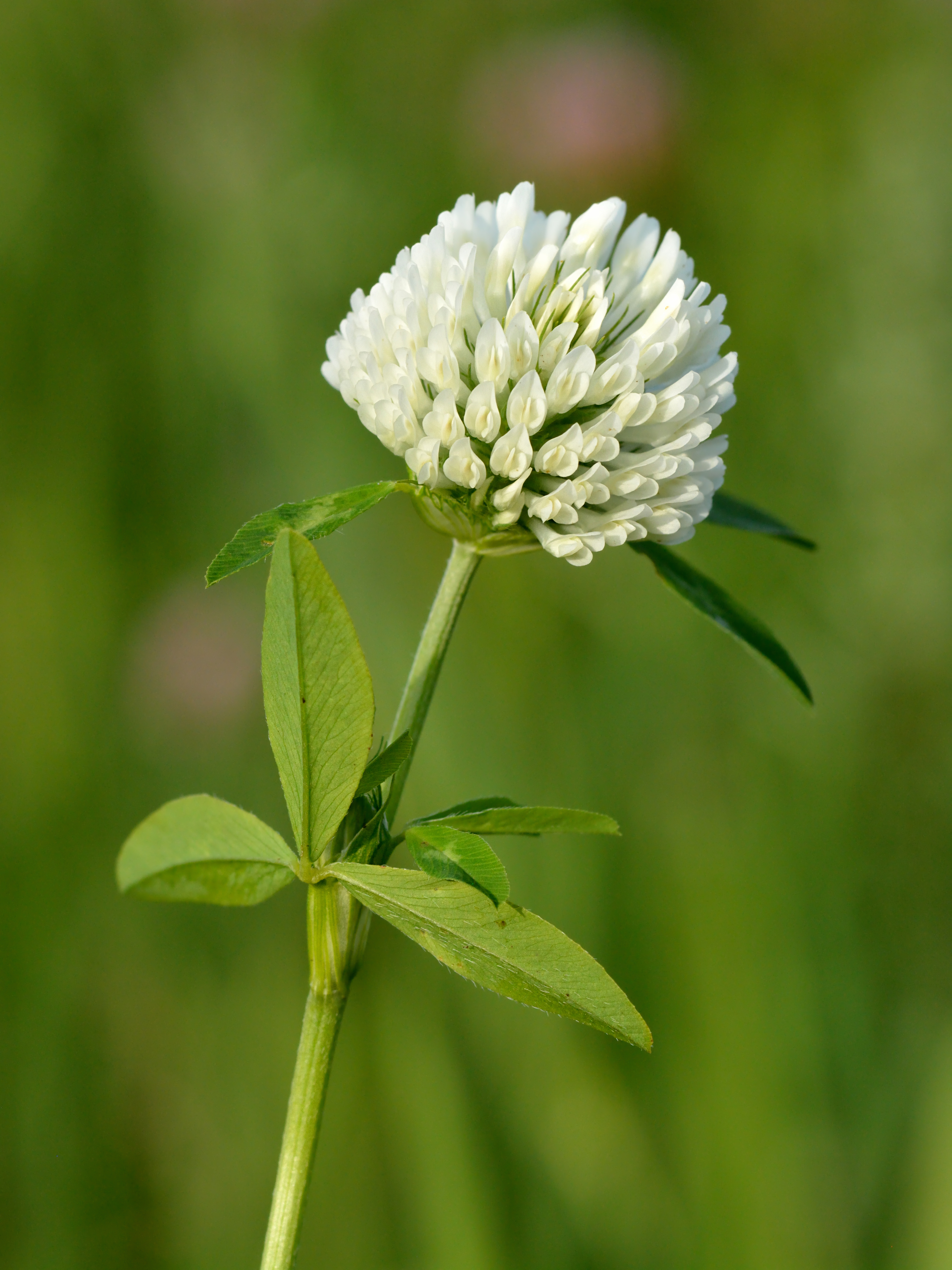
White-flowered form

== Taxonomy ==
Trifolium pratense was initially published by Carl Linnaeus in his book Species Plantarum (1753). The genus has 3 known subspecies:

- Trifolium pratense subsp. baeticum (Boiss.) Vicioso
- Trifolium pratense subsp. kotulae (Pawl.) Soják
- Trifolium pratense subsp. pratense

== Distribution ==
The red clover is native to Europe, Western Asia, and northwest Africa, but it has been naturalised in other continents, like North and South America. Specifically, the red clover was brought to Argentina and Chile over 100 years ago, although it is not clear how exactly it was introduced. Additionally, it has been introduced to New Zealand.

== Ecology ==
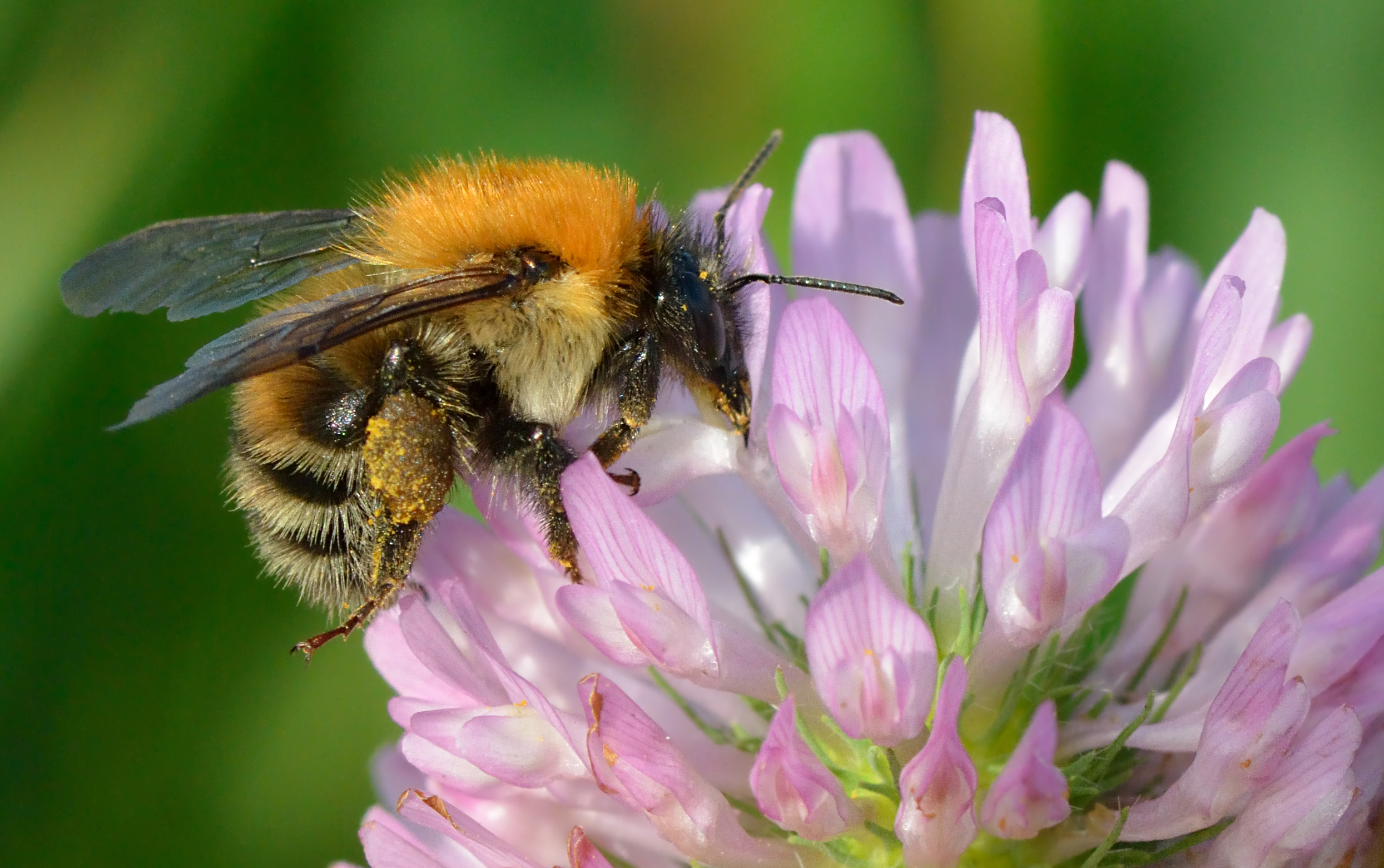
Red clover is a good pollen and nectar source for bumblebees

One important pollinator, which was also brought from Europe, is Bombus ruderatus, or the large garden bumblebee. This bumblebee has been one of the important pollinators of red clover in South America and New Zealand. Red clover is subject to bacterial as well as fungal diseases, including clover rot, and red clover rust, Uromyces trifolii-repentis var. fallens. Other problems include parasitic nematodes (roundworms) and viruses. Trifolium pratense's perennial nature affords sustained, reliable growth. Furthermore, the species' ability to fix nitrogen promotes protein rich growth, supporting a wide range of wildlife including deer, turkeys, and rabbits.

== Uses ==
It is widely grown as a fodder crop, valued for its nitrogen fixation, which increases soil fertility. For these reasons, it is used as a green manure crop. Several cultivar groups have been selected for agricultural use, mostly derived from T. pratense var. sativum. It has become naturalised in many temperate areas, including the Americas and Australasia as an escape from cultivation. The red clover has become increasingly important as a source of economic stability in Chile, which has made the need for pollinators even more important. In India the highest producer of red clover seed is the Agriculture Department of Kashmir's Fodder Seed Production Station Aru. Two red clover accessions were deposited in the National Gene Bank of India in 2019 by the Indian Council of Agricultural Research. It is also grown as an ornamental plant. Red clover's flowers and leaves are edible, and can be added as garnishes to any dish. They can be ground into a flour. The flowers often are used to make jelly and tisanes, and are used in essiac recipes. Their essential oil may be extracted and its unique scent used in aromatherapy. The pink flowers afford high visibility levels and facilitate such attraction and may be used by wildlife remediation teams and conservationists seeking to build wildlife bridges to connect fragmented habitats.

=== Cosmetics ===
Extracts of red clover are used as cosmetic ingredients, and a number of preparations of the plant are listed under INCI names in the European Commission's CosIng database of cosmetic ingredients. Trifolium Pratense Flower Extract (CosIng ref. 59842) is recorded with the functions astringent and fragrance, and Trifolium Pratense Leaf Extract (ref. 59840) as antioxidant and skin conditioning. Neither entry records any provision under the Cosmetics Regulation or other restriction. CosIng is a non-binding informational database, and inclusion in it does not constitute approval for use in cosmetic products; the regulatory status of a cosmetic ingredient in the European Union is determined by Regulation (EC) No 1223/2009 and its annexes.

=== Folk medicine ===
There is no good evidence red clover extracts are of any benefit for preventing or treating cancer or any other diseases. In alternative medicine, red clover is promoted as a treatment for various disorders, having some evidence it may reduce the frequency of hot flashes in menopausal women. Clinical organizations do not recommend use of red clover for treatment of menopause symptoms.

Systematic reviews specific to red clover have reported modest effects on hot flush frequency. A 2021 meta-analysis of eight randomised trials found a reduction of 1.73 hot flushes per day relative to placebo. A 2026 meta-analysis reported a small-to-moderate reduction in hot flush frequency. A 2013 Cochrane review of phytoestrogens found no difference between red clover extract and placebo in daily hot flush frequency.

A 2015 assessment by the European Food Safety Authority of food supplements containing isolated isoflavones, which included red clover isoflavones at the doses typically marketed to peri- and post-menopausal women, found no indication of adverse effects on the mammary gland, uterus or thyroid gland in post-menopausal women at the doses and durations studied.

In the United States, clover (Trifolium spp.) is listed as generally recognized as safe for use as a spice or natural seasoning and flavoring; this listing does not extend to isoflavone supplement preparations. The Food and Drug Administration has issued warning letters treating red clover products marketed with disease claims as unapproved new drugs.

=== Phytochemistry ===
Phytochemicals in red clover include carbohydrates, isoflavones and other flavonoids, and saponins. Isoflavones, also called phytoestrogens, have structural similarity to estrogens. The principal isoflavones are formononetin, biochanin A, daidzein and genistein.

Isoflavone content varies markedly with plant part, phenological stage, cultivar and post-harvest processing. Coumaric acid is a red clover component; due to its coumarin and flavonoid derivatives, T. pratense should be used with caution in individuals having coagulation disorders or prescribed with anticoagulation therapy.

== In culture ==
The red clover became the state flower of Vermont in 1894. It has also been used as the national flower of Denmark. In 1936 the Ministry of Foreign Affairs announced it was the national flower as part of an international exhibition taking place in Argentina. However, the choice did not become popular with the public. In 1987 the daisy, specifically either the marguerite daisy (Argyranthemum frutescens) or oxeye daisy (Leucanthemum vulgare), replaced it as the nation's floral emblem.

== See also ==
- Green manure
- List of ineffective cancer treatments
