= List of tomato diseases =

This article is a list of diseases of tomatoes (Solanum lycopersicum).

== Bacterial diseases ==
Bacterial diseases (including phytoplasma)
Bacterial Canker of Tomato	Clavibacter michiganensis subsp. michiganensis
Bacterial speck	Pseudomonas syringae pv. tomato
Bacterial spot	Xanthomonas campestris pv. vesicatoria
Bacterial stem rot and fruit rot	Erwinia carotovora subsp. carotovora
Bacterial wilt	Ralstonia solanacearum
Pith necrosis	Pseudomonas corrugata
Syringae leaf spot	Pseudomonas syringae pv. syringae
Aster yellows	Ca. Phytoplasma asteris
Tomato big bud	Ca. Phytoplasma sp.; may be multiple agents

== Fungal diseases ==
Fungal diseases
Alternaria stem canker	Alternaria alternata f.sp. lycopersici
Anthracnose	Colletotrichum coccodes; Colletotrichum dematium; Colletotrichum gloeosporioides; Glomerella cingulata [teleomorph]
Black mold rot	Alternaria alternata; Stemphylium botryosum; Pleospora tarda [teleomorph]; Stemphylium herbarum; Pleospora herbarum [teleomorph]; Pleospora lycopersici; Ulocladium consortiale; Stemphylium consortiale
Black root rot	Thielaviopsis basicola; Chalara elegans [synanamorph]
Black shoulder	Alternaria alternata
Buckeye rot of tomato	Phytophthora capsici; Phytophthora drechsleri; Phytophthora nicotianae var. parasitica; Phytophthora parasitica
Cercospora leaf mold	Pseudocercospora fuligena; Cercospora fuligena
Charcoal rot	Macrophomina phaseolina
Corky root rot	Pyrenochaeta lycopersici
Didymella stem rot	Didymella lycopersici
Early blight	Alternaria solani
Fusarium crown and root rot	Fusarium oxysporum f.sp. radicis-lycopersici
Fusarium wilt	Fusarium oxysporum f.sp. lycopersici
Gray Leaf Spot	Stemphylium botryosum f.sp. lycopersici; Stemphylium lycopersici; Stemphylium floridanum; Stemphylium solani
Gray mold	Botrytis cinerea; Botryotinia fuckeliana [teleomorph]
Late blight	Phytophthora infestans
Leaf mold	Fulvia fulva; Cladosporium fulvum
Phoma rot	Phoma destructiva
Powdery mildew	Oidiopsis sicula; Leveillula taurica [teleomorph]
Pythium damping-off and fruit rot	Pythium aphanidermatum; Pythium arrhenomanes; Pythium debaryanum; Pythium myriotylum; Pythium ultimum
Rhizoctonia damping-off and fruit rot	Rhizoctonia solani; Thanatephorus cucumeris [teleomorph]
Rhizopus rot	Rhizopus stolonifer
Septoria leaf spot	Septoria lycopersici
Sour rot	Geotrichum candidum; Galactomyces geotrichum [teleomorph]; Geotrichum klebahnii (= G. penicillatum)
Southern Blight	Sclerotium rolfsii; Athelia rolfsii [teleomorph]
Target spot	Corynespora cassiicola
Verticillium wilt	Verticillium albo-atrum; Verticillium dahliae
White mold	Sclerotinia sclerotiorum; Sclerotinia minor

== Lepidoptera larvae ==
Lepidoptera larvae
Cutworm	Noctua pronuba and other Noctuidae
tomato fruitworm	Helicoverpa zea
Tomato hornworm	Manduca quinquemaculata
Tobacco hornworm	Manduca sexta
	Leucinodes africensis
Brown-tipped pearl	Leucinodes laisalis
Eggplant borer	Leucinodes orbonalis
	Lineodes integra
Tomato fruit borer	Neoleucinodes elegantalis
Eggplant leafroller	Rhectocraspeda periusalis
Potato tuber moth	Phthorimaea operculella
Tomato borer	Tuta absoluta
Tomato pinworm	Keiferia lycopersicella

== Nematodes ==
Nematodes, parasitic
Root-knot	Meloidogyne spp.
Sting	Belonolaimus longicaudatus
Stubby-root	Paratrichodorus spp.; Trichodorus spp.

== Viral and viroid ==
Viral and viroid diseases
Common mosaic of tomato (internal browning of fruit)	Tobacco mosaic virus (TMV)
Curly top	Curtovirus
Potato virus Y	Potato virus Y
Pseudo curly top	Tomato pseudo-curly top virus
Tomato bushy stunt	Tomato bushy stunt virus
Tomato etch	Tobacco etch virus
Tomato fern leaf	Cucumber mosaic virus
Tomato mosaic	Tomato mosaic virus (ToMV)
Tomato mottle	Tomato mottle geminivirus
Tomato necrosis	Alfalfa mosaic virus
Tomato spotted wilt	Tomato spotted wilt virus
Tomato yellow leaf curl	Tomato yellow leaf curl virus
Tomato yellow top	Tomato yellow top virus
Tomato bunchy top	Potato spindle tuber viroid
Tomato planto macho	Tomato planto macho viroid

== Miscellaneous diseases and disorders ==
Miscellaneous diseases and disorders
Autogenous necrosis	Genetic
Fruit pox	Genetic
Gold fleck	Genetic
Graywall	Undetermined etiology
