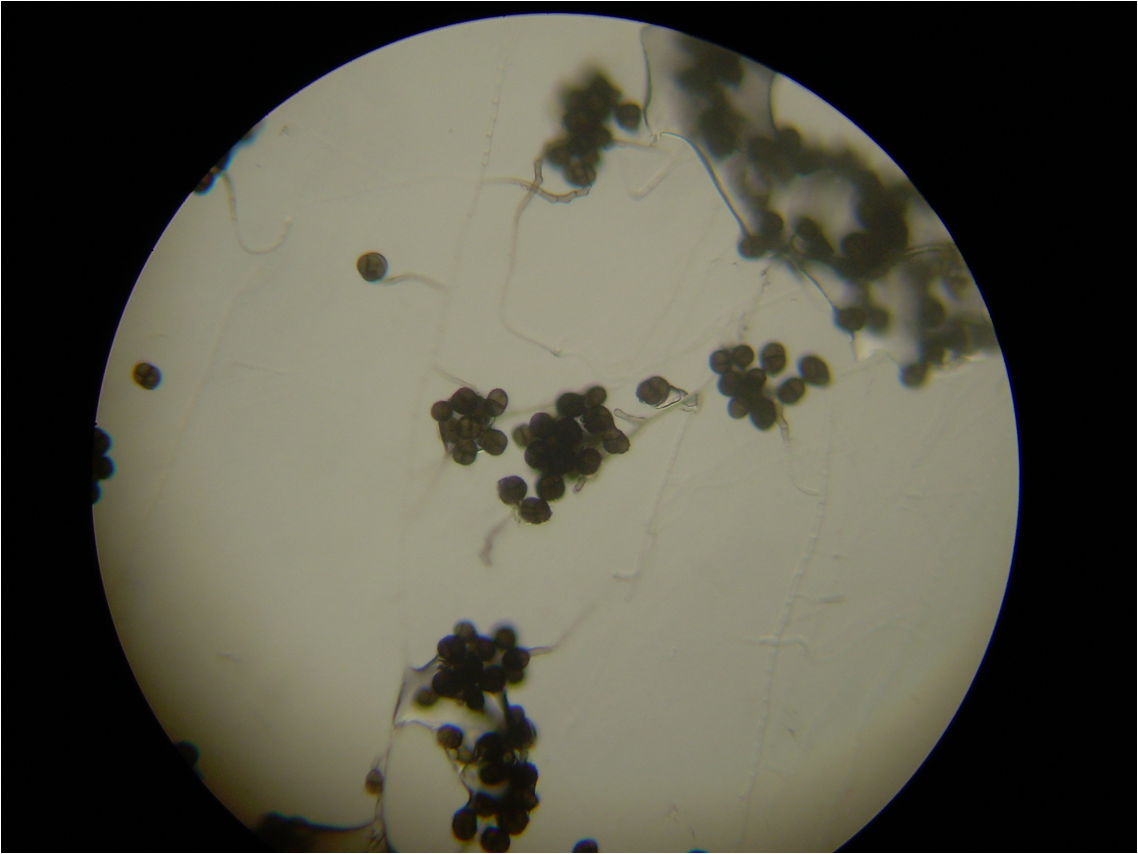
- Ulocladium sp. conidiophores

Scientific classification
- Kingdom: Fungi
- Division: Ascomycota
- Class: Dothideomycetes
- Order: Pleosporales
- Family: Pleosporaceae
- Genus: Ulocladium; Preuss (1851)

Type species
- Ulocladium botrytis Preuss (1851)

= Ulocladium =

Genus of fungi

Ulocladium is a genus of fungi. Species of this genus contain both plant pathogens and food spoilage agents. Other species contain enzymes that are biological control agents. Some members of the genus can invade homes and are a sign of moisture because the mold requires water to thrive. They can cause plant diseases or hay fever and more serious infections in immuno-suppressed individuals.

Species of Ulocladium resemble those of genus Alternaria with which they were once included. Several DNA-based phylogenetic studies place Ulocladium convincingly within Alternaria, suggesting that the latter is the correct classification for these species. However, Ulocladium, unlike Alternaria, do not produce alternariols, tenuazonic acid, altersolanols, or macrosporin.

The species Ulocladium oudemansii is utilised as a biocontrol agent against Botrytis cinerea. The New Zealand company Botryzen (2010) Ltd uses it to control Botrytis bunch rot in the NZ grape industry; Sclerotinia and Psa in the NZ kiwfruit industry.

== Conidia ==
Conidia are black, rough, with pointed base when young, with both transverse and longitudinal septae, single or in a short chain (only in U. chartarum). Conidiophores are pale brown, erect, multicelled, and develop conidia in a sympodial mode. The two common species of indoor Ulocladium are U. botrytis and U. chartarum. This genus is closely related to Alternaria and Stemphyllium. Ulocladium conidia are characteristic and can be identified by properly trained laboratory analysts, although spores of Alternaria and Pithomyces may be confused with Ulocladium.

== Species (approximately 20) ==
- Ulocladium alternariae (Cooke) Simmons, fungal agent of pistachio
- Ulocladium atrum, biocontrol of Botrytis cinerea
- Ulocladium botrytis Preuss, claimed not a pathogen, but found to cause onychomycosis
- Ulocladium chartarum (G Preuss) EG Simmons, disease in immuno-suppressed patients
- Ulocladium chlamydosporum
- Ulocladium consortiale, plant pathogen of caraway
- Ulocladium cucurbitae (Letendre & Roum.) EG Simmons, leaf spot pathogen of cucumber
- Ulocladium dauci EG Simmons
- Ulocladium lanuginosum(Harz) EG Simmons
- Ulocladium litoreum Pivkin & Zvereva
- Ulocladium manihoticola JM Yen
- Ulocladium manihoticolum JM Yen
- Ulocladium microspora Moub & Abdel-Hafez
- Ulocladium multiforme EG Simmons
- Ulocladium oblongo-ovoideum XG Zhang & TY Zhang
- Ulocladium ovoideum EG Simmons
- Ulocladium oudemansii EG Simmons, biocontrol of Botrytis cinerea
- Ulocladium populi E.G. Simmons, G. Newcombe & A. Shipunov
- Ulocladium septosporum (Preuss) EG Simmons
- Ulocladium tuberculatum EG Simmons
