= List of Pleospora species =

This is a list of the fungus species in the genus Pleospora. Many are plant pathogens. As of 8 August 2023, the GBIF lists up to 440 species, while Species Fungorum lists about 375 species. This list uses the Species Fungorum list.

== A ==
- Pleospora abscondita Sacc. & Roum. (1881)
- Pleospora acaenae Henn. (1906)
- Pleospora aceris-tatarici Sandu (1962)
- Pleospora aclypeata Jadhav, Somani & Wangikar (1978)
- Pleospora addubitans (Stirt.) A.L. Sm. (1926)
- Pleospora adenophorae Gucevič (1972)
- Pleospora adminae Rieuf (1962)
- Pleospora aeluropodis Lobik (1928)
- Pleospora agapanthi Cruchet (1923)
- Pleospora agavicola Sivan. (1984)
- Pleospora aggregata Wehm. & S. Ahmad (1964)
- Pleospora akolae Jadhav, Somani & Wangikar (1978)
- Pleospora alismatis Ellis & Everh. (1902)
- Pleospora alnea Kauffman (1929)
- Pleospora alnicola Podl. & Svrček (1970)
- Pleospora alsines Hollós (1906)
- Pleospora alstroemeriae Speg. (1910)
- Pleospora altajensis Petr. (1928)
- Pleospora alternariae Gibelli & Griffiths (1873)
- Pleospora ambigua (Berl. & Bres.) Wehm. (1951)
- Pleospora amelanchieris Wehm. (1946)
- Pleospora amphoricarpi (Bubák) Wehm. (1961)
- Pleospora androsaces Fuckel (1875)
- Pleospora angustata Wehm. (1951)
- Pleospora angustis Gruyter & Verkley (2012)
- Pleospora anthyllidis Auersw. & Niessl (1876)
- Pleospora aphyllanthis Henn. (1902)
- Pleospora aquatica Griffiths (1899)
- Pleospora aradensis N. Petrescu (1942)
- Pleospora armeniacae McAlpine (1902)
- Pleospora arundinis Mariani (1911)
- Pleospora arxii Tilak (1960)
- Pleospora ascodedicata L. Holm & Nograsek (1990)
- Pleospora asplenii Ziling (1929)
- Pleospora asymmetrica Wehm. (1951)
- Pleospora atromaculans Rehm (1904)
- Pleospora aurangabadensis Tilak & R.L. Kulk. (1974)
- Pleospora aurea Ellis & Everh. (1883)
- Pleospora aureliana Fairm. (1906)
- Pleospora avenae Rathschlag (1930)

== B ==
- Pleospora baldensis Crivelli (1983)
- Pleospora baldingerae Petr. (1924)
- Pleospora baldratiana Bacc. (1917)
- Pleospora balsamorrhizae Tracy & Earle (1901)
- Pleospora bardanae Niessl (1876)
- Pleospora bataanensis Petr. (1923)
- Pleospora batumensis Naumov (1912)
- Pleospora berberidicola Lobik (1928)
- Pleospora berlesii Oudem. (1897)
- Pleospora bernadetiae van den Boom (2014)
- Pleospora biebersteinii Gucevič (1972)
- Pleospora billbergiae Verwoerd & Du Plessis (1931)
- Pleospora bobanensis Bubák (1915)
- Pleospora boldoae Speg. (1910)
- Pleospora borgiana (Sacc.) Theiss. (1917)
- Pleospora brachyspora (Niessl) Petr. (1940)
- Pleospora briosiana Maffei (1916)
- Pleospora bryophila Racov. (1959)
- Pleospora bubakiana Jaap (1916)
- Pleospora buddlejae Gucevič (1959)
- Pleospora buddlejicola Gucevič (1959)
- Pleospora bulgarica Petr. (1931)

== C ==
- Pleospora caesalpiniae Gucevič (1960)
- Pleospora camelliae Dippen. (1931)
- Pleospora canariensis Speg. (1914)
- Pleospora caricis-pendulae Unamuno (1929)
- Pleospora carphicola Speg. (1924)
- Pleospora caudata (Rehm) E. Müll. (1951)
- Pleospora ceanothi (Dearn. & House) Dearn. (1926)
- Pleospora celtidicola Gucevič (1959)
- Pleospora centaureae Politis (1940)
- Pleospora cephalandrae E. Müll. & S. Ahmad (1957)
- Pleospora cerasi Politis (1938)
- Pleospora cereicola Speg. (1910)
- Pleospora chlorogali Fairm. (1923)
- Pleospora chuquiragae Speg. (1909)
- Pleospora clavata Gucevič (1970)
- Pleospora clavispora Wehm. (1953)
- Pleospora clementsii Wehm. (1953)
- Pleospora clypeata Wehm. (1949)
- Pleospora collaltina Sacc. & Speg. (1878)
- Pleospora collapsa Feltgen (1903)
- Pleospora colobanthi Henn. (1906)
- Pleospora coluteae (Goid.) Wehm. (1961)
- Pleospora coluteicola Gonz. Frag. ex Trotter (1928)
- Pleospora comata Niessl (1872)
- Pleospora compositarum Earle (1901)
- Pleospora coronillae Severini (1913)
- Pleospora crozalsii Vouaux (1913)
- Pleospora culmicola Speg. (1910)
- Pleospora culmigena Feltgen (1901)
- Pleospora curvasca Bubák (1914)
- Pleospora cytisella Lobik (1928)
- Pleospora cytisi Fuckel (1870)
- Pleospora cytisicola Lobik (1928)

== D ==
- Pleospora dakotensis (Rehm) Petr. (1952)
- Pleospora dalbergiae A.K. Pande (1970)
- Pleospora davatchii Esfand. (1950)
- Pleospora dearnessii Sacc. (1914)
- Pleospora deceptiva Wehm. (1961)
- Pleospora denudata Feltgen (1903)
- Pleospora dianthi Rabenh. (1862)
- Pleospora dichondrae Frisullo & U. Braun (1996)
- Pleospora dichromotricha (Speg.) Wehm. (1953)
- Pleospora discoidea Feltgen (1903)
- Pleospora discors (Durieu & Mont.) Ces. & De Not. (1863)
- Pleospora dissiliens Magnus (1900)
- Pleospora doidgeae Petr. (1927)
- Pleospora donacina (Fr.) Niessl (1876)
- Pleospora drummondii Nirenberg & Plate (1983)
- Pleospora drygalskiana Henn. (1906)
- Pleospora dusenii Petr. (1947)
- Pleospora dyeri Doidge (1948)

== E ==
- Pleospora echiicola Petr. (1924)
- Pleospora echinophorae Kuhnh.-Lord. & J.P. Barry (1949)
- Pleospora edwiniae Clem. (1903)
- Pleospora egyptiaca Reichert (1921)
- Pleospora elaeagni Tilak & R. Rao (1968)
- Pleospora elegans Gucevič (1971)
- Pleospora eleocharidis P. Karst. (1873)
- Pleospora ellisii Wehm. (1961)
- Pleospora eocoronis Clem. ex Wehm. (1961)
- Pleospora ephedricola Speg. (1912)
- Pleospora epilobii E. Müll. (1951)
- Pleospora episphaeria Teng & S.H. Ou (1936)
- Pleospora equiseti A.L. Sm. (1908)
- Pleospora eremosparti Szembel (1924)
- Pleospora eriobotryae Cristofol. (1913)
- Pleospora eryngii Politis (1940)
- Pleospora escalerae Gonz. Frag. (1918)
- Pleospora escaleriana Gonz. Frag. (1918)
- Pleospora eturmiuna E.G. Simmons (2001)
- Pleospora eucalypti J.L. Mulder (1989)
- Pleospora euonymella Maubl. (1903)
- Pleospora eustegia (Cooke) Sacc. (1883)
- Pleospora excelsa Gonz. Frag. (1923)

== F ==
- Pleospora fagi Lind (1907)
- Pleospora faidherbiae Faurel & Schotter (1958)
- Pleospora falconeri Henn. (1903)
- Pleospora farlowiana Rehm (1904)
- Pleospora feijoae Gucevič (1970)
- Pleospora feltgenii Sacc. & P. Syd. (1902)
- Pleospora filicina Feltgen (1903)

== G ==
- Pleospora gailloniae Bubák (1914)
- Pleospora gallica Brunaud ex Sacc. (1914)
- Pleospora gaubae Petr. (1949)
- Pleospora gaussiana Henn. (1906)
- Pleospora genistae Gucevič (1972)
- Pleospora gerberae Dippen. (1931)
- Pleospora gigantasca Rostr. (1903)
- Pleospora gigaspora P. Karst. (1884)
- Pleospora glyceriae Feltgen (1901)
- Pleospora gompholobii Petr. (1954)
- Pleospora graminearum Wehm. (1961)
- Pleospora grevilleae Petr. (1954)
- Pleospora guceviczii Glezer (1959)
- Pleospora gymnadeniae Hollós (1926)

== H ==
- Pleospora halimi Maubl. (1905)
- Pleospora hederae Politis (1935)
- Pleospora helichrysi Hollós (1907)
- Pleospora heliotropii Golovin (1950)
- Pleospora helvetica Niessl (1876)
- Pleospora henningsiana Ruhland, Jahn & Paul (1901)
- Pleospora heterophragmia Sousa da Câmara (1951)
- Pleospora hibisci Gucevič (1970)
- Pleospora hidakana Otani & Mikawa (1971)
- Pleospora hippophaes P. Larsen (1952)
- Pleospora hrubyana Petr. (1931)
- Pleospora hungarica (Moesz) Wehm. (1961)
- Pleospora hydrophila P. Karst. (1883)

== I ==
- Pleospora ilicis Wehm. (1953)
- Pleospora imparseptata Sousa da Câmara (1929)
- Pleospora incarvilleae Byzova (1979)
- Pleospora incerta Crivelli (1983)
- Pleospora indica (Tandon & Bilgrami) K.S. Thind & Mandahar (1966)
- Pleospora insignis Gucevič (1971)
- Pleospora intermedia Speg. (1910)
- Pleospora inulae-candidae Jaap (1916)
- Pleospora iqbalii M.T. Lucas (1969)
- Pleospora islandica Johanson (1884)

== J ==
- Pleospora juglandina Feltgen (1903)
- Pleospora junci Pass. & Beltrani (1882)
- Pleospora juzepczukii Gucevič (1972)

== K ==
- Pleospora kamatii A. Pande (1982)
- Pleospora karatavica Tartenova (1969)
- Pleospora karii Petr. (1936)
- Pleospora kentiae Maubl. (1903)
- Pleospora kerguelensis Henn. (1906)
- Pleospora kirghisorum Domashova (1960)
- Pleospora kok-saghyz Cherem. (1951)
- Pleospora kouh-cherrica Gonz. Frag. (1918)
- Pleospora kouh-sefidica Gonz. Frag. (1918)
- Pleospora kravtzevii (Schwarzman) Byzova (1987)
- Pleospora kudjurica Petr. (1949)
- Pleospora kurdistanica Bubák (1914)
- Pleospora kurtbaueri Wechtl & Riedl (1986)

== L ==
- Pleospora lacustris Feltgen (1903)
- Pleospora laminariana G.K. Sutherl. (1916)
- Pleospora lantanae Jaap (1917)
- Pleospora lapageriae Speg. (1910)
- Pleospora lapataiensis Speg. (1924)
- Pleospora laricina Rehm (1882)
- Pleospora lecanora (Fabre) Rehm (1913)
- Pleospora leontopodii (Cruchet) E. Müll. (1951)
- Pleospora lepidiicola Earle (1901)
- Pleospora leptosphaerulinoides Crivelli (1983)
- Pleospora lesdainii Vouaux (1912)
- Pleospora ligni Kirschst. (1906)
- Pleospora lignicola J. Webster & M.T. Lucas (1961)
- Pleospora ligustri Politis (1935)
- Pleospora lindaviana Reichert (1921)
- Pleospora lini-cathartici Unamuno (1930)
- Pleospora lithophilae Gucevič (1972)
- Pleospora logani Gucevič (1959)
- Pleospora loganicola Gucevič (1959)
- Pleospora lomandrae Petr. (1957)
- Pleospora lutea Wehm. (1961)
- Pleospora luzulae E. Müll. (1977)
- Pleospora lycopersici Marchal & É.J. Marchal (1921)
- Pleospora lycopodii Lind (1913)
- Pleospora lycopodiicola Lind (1934)

== M ==
- Pleospora macedonica Petr. (1936)
- Pleospora macrospora Ces. & De Not. (1863)
- Pleospora magnifica Peck (1906)
- Pleospora magnoliae Massa (1912)
- Pleospora mallorquina Rolland (1905)
- Pleospora mangiferae A. Pande (1980)
- Pleospora massarioides Feltgen (1903)
- Pleospora mauritanica Maire (1907)
- Pleospora megalotheca Tracy & Earle (1901)
- Pleospora meliae Politis (1935)
- Pleospora mesopotamica Bubák (1914)
- Pleospora microspora Niessl (1876)
- Pleospora minor Wehm. (1952)
- Pleospora minuartiae Gucevič (1972)
- Pleospora minuta Kirschst. (1906)
- Pleospora miscanthi H.S. Yates (1917)
- Pleospora mollis Starbäck (1905)
- Pleospora montana Wehm. (1946)
- Pleospora montemartinii Caracc. (1934)
- Pleospora moravica (Petr.) Wehm. (1952)
- Pleospora moricola Pass. (1885)
- Pleospora muelleri Tilak (1960)
- Pleospora myricariae Ade (1923)

== N ==
- Pleospora nabelekii Picb. (1932)
- Pleospora negundinis Oudem. (1900)
- Pleospora neottiae Hollós (1910)
- Pleospora nevadensis Petr. (1931)
- Pleospora nicotianae Av.-Saccá (1922)
- Pleospora nidulans Speg. (1912)
- Pleospora nitida (Ellis & Everh.) Wehm. (1942)
- Pleospora njegusensis Bubák (1915)
- Pleospora nolinae A.W. Ramaley & M.E. Barr (1995)
- Pleospora notarisii (Sacc.) Petr. (1940)

== O ==
- Pleospora obliqua Wehm. (1951)
- Pleospora oblongispora Rehm (1907)
- Pleospora obtusispora Z.Q. Yuan & M.E. Barr (1995)
- Pleospora occultata Oudem. (1894)
- Pleospora oenotherae Feltgen (1903)
- Pleospora oleraceae Tehon & G.L. Stout (1929)
- Pleospora oligasca Bubák (1906)
- Pleospora oligomera Sacc. & Speg. (1878)
- Pleospora ononidis Picb. (1927)
- Pleospora onosmatis Hollós (1906)
- Pleospora opuntiicola Bubák (1906)
- Pleospora orbicularis Auersw. (1869)
- Pleospora orchidearum Henn. (1905)
- Pleospora osmanthicola Dzhalag. (1964)
- Pleospora osyridigena Bubák (1906)

== P ==
- Pleospora paludiscirpi E.G. Simmons (2001)
- Pleospora palustris Berl. (1888)
- Pleospora panamensis (F. Stevens & C.J. King) Petr. (1929)
- Pleospora pegani Bubák (1914)
- Pleospora peganicola Gucevič (1960)
- Pleospora pelagica T.W. Johnson (1956)
- Pleospora pelvetiae G.K. Sutherl. (1915)
- Pleospora penicillus Fuckel (1874)
- Pleospora persica Syd. & P. Syd. (1908)
- Pleospora pertusa Sacc. & Cavara (1900)
- Pleospora phaeocomoides (Sacc.) G. Winter (1886)
- Pleospora phaeospora (Duby) Ces. & De Not. (1863)
- Pleospora philadelphi Politis (1935)
- Pleospora phyllophila Rehm (1923)
- Pleospora pileata (Volkart) E. Müll. & Arx (1950)
- Pleospora pleosphaerioides Wehm. (1946)
- Pleospora pluriseptata Wehm. (1961)
- Pleospora poincianae Gucevič (1960)
- Pleospora polymorpha Maubl. (1903)
- Pleospora potentillae (Rostr.) E. Müll. (1951)
- Pleospora pottiae Moesz (1924)
- Pleospora praeandina Speg. (1909)
- Pleospora primulae Crivelli (1983)
- Pleospora prosopidis Bubák (1914)
- Pleospora proteosperma Speg. (1910)
- Pleospora proustiae Speg. (1909)
- Pleospora pulchra Kirschst. (1906)
- Pleospora punctata Wehm. (1946)
- Pleospora punctulata I. Hino & Katum. (1961)
- Pleospora puyae Speg. (1910)
- Pleospora pygmaea (Ellis & Everh.) M.E. Barr (1990)

== R ==
- Pleospora rainierensis Wehm. (1951)
- Pleospora ranunculi Keissl. (1922)
- Pleospora rehmiana Staritz (1913)
- Pleospora rhanterii Henn. (1904)
- Pleospora rhinanthi Naumov (1925)
- Pleospora rhytidhysterii Petr. (1963)
- Pleospora ribesia Feltgen (1903)
- Pleospora richtophensis Ellis & Everh. (1894)
- Pleospora robusta Speg. (1909)
- Pleospora rosarum Gonz. Frag. (1924)
- Pleospora rotundata Reichert (1921)
- Pleospora rubelloides (Plowr. ex Cooke) J. Webster (1957)
- Pleospora rubicola Syd. & P. Syd. (1900)
- Pleospora rubtzovii Gucevič (1972)
- Pleospora rudis Berl. (1888)

== S ==
- Pleospora saccoboloides Speg. (1912)
- Pleospora salicis Feltgen (1903)
- Pleospora salicorniae P.A. Dang. (1888)
- Pleospora salsolicola Woron. (1915)
- Pleospora santolinae Gucevič (1962)
- Pleospora saponariae (Gonz. Frag.) Wehm. (1952)
- Pleospora scabra Mouton (1900)
- Pleospora scaevolae F. Stevens & P.A. Young (1925)
- Pleospora schoberiae (Sacc.) Berl. (1895)
- Pleospora schrenkiae Tartenova (1969)
- Pleospora scirpicola (DC.) P. Karst. (1873)
- Pleospora scrophulariicola Gucevič (1971)
- Pleospora scutati Gucevič (1971)
- Pleospora sepulta Clem. (1903)
- Pleospora silenes Earle (1905)
- Pleospora smyrnii Gonz. Frag. (1925)
- Pleospora sorghi Feltgen (1903)
- Pleospora sparganii Cooke (1890)
- Pleospora spartii (Sacc.) Sacc. & Berl. (1888)
- Pleospora spartii-juncei E. Müll. (1957)
- Pleospora spartinae (J. Webster & M.T. Lucas) Apinis & Chesters (1964)
- Pleospora spetsbergiensis K. Holm & L. Holm (1993)
- Pleospora spinosae Rolland (1905)
- Pleospora spiraeanthi Schwarzman (1968)
- Pleospora spiraeina Bubák (1915)
- Pleospora statices Lobik (1928)
- Pleospora straminis Sacc. & Speg. (1878)
- Pleospora subalpina E. Müll. (1951)
- Pleospora submersa J. Webster & M.T. Lucas (1961)
- Pleospora subramanianii A. Pande (1982)
- Pleospora subriparia (Cooke) Sacc. (1883)
- Pleospora subsulcata Ellis & Everh. (1890)

== T ==
- Pleospora tassiana Sacc. & Traverso (1911)
- Pleospora taurica Naumov & Dobrozr. (1931)
- Pleospora tessellata Ferd. & Winge (1909)
- Pleospora theae Speschnew (1904)
- Pleospora thymi Gucevič (1960)
- Pleospora tiliae Feltgen (1903)
- Pleospora tomentosa Wehm. (1946)
- Pleospora tragacanthae Rabenh. (1877)
- Pleospora tretiachii Hafellner (2012)
- Pleospora trevoae Speg. (1910)
- Pleospora trevoicola Speg. (1910)
- Pleospora turkestanica Rehm (1911)

== U ==
- Pleospora uniserialis Wehm. (1961)
- Pleospora uzbekistanica Babushk. & Salieva (1989)

== V ==
- Pleospora valesiaca (Niessl) E. Müll. (1951)
- Pleospora vanhoeffenii Henn. (1906)
- Pleospora verecunda (Curr.) Sacc. (1883)
- Pleospora vinosa Kirschst. (1939)
- Pleospora vitalbae (De Not.) Berl. (1888)
- Pleospora vitis-viniferae Frolov (1970)
- Pleospora vulgatissima (Speg.) Sacc. (1883)

== W ==
- Pleospora wehmeyeri A.K. Pande (1970)
- Pleospora welwitschiae Crivelli (1983)
- Pleospora werthiana Henn. (1906)
- Pleospora wulffii Lind (1928)

== X ==
- Pleospora xanthoriae Khodos. & Darmostuk (2016)
- Pleospora xerophylli Petr. (1922)

== Z ==
- Pleospora zimmermannii Roum. (1880)
