= Augusto Napoleone Berlese =

Italian botanist and mycologist

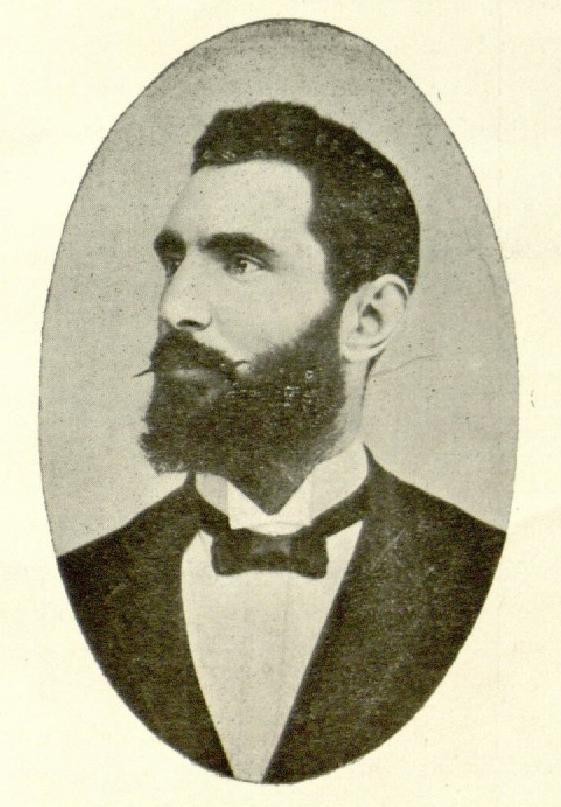
- Portrait of Berlese
- Born: 21 October 1864; Padua, Veneto, Italy
- Died: 26 January 1902 (aged 37); Milan, Italy
- Education: University of Padua
- Known for: Rivista di patologia vegetale (Journal of Plant Pathology)
- Relatives: Antonio Berlese (brother)
- Scientific career
- Fields: Botanist, mycologist
- Workplaces: Camerino (from 1895); Sassari (from 1899)
- Author abbrev. (botany): Berl.

Augusto Napoleone Berlese (21 October 1864, in Padua – 26 January 1903, in Milan) was an Italian botanist and mycologist. He was the brother of entomologist Antonio Berlese 1863–1927, with whom he founded the journal Rivista di patologia vegetale in 1892. Together with Francesco Saccardo and Casimir Roumeguère he edited the exsiccata Fungi Lusitanici a Cl. Moller lecti. Contributiones ad Floram Mycologicam Lusitaniae.

He studied natural sciences at the University of Padua, where following graduation, he worked for several years as a botanical assistant (1885–1889). Later on, he taught classes at the viticulture school in Avellino (from 1892), and at the universities of Camerino (from 1895) and Sassari (from 1899). In 1901 he was appointed professor of phytopathology at the agricultural college in Milan.

The mycological genus Berlesiella (family Herpotrichiellaceae) was named in his honor by Pier Andrea Saccardo.

== Selected works ==
He was the author of the multi-volume series Icones Fungorum (1890–1905). He also made major contributions to Saccardo's Sylloge Fungorum. The following are a few of his other noted works:

- Monografia dei generi Pleospora, Clathrospora e Pyrenophora, 1888 – Monograph on the genera Pleospora, Clathrospora and Pyrenophora.
- Micromycetes Tridentini : contribuzione allo studio dei funghi microscopici del Trentino (with Giacomo Bresadola, 1889) – "Micromycetes Trento"; a contribution to the study of the microscopic fungi of Trentino.
- Fungi moricolae. Iconografia e descrizione dei funghi parassiti dei gelso, 1889 – Fungi moricolae. Iconography and description of parasitic fungi of the mulberry tree.
- I parasiti vegetali delle piante coltivate o utili, 1894 – Plant parasites of cultivated or useful plants.
