= Ulocladium botrytis =

Scientific classification
- Kingdom: Fungi
- Division: Ascomycota
- Class: Dothideomycetes
- Order: Pleosporales
- Family: Pleosporaceae
- Genus: Ulocladium
- Species: U. botrytis

Binomial name
- Ulocladium botrytis Preuss (1851)

Synonyms
- Stemphylium botryosum var. ulocladium Sacc. Wallroth (1886); Stemphylium botryosum var. botrytis Lindau (1908); Alternaria botrytis Woudenberg & Crous (2013); Alternaria abietis Tengwall (1924)

Species of fungus

Ulocladium botrytis is an anamorphic filamentous fungus belonging to the phylum Ascomycota. Commonly found in soil and damp indoor environments, U.botrytis is a hyphomycetous mould found in many regions of the world. It is also occasionally misidentified as a species of the genera Alternaria or Pithomyces due to morphological similarities. Ulocladium botrytis is rarely pathogenic to humans but is associated with human allergic responses and is used in allergy tests. Ulocladium botrytis has been implicated in some cases of human fungal nail infection. The fungus was first discovered in 1851 by German mycologist Carl Gottlieb Traugott Preuss.

== History and taxonomy ==
The genus Ulocladium was first discovered in 1851 by German mycologist, Preuss, in a small batch of his specimens. An abundant hyphomycetous growth of Ulocladium was found on a thin sliver of wood and was drawn and labeled by Preuss as Ulocladium botrytis in his manuscript. This sample was later acquired by the Botanisches Museum in Berlin. At the time, the name of the genus and the species type was published as a nomen nudum due to insufficient description. Furthermore, certain taxa of Ulocladium greatly resemble Alternaria species, resulting in occasional misidentifications. During the late 1900s, a mycologist named Curran described Alternaria maritima as a species new to Ireland. However, Curran's new claim was questioned when another mycologist, Kohlmeyer, initiated a movement to verify the classification of this fungus. After much study, it was found that Alternaria maritima was in fact Ulocladium botrytis. Although Ulocladium is now a genus of its own, it was once included in the genus Alternaria. Several recent DNA-based phylogenetic studies have presented convincing data which places Ulocladium species within the genus Alternaria; however, Ulocladium species do not produce certain compounds and metabolites produced by Alternaria species. Some modern sources believe that Ulocladium botrytis should be considered conspecific with Ulocladium atrum.

== Growth and morphology ==
Ulocladium botrytis is a hyphomycetous mould that favors growth in damp indoor environments. Although it mainly uses nitrogen, other nutrient sources have been tested to determine that U. botrytis growth rate is dependent on the type of media provided. Ulocladium botrytis colonies are commonly velvety in texture and grow in an assortment of colors ranging from dark blackish brown to black. The hyphae are 3-4 μm in diameter and yellow to golden brown in colour with a smooth or slightly rough texture. Conidiophores are short and either erect and ascending, or contorted into various shapes. In addition, they are often bifurcated near the apex at sharp angles. Ulocladium botrytis conidiophores are typically light golden brown in color and smooth, with a length of up to 100 μm and a thickness of around 3-5 μm. The conidia themselves are typically ellipsoidal or obovoid in shape; spheroidal conidia are uncommon in this species. They are golden brown in color and frequently have a minute hilum and a warty, verrucose exterior ornamentation. Ulocladium botrytis conidia typically have three transverse septa and longitudinal septum, but these septa rarely overlap to form a cross. This species never forms conidial chains and the conidia never have a beak.

== Physiology ==
Ulocladium botrytis is an anamorphic fungus, thus it undergoes asexual reproduction. Although it is an asexual fungus, U. botrytis possesses the mating type locus, which consists of two dissimilar DNA sequences termed MAT1-1-1 and MAT1-2-1. These U. botrytis MAT genes are essential for controlling colony size and asexual traits such as conidial size and number in U.botrytis. The U. botrytis MAT genes have lost the ability to regulate sexual reproduction in U. botrytis; however, they have the ability to partially induce sexual reproduction in Cochliobolus heterostrophus, a heterothallic species, upon heterologous complementation.

Ulocladium botrytis has cellulolytic ability and contains a cellulose-degrading enzyme complex that can degrade recalcitrant plant litter under alkaline conditions, a trait that is uncommon in other cellulolytic systems. This fungus' ability to hydrolyze cellulose in the solid form is best at a pH of 6.0, as this pH allows maximal growth of U. botrytis under alkaline conditions. In contrast, its ability to hydrolyze liquid cellulose under alkaline conditions is best at a pH of 8.0. Additionally, a new tyrosine kinase (p56^{tck}) inhibitor called ulocladol, with the molecular formula C_{16}H_{14}O_{7}, was found in ethyl acetate extract from U. botrytis. Ulocladium botrytis also synthesizes extracellular keratinases and can grow in the presence of keratin. Moreover, this fungus can produce carboxymethyl cellulase and protease on Eichhornia crassipes wastes.

As a fungus, Ulocladium botrytis produces a diverse collection of chemical compounds and metabolites. It produces mixtures of volatile organic compounds that include terpenes, alcohols, ketones, and nitrogen-containing compounds. Furthermore, U. botrytis aids in decreasing aldehyde levels. Dodecane and 9,10,12,13-tetrahydroxyheneicosanoic acid were also found as metabolites of U. botrytis. Another U. botrytis metabolite is 1-hydroxy-6-methyl-8-(hydroxymethyl)xanthone, which has antimicrobial effects indicating its identification as an antifungal metabolite. Importantly, a major protein allergen of Alternaria alternata, termed Alt a 1, and an allergen homologous to it is expressed in the excretory-secretory materials of U. botrytis.

== Habitat and ecology ==
The distribution of Ulocladium botrytis is fairly broad, wherein it has been found worldwide in areas of Europe, North America, Egypt, India, Pakistan, and Kuwait. It is often isolated from soil, where it is a common contaminant; however, U. botrytis also grows on rotten wood, paper, and other textiles or on dead herbaceous plants. It also heavily favors growth in damp indoor environments. This fungus has been found growing on deciduous alder trees (Alnus) which belong to the birch family Betulaceae. Trees in this family include the American green alder and the mountain alder. U. botrytis can also be found growing on the evergreen coniferous tree genus Pseudotsuga of the family Pinaceae; different trees include the Douglas fir and the big-cone spruce. In addition, this fungus can grow on the flowering plant genus Sphaeralcea of the mallow family Malvaceae; plants include the desert hollyhock and the prairie mallow. A previously conducted study also isolated a unique strain of Ulocladium botrytis, strain number 193A4, from the marine sponge Callyspongia vaginalis. Another independent study found seed-borne Ulocladium botrytis from pearl millet (Pennisetum typhoides).

Relationships with other organisms coexisting in the same ecosystem has served to be beneficial for some organisms and this applies to U. botrytis. Ulocladium botrytis is capable of surviving in xerophilic ecosystems and alkaline-calcareous soils, both extreme habitats, when associating with the tree species Scutia buxifolia. The U. botrytis strain associated with this environment is called LPSC 813 and has great cellulolytic ability. Ulocladium. botrytis has potential, albeit limited, to be used as a biocontrol agent against the parasitic herbaceous plant genus Orobanche that affect the yield of certain crops like tomatoes. Ulocladium botrytis is also capable of in vitro antagonism of root-disease pathogens such as Heterobasidion annosum, Phellinus weirii, and Armillaria ostoyae. Apart from U. botrytis, other Ulocladium species such as U. atrum and U. oudemansii also present biocontrol potential.

== Impact on human health ==
Ulocladium botrytis is currently regarded as a source of home allergen sensitization and is used in skin-prick tests that test for mould allergens and work-related allergens. This is due to the production and detection of Alt a 1, the major allergen produced by Alternaria alternata, in U.botrytis. In addition, U. botrytis also releases another allergen, homologous to Alt a 1, that possesses the capacity to cause allergic responses in humans. The allergic symptoms caused by U. botrytis are compatible with rhinitis and asthma; however, U. botrytis was also found in patients of allergic fungal sinusitis. Importantly, Ulocladium botrytis is rarely pathogenic to humans but has been found to be associated with cases of onychomycosis, a fungal infection of the nail.
