= Comoclathris =

Scientific classification
- Domain: Eukaryota
- Kingdom: Fungi
- Division: Ascomycota
- Class: Dothideomycetes
- Order: Pleosporales
- Family: Pleosporaceae
- Genus: Comoclathris; Clem.

Type species
- Comoclathris lanata Clem.

Genus of fungi

Comoclathris is a genus of fungi in the family Diademaceae.

== Species ==
As accepted by Species Fungorum;

- Comoclathris antarctica Ł. Istel, J. Pawłowska & Wrzosek (2021)
- Comoclathris arrhenatheri Thambug., Camporesi & K.D. Hyde (2017)
- Comoclathris bougainvilleae S.D. Patil & C. Ramesh (1987)
- Comoclathris compressa (Harkn.) Shoemaker & C.E. Babc. (1992)
- Comoclathris depressa (Peck) Shoemaker & C.E. Babc. (1992)
- Comoclathris emodi Shoemaker & C.E. Babc. (1992)
- Comoclathris europaeae Brahmanage, Camporesi & K.D. Hyde (2020)
- Comoclathris extrema Shoemaker & C.E. Babc. (1992)
- Comoclathris flammulae Brahmanage, Camporesi & K.D. Hyde (2020)
- Comoclathris galatellae D. Pem, T.S. Bulgakov & K.D. Hyde (2020)
- Comoclathris harperi Shoemaker & C.E. Babc. (1992)
- Comoclathris incompta (Sacc. & Martelli) Ariyaw. & K.D. Hyde (2015)
- Comoclathris indica M.S. Patil & A.B. Pawar (1987)
- Comoclathris italica Tibpromma, Camporesi & K.D. Hyde (2016)
- Comoclathris lanata Clem. (1909)
- Comoclathris lini Wanas., E.B.G. Jones, Camporesi & K.D. Hyde (2015)
- Comoclathris lonicerae Brahmanage, Camporesi & K.D. Hyde (2020)
- Comoclathris magna Shoemaker & C.E. Babc. (1992)
- Comoclathris miliarakisii Maire (1930)
- Comoclathris persica Shoemaker & C.E. Babc. (1992)
- Comoclathris pimpinellae S. Konta, Bulgakov & K.D. Hyde (2016)
- Comoclathris platysporioides (M.L. Farr & Horner) Shoemaker & C.E. Babc. (1992)
- Comoclathris pyrenophoroides (Sacc.) Checa (1998)
- Comoclathris quadriseptata (Cooke & Harkn.) Shoemaker & C.E. Babc. (1992)
- Comoclathris rosae Wanas., Camporesi, E.B.G. Jones & K.D. Hyde (2018)
- Comoclathris rosarum Wanas., Camporesi, E.B.G. Jones & K.D. Hyde (2018)
- Comoclathris rosigena Wanas., Camporesi, E.B.G. Jones & K.D. Hyde (2018)
- Comoclathris salsolae (Griffiths) Shoemaker & C.E. Babc. (1992)
- Comoclathris sedi Wanas., Ariyaw., Camporesi & K.D. Hyde (2015)
- Comoclathris sisyrinchii (Speg.) Shoemaker & C.E. Babc. (1992)
- Comoclathris sororia (Bubák) Shoemaker & C.E. Babc. (1992)
- Comoclathris spartii Thambug., Camporesi & K.D. Hyde (2014)
- Comoclathris typhicola (Cooke) Ariyaw. & K.D. Hyde (2015)
- Comoclathris utahensis (Ellis & Everh.) Shoemaker & C.E. Babc. (1992)
- Comoclathris verrucosa Shoemaker & C.E. Babc. (1992)
- Comoclathris verruculosa (O.E. Erikss.) Nograsek (1990)
- Comoclathris wehmeyeri A. Pande (1980)
- Comoclathris xerophila (Speg.) Shoemaker & C.E. Babc. (1992)

Former species (all are Diademaceae family unless stated);

- C. baccata (Ellis) Shoemaker & C.E. Babc. (1992) = Clathrospora baccata
- C. deflectens (P. Karst.) Nograsek (1990) = Platysporoides deflectens, Pleosporaceae
- C. ipomoeae Clem. (1911) = Graphyllium ipomoeae
- C. pentamera (P. Karst.) S. Ahmad (1979) = Graphyllium pentamerum
- C. permunda (Cooke) E. Müll. (1979) = Clathrospora permunda
- C. planispora (Ellis) Harr (1971) = Graphyllium planispora
