= Ulocladium chlamydosporum =

Scientific classification
- Domain: Eukaryota
- Kingdom: Fungi
- Division: Ascomycota
- Class: Dothideomycetes
- Order: Pleosporales
- Family: Pleosporaceae
- Genus: Ulocladium
- Species: U. chlamydosporum

Binomial name
- Ulocladium chlamydosporum Mouch.

Species of fungus

Ulocladium chlamydosporum is a filamentous fungus. This fungus is salt tolerant and has been found in water from the Dead Sea and did not grow out on agar without the presence of salt. The presence of copper and zinc can stimulate growth in U. chlamydosporum, whereas lead, manganese, and molybdenum inhibit growth.
