= Ulocladium chartarum =

Scientific classification
- Kingdom: Fungi
- Division: Ascomycota
- Class: Dothideomycetes
- Order: Pleosporales
- Family: Pleosporaceae
- Genus: Ulocladium
- Species: U. chartarum

Binomial name
- Ulocladium chartarum (Preuss) E. G. Simmons (1848)

Synonyms
- Alternaria chartarum Preuss (1848)

Species of fungus

Ulocladium chartarum (/juːloʊˈkleɪdiəm ˈtʃɑːrtərəm/) is an ascomycetes mushroom, one of the many in the genus Ulocladium.

== History and taxonomy ==
Ulocladium chartarum was discovered in 1848. It was originally called Alternaria chartarum, but was given its current name by E. G. Simmons in 1967.

Ulocladium chartarum is a mold commonly found in indoor environments. Members of the genus Ulocladium are often found in water-damaged materials, and can even be found on paper if conditions are right. It is often found together with species Stachybotrys.(Frisvad and Gravesen 1994, Gravesen et al. 1997) The presence of Ulocladium is a good indicator of wet environments or water damage. This genus is morphologically similar to Alternaria and possesses the same major allergen. It appears to live in the same places as S. chartarum although with more frequency, as it is able to grow under the same humidity range as Alternaria.

Almost no secondary metabolites have been isolated from the mold. All four isolates inoculated on materials grew well but did not produce any metabolic quantities of secondary metabolites, which is in accordance with the literature where few metabolites from this genus have been described. Analyses of natural samples with excessive growth have not revealed any metabolites in the polarity range.

== Growth and morphology ==
The teleomorph of U. chartarum is unknown. The colonies can range from velvety to floccose with coloration ranging from olivaceous brown to black. They grow rapidly.

Conidia can range from obovoid to short ellipsoidal, with colors of golden brown to blackish brown, roughened with 1–5 oblique or longitudinal septa and 1–5 lateral septa. It can be born singly or in short chains from sympodial conidiophores. The colonies grow rapidly, and range from powdery to lanose and black or olivaceous black. Conidiophores are erect, straight or flexuose; often somewhat geniculate, but mostly unbranched. They can be up to 50 x 4–5 um, golden brown, smooth-walled, conidial scars brown. The conidia commonly form in chains of 2–10, with ellipsoidal or obovoidal shapes and often with short peaks. Its colors can range from medium brown to olivaceous, or black and verrucose. It is 18–38 x 11–20 um, with 1–5 (commonly 3) transfers and several oblique or longitudinal septa.

Secondary conidiophores are often present on conidia. Conidiophores septate can be simple or branched, straight, flexuous. They often geniculate with 1–8 pores up to 40–50 x 5–7 um that are golden brown and smooth-walled. Conidia are solitary or in chains of 2–10, obovoid to short ellipsoidal, 18–38 x 11–20 um, with 1–5 (commonly 3) transfers and 1–5 longitudinal or oblique septa, medium brown to olivaceous, smooth walled or verrucose, base conical at first (becoming round with age), apex broadly rounded before "false beak" production. Each "false beak" is in form and function a conidiophore forming secondary conidia and is therefore distinct from the gradually tapering true beaks of Alternaria.

Good sporulation can be obtained by growing cultures on potato-carrot or hay-infusion agar under near-UV (black) light. Incubation temperature alone can alter the size, color, and shape of spores in U. chartarum. U. chartarum is heterokaryotic, so over different temperature ranges, spore morphogenesis is directed by different nuclei.

== Physiology ==
Cellulase activities of U. chartarum were found to be influenced by the mode of incubation as well as by the age of the fungal culture.

== Habitat and ecology ==
U. chartarum has been reported in Canada, Europe (Great Britain), India, Iraq, Israel, Kuwait, Pakistan, Saudi Arabia and South Africa. It has been isolated from soil, dung, emulsion paint, grasses, fibers, wood, paper, and fibres.

A necrosis of leaves of Quercus pubescens caused by the fungus U. chartarum has been reported. This fungus causes leaf spots under natural conditions and also following artificial inoculation of unwounded attached leaves.

== Medical significance ==
A cutaneous mycosis caused by U. chartarum in a heart transplant recipient has been reported. The infection cleared after complete surgical excision and six months of oral itraconazole therapy. In vitro activity of amphotericin B, fluconazole, itraconazole, voriconazole, ravuconazole and terbinafine against the clinical isolate is shown. The low production of the metabolites indicates, however, that Ulocladium is not a major toxicological problem. This may be confirmed by testing its in vitro pulmonary toxicity and inflammatory potentials.

U. chartarum is well known to be involved in biodeterioration of organic and inorganic substrates covered with organic deposits and is expected to be a possible contaminant in space vehicles. It and other fungal species could find a favourable environment to grow invasively unnoticed in the depth of surfaces containing very small amount of substrate, posing a risk factor for biodegradation of structural components, as well as a direct threat for crew health.

Cutaneous granulomas due to the mold fungus U. chartarum has been reported.
