= Pleospora alfalfae =

Scientific classification
- Kingdom: Fungi
- Division: Ascomycota
- Class: Dothideomycetes
- Order: Pleosporales
- Family: Pleosporaceae
- Genus: Pleospora
- Species: P. alfalfae

Binomial name
- Pleospora alfalfae E.G. Simmons (1986)

Species of fungus

Pleospora alfalfae is a plant pathogen infecting alfalfa.
