= Charles Bagge Plowright =

British doctor and mycologist (1849–1910)

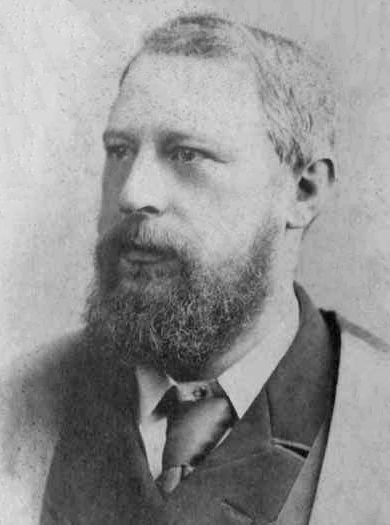
- Born: 3 April 1849; King's Lynn, Norfolk, England
- Died: 24 April 1910 (aged 61); North Wootton, Norfolk, England
- Occupation: Surgeon
- Known for: mycology

Charles Bagge Plowright (3 April 1849 – 24 April 1910) was a British medical doctor and mycologist.

Plowright's training as a doctor began when he was apprenticed to Dr. John Lowe, Surgeon to the West Norfolk and Lynn Hospital. He continued his training at Anderson's University in Glasgow, where for a time he worked as a surgical dresser with Joseph Lister. In 1870 he passed the MRCP in England and worked for a time as House Surgeon at the West Norfolk and Lynn Hospital before setting up private practice in King's Lynn. He was also a Medical Officer for Health for many years in Freebridge Lynn, and was the Hunterian Professor of Comparative Anatomy and Physiology at the Royal College of Surgeons from 1890 to 1894. While a professor he gave lectures on ergot and fungi in the human body which were noted in the British Journal of Medicine.

Plowright's most significant contributions were in mycology. In 1872 he published a list of 800 Norfolk fungi in the Transactions of the Norfolk and Norwich Naturalists' Society and was elected an honorary member of the Society. Starting in 1873, Plowright published a series of fasciculi (pamphlets intended to be collected into a book) titled Sphaeriacei Britannici describing members of the fungal genus Sphaeria (species which can be placed in Pseudovalsa, Macrospora, Homostegia families, and others). In these three exsiccata series he distributed 300 numbered herbarium specimen units (Cent. 1 - Cent. 3, 1873-1878). With his collaborator William Phillips, Plowright published a series of papers titled New and Rare British Fungi (1871–1884) which described almost 300 new species. Plowright also contributed to The Gardeners' Chronicle for over thirty years, writing principally on fungal diseases of plants; he was an early advocate in England of the use of Bordeaux mixture. Early in his career he made a special collection of Pyrenomycetae (now Sordariomycetes) and published several papers on them; he later moved on to the Uredinaceae, in 1889 publishing A Monograph of the British Uredinaea and Ustilaginaea. He was one of the early organizers of the British Mycological Society and served as president in 1898–9.

In 1883, botanist Pier Andrea Saccardo in Syll. Fung., circumscribed a genus of fungi, Plowrightia belonging to the family Dothioraceae and named it in Plowright's honour.

Plowright had an interest in archaeology and published a number of articles on the subject, including several works on woad.

Plowright also was active in his local community, serving as a local magistrate, director and vice-chairman of a local girl's high school, and governor of the Lynn Grammar School.

== Family ==
Plowright married Mary Jane Lovie Robb, daughter of an Edinburgh merchant, and they had two children: Edith Mary (b. 1875) and Charles Tertius Maclean Plowright (1879–1935). Edith Mary married Thomas Petch, also a mycologist, in 1908.
