= Stemphylium bolickii =

Scientific classification
- Kingdom: Fungi
- Division: Ascomycota
- Class: Dothideomycetes
- Order: Pleosporales
- Family: Pleosporaceae
- Genus: Stemphylium
- Species: S. bolickii

Binomial name
- Stemphylium bolickii Sobers & C.P. Seym. [as 'bolicki'], (1963)

Species of fungus

Stemphylium bolickii is a plant pathogen infecting kalanchoes.
