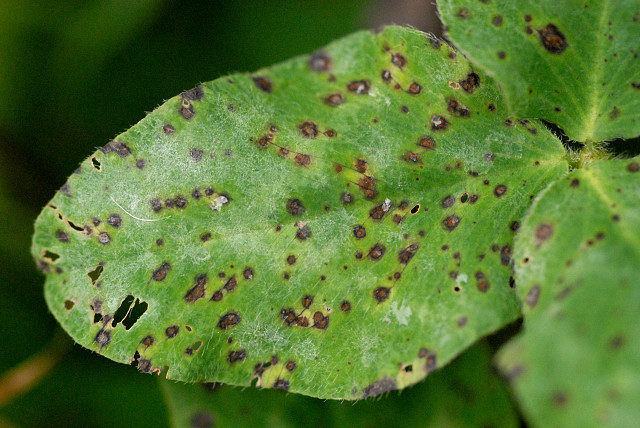
- Leaf damage from Stemphylium sarciniforme

Scientific classification
- Kingdom: Fungi
- Division: Ascomycota
- Class: Dothideomycetes
- Order: Pleosporales
- Family: Pleosporaceae
- Genus: Stemphylium
- Species: S. sarciniforme

Binomial name
- Stemphylium sarciniforme (Cavara) Wiltshire [as 'sarcinaeforme'], (1938)

Synonyms
- Macrosporium sarciniforme Cavara [as 'sarcinaeforme'], (1890); Thyrospora sarciniforme (Cavara) Tehon & E.Y. Daniels [as 'sarcinaeforme'], (1925)

= Stemphylium sarciniforme =

Species of fungus

Stemphylium sarciniforme is a plant pathogen infecting lentil, red clover and chickpea.
