= Graphyllium =

Scientific classification
- Domain: Eukaryota
- Kingdom: Fungi
- Division: Ascomycota
- Class: Dothideomycetes
- Order: Pleosporales
- Family: Diademaceae
- Genus: Graphyllium; Clem.

Type species
- Graphyllium chloës Clem.

Genus of fungi

Graphyllium is a genus of fungi in the family Diademaceae.

== Species ==
As accepted by Species Fungorum;

- Graphyllium caracolinense D.A.C. Almeida, Gusmão & A.N. Mill. (2014)
- Graphyllium chloes Clem. (1901)
- Graphyllium dasylirii A.W. Ramaley (1995)
- Graphyllium graminis (Ellis & Everh.) Rehm (1915)
- Graphyllium hysterioides (Ellis & Everh.) M.E. Barr (1987)
- Graphyllium ipomoeae (Clem.) M.E. Barr (1987)
- Graphyllium manitobense Dearn. & Bisby (1929)
- Graphyllium panduratum Checa, Shoemaker & L. Umaña (2007)
- Graphyllium pentamerum (P. Karst.) M.E. Barr (1990)
- Graphyllium planispora (Ellis) M.E. Barr (1987)

Former species;

- G. aquaticum (Griffiths) Shoemaker & C.E. Babc. (1992) = Pleospora aquatica, Pleosporaceae
- G. californianum M.E. Barr (1990) = Diademosa californiana, Diademaceae
- G. chloes var. junci Peck (1912) = Graphyllium chloes
- G. dakotense Rehm (1915) = Pleospora dakotensis, Pleosporaceae
- G. permundum (Cooke) M.E. Barr (1990) = Clathrospora permunda, Diademaceae
