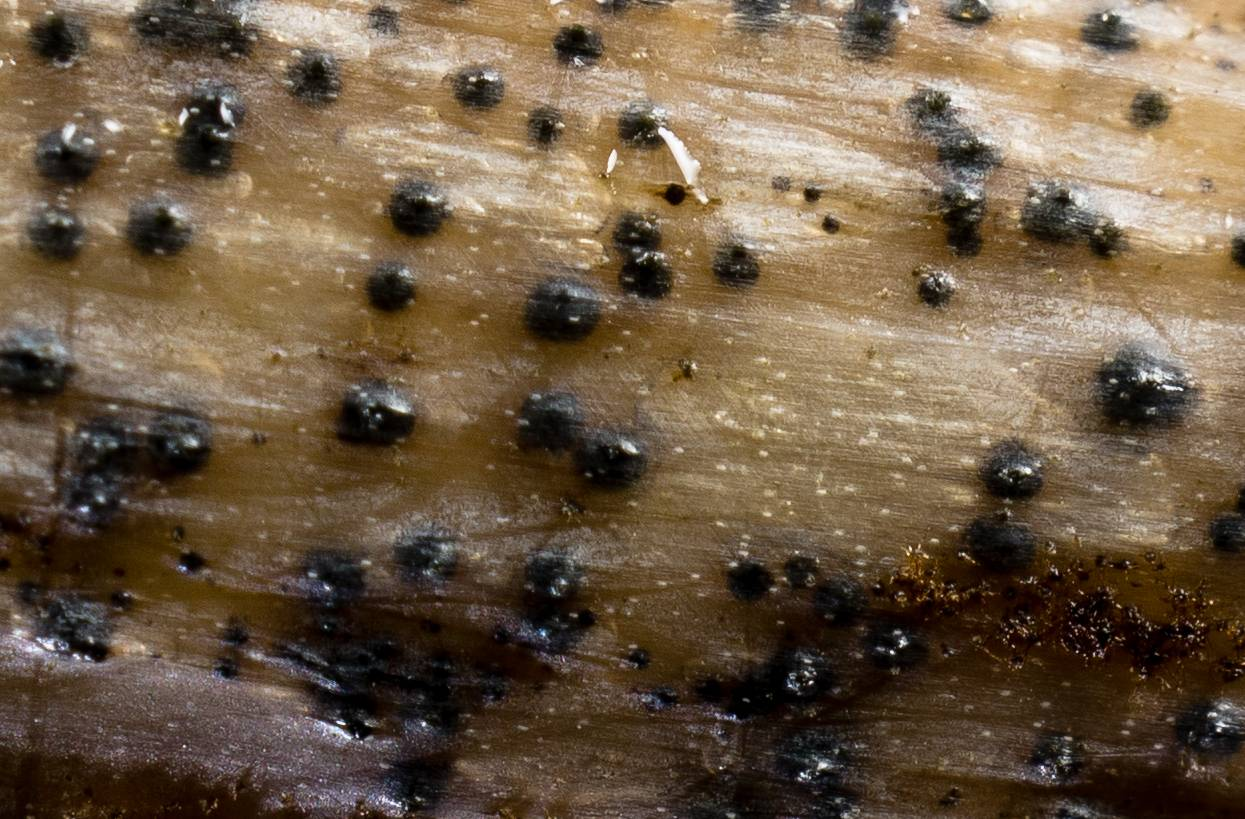

Scientific classification
- Domain: Eukaryota
- Kingdom: Fungi
- Division: Ascomycota
- Class: Dothideomycetes
- Order: Pleosporales
- Family: Pleosporaceae
- Genus: Pleospora
- Species: P. herbarum

Binomial name
- Pleospora herbarum (Pers.) Rabenh. (1857)

Synonyms
- Alternaria putrefaciens (Fuckel) E.G.Simmons (1995); Clasterosporium putrefaciens (Fuckel) Sacc. (1886); Clasterosporium putrefaciens var. crucipes Speschnew (1901); Delacourea samarae (Fuckel) Cooke; Macrosporium commune Rabenh. (1870); Macrosporium parasiticum Thüm. Macrosporium sarcinula Berk. (1838); Phoma albicans Roberge ex Desm. Pleospora albicans Fuckel; Pleospora asparagi Rabenh. Pleospora denotata (Cooke & Ellis) Sacc. (1883); Pleospora euonymi Fuckel (1870); Pleospora frangulae Fuckel (1870); Pleospora gymnocladi Bagnis (1877); Pleospora herbarum var. cichorii Cooke; Pleospora herbarum var. glumarum Berk. & Broome; Pleospora herbarum var. herbarum (Pers.) Rabenh. (1863); Pleospora herbarum var. iridia Cooke; Pleospora herbarum var. pisi (Sowerby) Cooke; Pleospora labiatarum Cooke & Harkn. (1882); Pleospora leguminum (Wallr.) Rabenh. Pleospora mali Hesler (1927); Pleospora meliloti Rabenh. (1883); Pleospora pisi (Sowerby) Fuckel (1870); Pleospora putrefaciens A.B.Frank; Pleospora salsolae Fuckel (1864); Pleospora samarae Fuckel (1870); Pleospora typhae Pass. Sphaeria asparagi (Rabenh. ex Sacc.) Plowr. Sphaeria denotata Cooke & Ellis (1877); Sphaeria herbarum Pers. (1801); Sphaeria leguminum Wallr. (1833); Sphaeria pisi Sowerby (1803); Sphaeria samarae (Fuckel) Plowr. Sporidesmium putrefaciens Fuckel (1870); Stemphylium botryosum f.sp. lycopersici Rotem, Y. Cohen & I.Wahl (1966); Stemphylium herbarum E.G.Simmons (1986)

= Pleospora herbarum =

Species of fungus

Pleospora herbarum is a species of fungus in the family Pleosporaceae. It is a plant pathogen infecting several hosts including alfalfa, apples, asparagus, tomatoes, citruses and chickpea. It has a cosmopolitan distribution, and is common in temperate and subtropical regions. The fungus was first described under the name Sphaeria herbarum by Christian Hendrik Persoon in 1801.
