= Stemphylium globuliferum =

Scientific classification
- Kingdom: Fungi
- Division: Ascomycota
- Class: Dothideomycetes
- Order: Pleosporales
- Family: Pleosporaceae
- Genus: Stemphylium
- Species: S. globuliferum

Binomial name
- Stemphylium globuliferum (Vestergr.) E.G. Simmons, (1969)

Synonyms
- Macrosporium globuliferum Vestergr., (1896)

Species of fungus

Stemphylium globuliferum is a plant pathogen infecting alfalfa.
