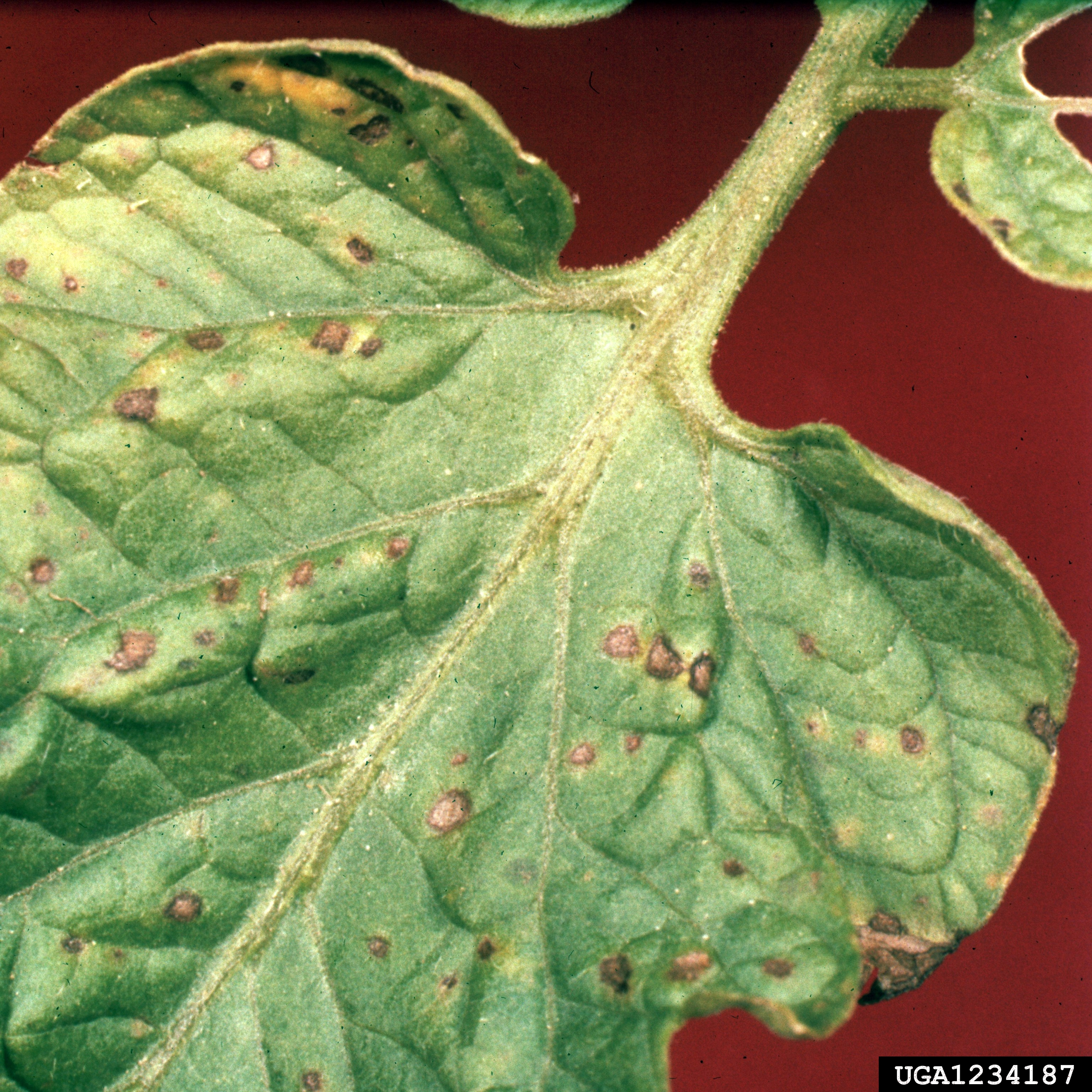
- Stemphylium solani on tomato leaf

Scientific classification
- Kingdom: Fungi
- Division: Ascomycota
- Class: Dothideomycetes
- Order: Pleosporales
- Family: Pleosporaceae
- Genus: Stemphylium
- Species: S. solani

Binomial name
- Stemphylium solani G.F.Weber (1930)

= Stemphylium solani =

Species of fungus

Stemphylium solani is a plant pathogen fungus in the phylum Ascomycota. It is the causal pathogen for grey leaf spot in tomatoes and leaf blight in alliums and cotton, though a wide range of additional species can serve as hosts. Symptoms include white spots on leaves and stems that progress to sunken red or purple lesions and finally leaf necrosis. S. solani reproduces and spreads through the formation of conidia on conidiophores. The teleomorph name of Stemphyllium is Pleospora though there are no naturally known occurrences of sexual reproduction. Resistant varieties of tomato and cotton are common, though the pathogen remains an important disease in Chinese garlic cultivation.

== Hosts and symptoms ==
=== Hosts ===
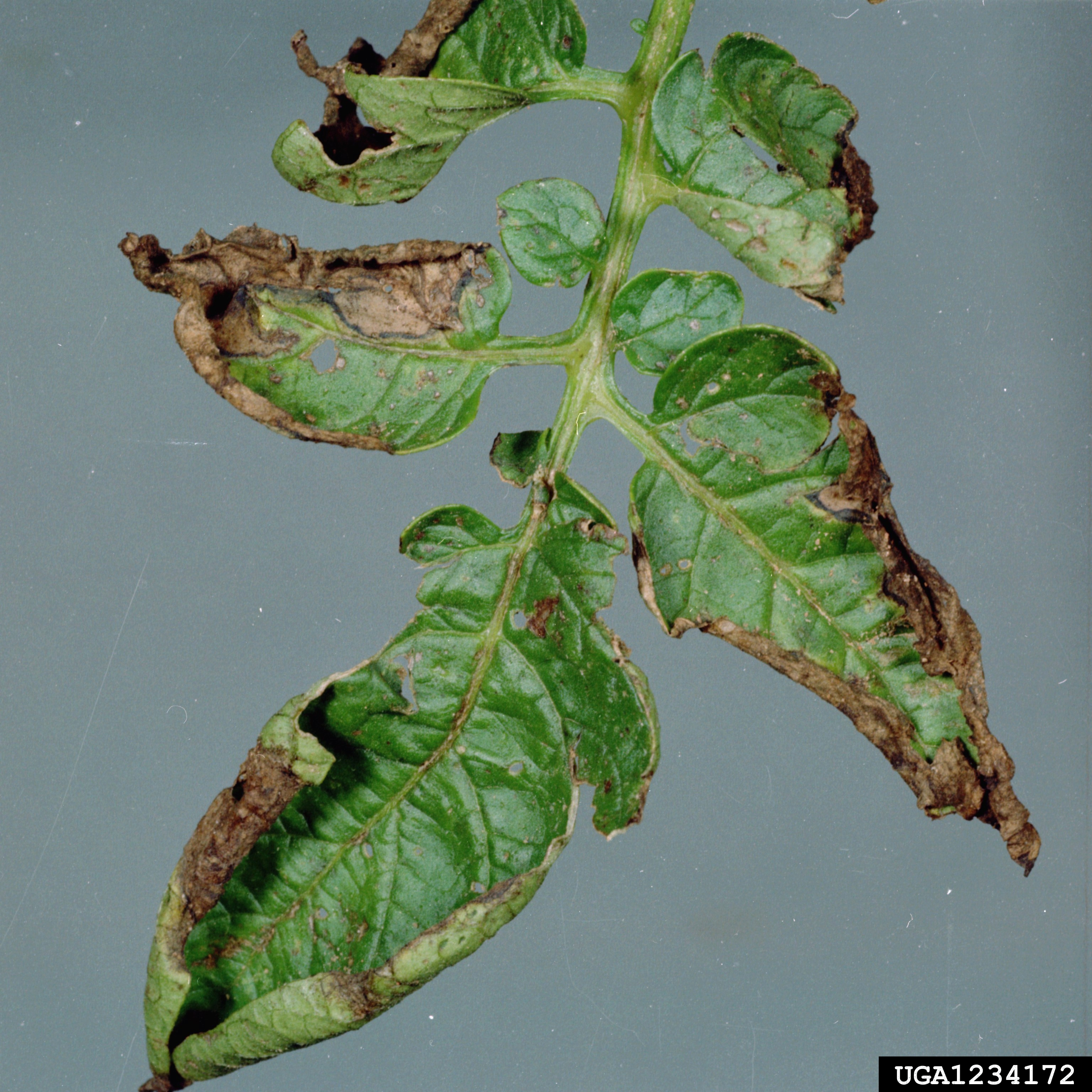
Darkening lesions on tomato leaves

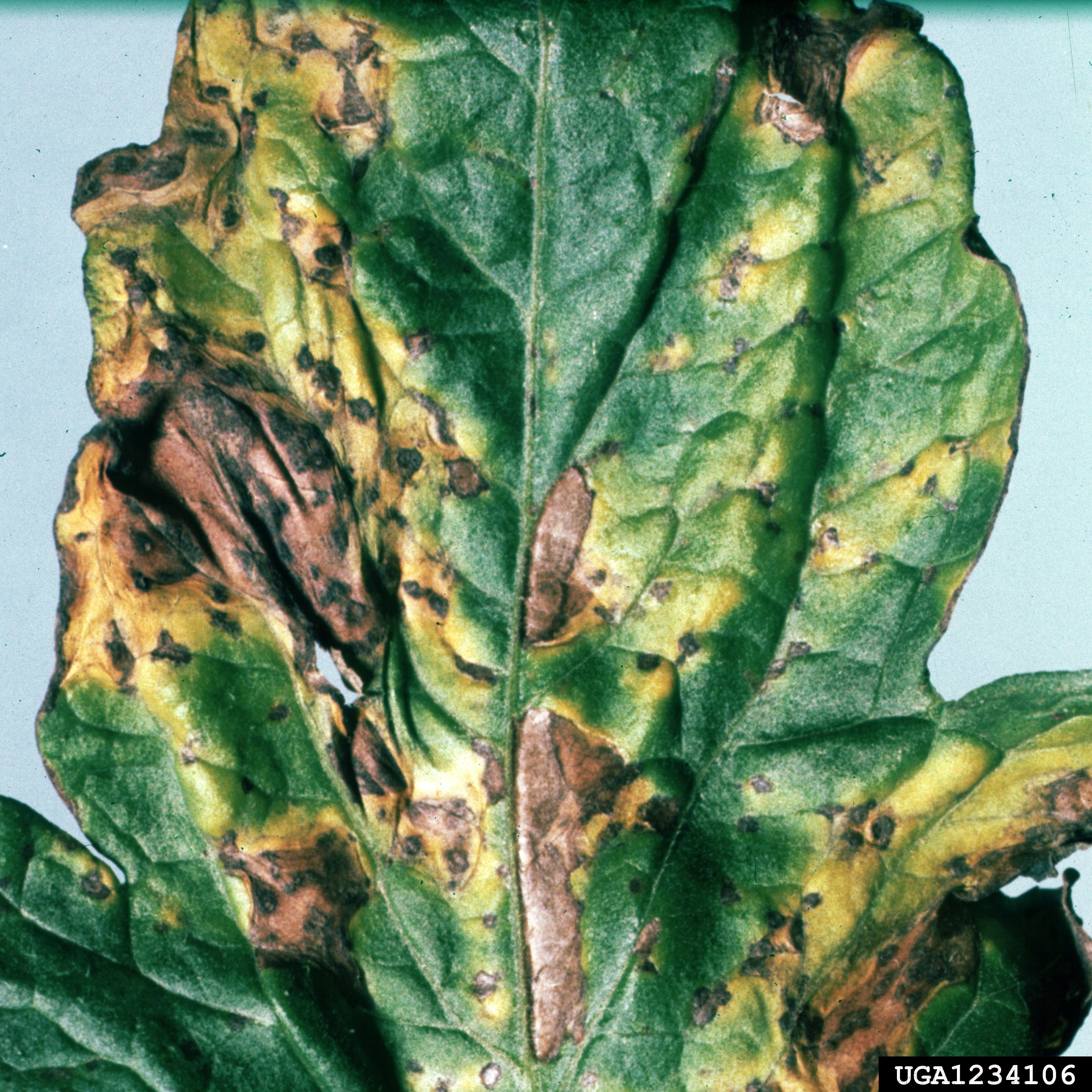
Advanced necrosis on tomato leaf

Stemphylium solani is of greatest concern in tomatoes, potatoes, peppers, garlic, onions, and cotton, though a wide range of over 20 species have proven susceptible. In tomatoes and potatoes, the resulting disease is known as grey leaf spot. In alliums it is known as leaf blight. Additional hosts are listed below.

- Onion, Allium ascalonicum
- Tobacco, Nicotiana tabacum
- Maize, Zea mays
- Leek, Allium odorum
- Garlic, Allium sativum
- Potato, Solanum tuberosum
- Spinach, Spinacia oleracea
- Radish, Raphanus sativus
- Tomato, Solanum lycopersicum
- Chinese cabbage, Brassica chinensis
- Coriander, Coriandrum sativum
- Rape, Brassica campestris
- Pea, Pisum sativum
- Cotton, Gossypium hirsutum
- Sorghum, Sorghum vulgare
- Wheat, Triticum aestivum
- Broad bean, Vicia faba
- Rice, Oryza sativa
- Pepper, Capsicum annuum
- Rape, Brassica napus
- Amaranth, Amaranthus mangostanus

=== Symptoms ===
In alliums, infection is first visible as oval white spots, 1–3 mm in length, scattered irregularly over the leaf surface. These spots grow into red or purple colored lesions with a yellow margin and finally progress to leaf wilting and necrosis. Experimentally infected plants have been shown to progress from initial infection to leaf necrosis within eight days. Infection is found only on the stems and leaves of plants. In tomatoes, S. solani symptoms begin as round to oval dark specks on both sides of the leaf with older leaves being affected first. Young lesions may have a yellow halo. As lesions age, they become gray, dry and brittle, eventually falling away to create shot-holing in the leaf. Severe infection results in leaf drop.

== Disease cycle and morphology ==
Stemphylium solani is the anamorph stage and reproduces primarily through the production of conidia on conidiophores. Once produced, disease is thought to spread quickly to additional hosts via either mycelium when leaves of adjacent plants are touching or conidia, which can spread through rain or air. S. solani is also believed to be spread via infected seed. Conidia can cause several stages of secondary infection throughout the growing season but infection is most severe following early fruiting. The teleomorph stage of Stemphylium is Pleospora. Sexual ascospores form under cold conditions but natural occurrences have not been documented. Instead, conidia and mycelia overwintering in plant debris are believed to serve as the primary inoculum.

Stemphylium solani grown in potato sugar agar (PSA) culture are characteristically slow growing and darken with age, first to a yellow-brown color after 4 days and then red. Conidiophores grow as long as 170 μm in length with a swollen apex and one to three transverse septa.

== Environment ==
Though minimal data specific to S. solani is available, Stemphyllium spp. thrive in high humidity (relative humidity of 85-90%), more than eight hours of leaf wetness (caused by rain, fog, or dew) and temperatures near 18 °C. Though leaf wetness is important, rainfall per se does not appear necessary if humidity or fog provide sufficient leaf wetness. Presence of debris from the previous season may harbor inoculum and increase disease incidence. Heavy fruiting and good soil fertility also favor disease development.

== Management ==
Stemphylium solani is most commonly controlled with the use of disease resistant cultivars, especially in tomato and cotton. Resistant tomatoes are marked with the code “St”. Varieties include Beefmaster, Better Boy, Celebrity, First Lady II, Floramerica, Jackpot, and Lemon Boy, Amelia, Crown Jewel, FL 47, FL 91, Linda, Phoenix, Quincy, RPT 6153, Sebring, Solar Fire, Soraya, Talledega, Tygress, and many others. Resistance is inherited via the gene Sm, a single dominant gene.

However, resistant cultivars may lack desirable traits, such as a tendency toward early bolting when allium flowers are desirable for markets. When satisfactory resistant cultivars are unavailable, fungicides (tebuconazole, procymidone) can be applied as a seed treatment to provide systemic early season management or as a foliar spray 2-3 times throughout the season. Triazole has been shown in laboratory studies to effectively control mycelial growth and provides local systemic protection. Risk of infection can also be reduced by delaying fall planting of garlic until temperatures fall below the 18 °C optimal for S. solani growth, and good field sanitation.

== Importance ==
With the development of resistant cultivars in of the major crops impacted by this pathogen, the importance of S. solani has been largely mitigated. However, as new strains emerge, continued outbreaks in new crops may continue to cause significant damage and demand a response. For example, the migration of S. solani into the Chinese garlic crop resulted in a 30% average yield loss between 2004 and 2008 with some fields sustaining 70% loss. Similarly, epidemics in cotton have been reported in Brazil and India, resulting in 100% crop loss in India.

=== Geography ===
Stemphylium solani is found throughout the world. It was first by described by George Weber in 1930 in Florida, United States. It has since been reported in Brazil, Venezuela, India, South Africa, Spain, Australia, Egypt, and China.

=== Related pathogens and diagnosis ===
Though 33 species of Stemphylium have been recognized, many are saprophytic. However, S. botryosum, S. globuliferum, S. herbarum, S. alfalfae, and S. vesicarium all cause agricultural damage including leaf spot in alfalfa and red clover, purple spot in asparagus, and leaf spot in garlic and onions. S. veicarium has historically been the causal agent for leaf spot in garlic and onions but since the late 1990s, S. solani has also been shown to be pathogenic to alliums and a significant cause of disease in Chinese garlic crops. Diagnosis of specific species is determined based on distinct conidia and conidiophore morphology, though significant overlap in characteristics makes identification difficult. DNA studies are currently the most conclusive method of correctly distinguishing species of Stemphylium. In addition to other strains of Stemphyllium, symptoms caused by S. solani can also be easily mistaken for Alternaria porri and Septoria Leaf Spot.
