= Lewia =

Lewis

Scientific classification
- Domain: Eukaryota
- Kingdom: Fungi
- Division: Ascomycota
- Class: Dothideomycetes
- Order: Pleosporales
- Family: Pleosporaceae
- Genus: Lewia; M.E. Barr & E.G. Simmons

Type species
- Lewia scrophulariae M.E. Barr & E.G. Simmons

Genus of fungi

Lewia is a genus of fungi in the family Pleosporaceae.
