= Clathrospora =

Scientific classification
- Domain: Eukaryota
- Kingdom: Fungi
- Division: Ascomycota
- Class: Dothideomycetes
- Order: Pleosporales
- Family: Diademaceae
- Genus: Clathrospora; Rabenh. (1857)

Type species
- Clathrospora elynae Rabenh. (1857)

Genus of fungi

Clathrospora is a genus of fungi in the family Diademaceae. The widespread genus contained five species in 2008, the genus increased to 20 species by 2023.

== Species ==
As accepted by Species Fungorum;

- Clathrospora baccata (Ellis) Lar.N. Vassiljeva (1998)
- Clathrospora bakeri Wehm. (1954)
- Clathrospora behnitziensis Kirschst. (1939)
- Clathrospora constricta Maire (1906)
- Clathrospora diplospora (Ellis & Everh.) Sacc. & Traverso (1910)
- Clathrospora elynae Rabenh. (1857)
- Clathrospora heterospora (De Not.) Wehm. (1961)
- Clathrospora juncicola (Ellis & Everh.) Wehm. (1954)
- Clathrospora microspora Wehm. (1954)
- Clathrospora muscicola Racov. (1959)
- Clathrospora permunda (Cooke) Berl. (1888)
- Clathrospora pteridis Lind (1915)
- Clathrospora recava Shoemaker & C.E. Babc. (1992)
- Clathrospora revelstokensis Shoemaker & C.E. Babc. (1992)
- Clathrospora simmonsii Wehm. (1952)
- Clathrospora stipae Traverso (1912)
- Clathrospora trifidi (Wehm.) Shoemaker & C.E. Babc. (1992)
- Clathrospora triseptata Wehm. (1954)
- Clathrospora turkestanica Domashova (1960)
- Clathrospora xerophila Curzi & Barbaini (1927)

Former species;

- C. aurea (Ellis) Berl. (1896) = Ombrophila aurea, Gelatinodiscaceae
- C. chartarum (Fuckel) O.E. Erikss. (1967) = Platysporoides chartarum, Pleosporaceae
- C. cookei Wehm. (1952) = Platysporoides cookei, Pleosporaceae
- C. dacotensis (Rehm) Höhn. (1919) = Pleospora dakotensis, Pleosporaceae
- C. deflectens (P. Karst.) O.E. Erikss. (1967) = Platysporoides deflectens, Pleosporaceae
- C. donacis Berl. (1888) = Platysporoides donacis, Pleosporaceae
- C. heterospora var. simmonsii (Wehm.) Wehm. (1961) = Clathrospora simmonsii
- C. macrospora Nannf. (1931) = Pyrenophora macrospora, Pleosporaceae
- C. multiseptata E. Müll. (1951) = Platysporoides multiseptata, Pleosporaceae
- C. patriniae Nann. (1929) = Platysporoides patriniae, Pleosporaceae
- C. pentamera (P. Karst.) Berl. (1888) = Graphyllium pentamerum, Diademaceae
- C. planispora (Ellis) Berl. (1888) = Graphyllium planispora, Diademaceae
- C. platyspora (Sacc.) Berl. (1888) = Graphyllium pentamerum, Diademaceae
- C. platysporioides M.L. Farr & Horner (1968) = Comoclathris platysporioides, Diademaceae
- C. punctiformis (Niessl) Berl. (1888) = Platysporoides punctiformis, Pleosporaceae
- C. punctiformis var. alpina Rehm (1906) = Platysporoides punctiformis, Pleosporaceae
- C. pyrenophoroides (Sacc.) Berl. (1888) = Comoclathris pyrenophoroides, Diademaceae
- C. quadriseptata (Cooke & Harkn.) Berl. (1896) = Comoclathris quadriseptata, Diademaceae
- C. scirpicola (DC.) Höhn. (1920) = Pleospora scirpicola, Pleosporaceae
- C. tirolensis Rehm ex O.E. Erikss. (1967) = Platysporoides tirolensis, Pleosporaceae
- C. triseptata var. trifidi Wehm. (1961) = Clathrospora trifidi
- C. typhicola (Cooke) Höhn. (1918) = Comoclathris typhicola, Diademaceae
- C. verruculosa O.E. Erikss. (1967) = Comoclathris verruculosa, Diademaceae
