= Pseudoyuconia =

Scientific classification
- Domain: Eukaryota
- Kingdom: Fungi
- Division: Ascomycota
- Class: Dothideomycetes
- Order: Pleosporales
- Family: Pleosporaceae
- Genus: Pseudoyuconia; Rabenh. ex Ces. & De Not.

Type species
- Pseudoyuconia thalictri (G. Winter) Lar.N. Vassiljeva

Genus of fungi

Pseudoyuconia is a genus of fungi in the family Pleosporaceae. This is a monotypic genus, containing the single species Pseudoyuconia thalictri.
