= Alternaria penicillata =

Scientific classification
- Kingdom: Fungi
- Division: Ascomycota
- Class: Dothideomycetes
- Order: Pleosporales
- Family: Pleosporaceae
- Genus: Alternaria
- Species: A. penicillata

Binomial name
- Alternaria penicillata (Corda) Woudenb. & Crous

Synonyms
- Brachycladium penicillatum Corda, Icon. fung. (Prague) 2: 14 (1838); Dendryphion penicillatum (Corda) Fr., Summa veg. Scand., Sectio Post. (Stockholm): 504 (1849); Cucurbitaria papaveracea De Not., Hedwigia 4: 19 (1865); Pleospora papaveracea (De Not.) Sacc., Syll. fung. (Abellini) 2: 243 (1883); Crivellia papaveracea (De Not.) Shoemaker & Inderb., in Inderbitzin, Shoemaker, O'Neill, Turgeon & Berbee, Can. J. Bot. 84(8): 1308 (2006); Dendryphion penicillatum var. sclerotiale M.-E. Meffert, Z. ParasitKde 14(5): 462 (1950)

Genus of fungi

Alternaria penicillata is a species of fungi in the family Pleosporaceae, which causes leaf blight of opium poppy. The fungus is found in Europe, Australia, India, Japan, Nepal, Pakistan, South Africa, Turkey, USA and Zambia.

It was formerly Crivellia papaveracea in the monotypic genus Crivellia. With DNA analyses showing that it was related to Alternaria brassicicola (Schw.) Wiltshire, Alternaria japonica Yoshii, and Ulocladium alternariae (Cooke) Simmons.

Genus Crivellia was named after mycologist Paolo Giuseppe Crivelli (fl. 1981).

It was found in Russia and Ukraine.

In 2013, a new DNA study was carried out and reclassified former genera; Allewia, Brachycladium, Chalastospora, Chmelia, Crivellia, Embellisia, Lewia, Nimbya, Sinomyces, Teretispora, Ulocladium, Undifilum and Ybotromyces as synonymy with genus Alternaria. As accepted by Wijayawardene et al. 2020.

== "Agent Green" in Colombia ==
In 2000, the government of Colombia proposed dispersing strains of Crivellia and another fungus, Fusarium oxysporum, also known as Agent Green, as a biological weapon to forcibly eradicate coca and other illegal crops. The weaponized strains were developed by the US government, who had conditioned their approval of Plan Colombia on the use of this weapon, but ultimately withdraw that condition. In February 2001, the EU Parliament also issued a declaration specifically against the use of these biological agents in warfare.
