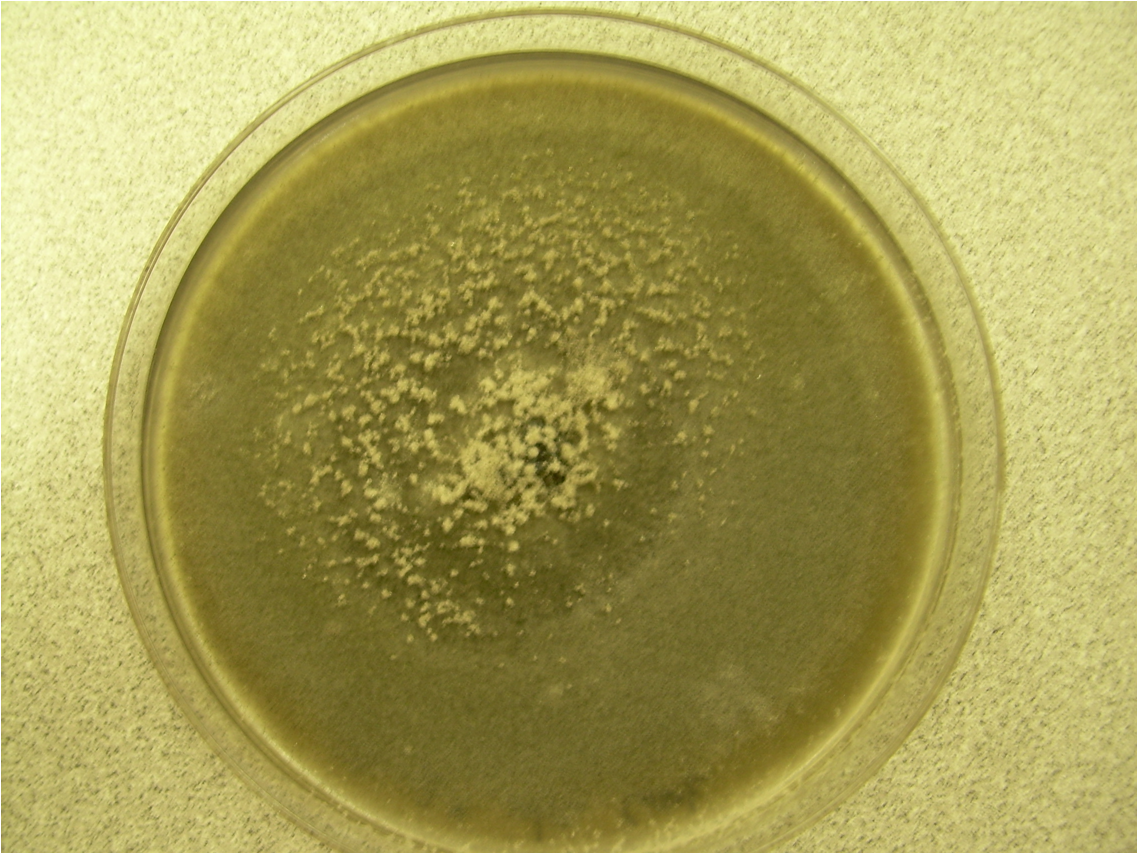

Scientific classification
- Kingdom: Fungi
- Division: Ascomycota
- Class: Dothideomycetes
- Order: Pleosporales
- Family: Pleosporaceae
- Genus: Ulocladium
- Species: U. atrum

Binomial name
- Ulocladium atrum (Preuss) Sacc., (1886)

Synonyms
- Stemphylium atrum

= Ulocladium atrum =

Species of fungus

Ulocladium atrum is a fungal saprophyte.

U. atrum is used to control Botrytis cinerea, a fungal pathogen (gray mold) of grapes and other fruit.

The species has also been found as a cause of keratitis, inflammation of the cornea.
