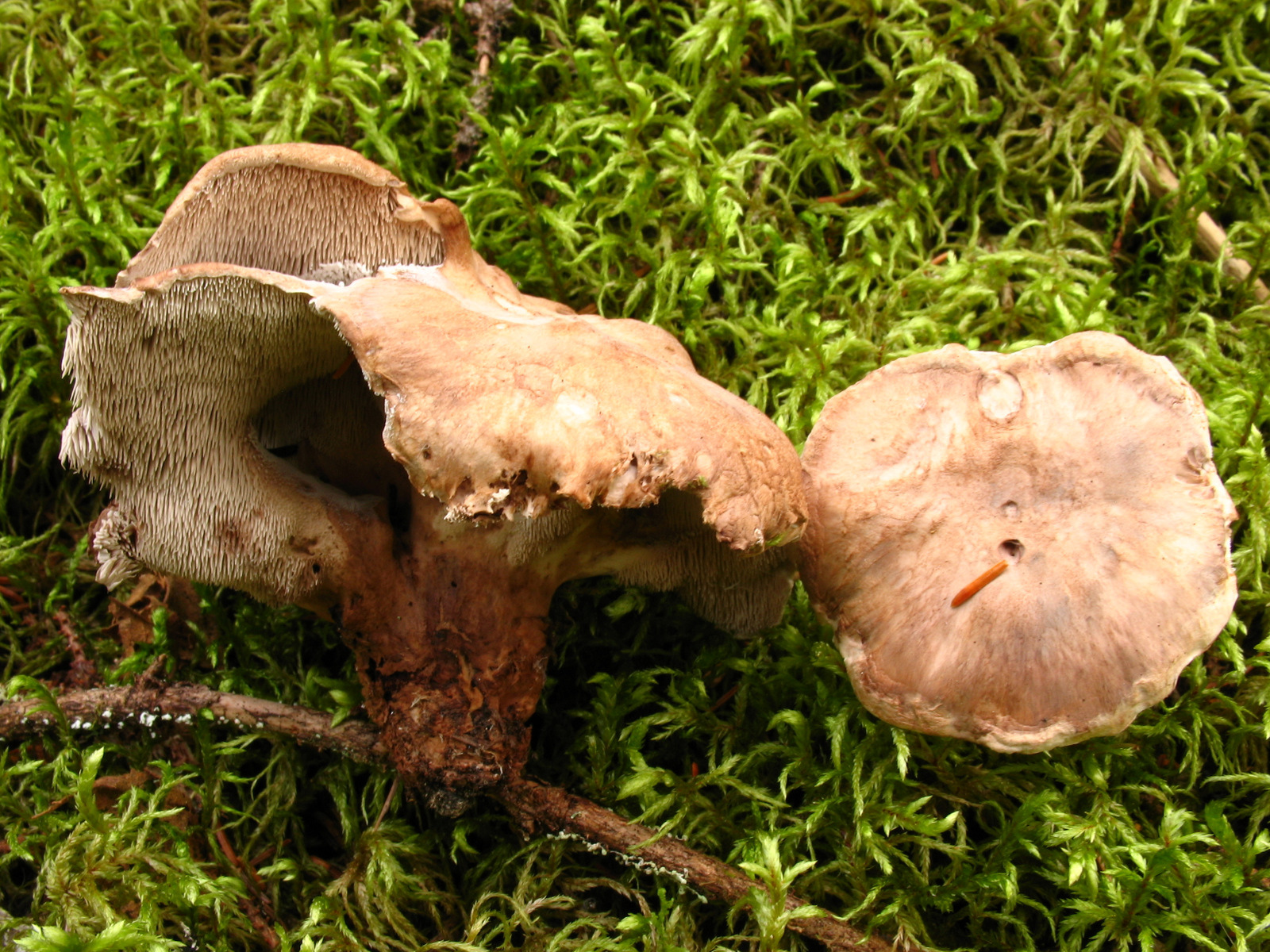

Scientific classification
- Kingdom: Fungi
- Division: Basidiomycota
- Class: Agaricomycetes
- Order: Thelephorales
- Family: Bankeraceae
- Genus: Sarcodon
- Species: S. stereosarcinon

Binomial name
- Sarcodon stereosarcinon Wehm. (1940)

Synonyms
- Hydnum stereosarcinon (Wehm.) K.A.Harrison (1961); Hydnellum stereosarcinon (Wehm.) Stalpers (1993); Hydnum brevipes (Coker) Snell (1945); Sarcodon brevipes Coker (1959)

= Sarcodon stereosarcinon =

Species of fungus

Sarcodon stereosarcinon is a species of tooth fungus in the family Bankeraceae. Found in North America, it was described as new to science in 1940 by mycologist Lewis Edgar Wehmeyer, who found the original collections in Nova Scotia, Canada.
