= Lewis Edgar Wehmeyer =

American botanist and mycologist

Lewis Edgar Wehmeyer (January 1, 1897, Quincy, Illinois – September 11, 1971, Ann Arbor, Michigan) was an American botanist and mycologist. He gained an international reputation as an expert on the genera Pleospora and Pyrenophora.

== Biography ==
After graduating in 1914 from Quincy High School, Lewis E. Wehmeyer matriculated in 1916 at the University of Michigan. His academic education was delayed by a year spent in the U.S. Army Corps of Engineers during WW I. At the University of Michigan he graduated with a B.S. in forestry in 1921 and then matriculated in the department of botany. He held the Emmac J. Cole Fellowship for three years and graduated in 1925 with a Ph.D. His thesis Biologic and phylogenetic study of the stromatic Sphaeriales was supervised by Calvin Henry Kauffman (1869–1931) As a postdoc Wehmeyer held a National Research Council Fellowship at Harvard University for three years. As a postdoc he collected fungi in Nova Scotia and in September 1927 in Truro, Nova Scotia married Florence Elaine Prince (called Elaine Prince). She was born in Truro on 22 March 1903.

At the University of Michigan, Wehmeyer was an instructor from 1928 to 1931, an assistant professor from 1931 to 1937, an associate professor from 1937 to 1947, and a full professor from 1947 to 1968, when he retired as professor emeritus. He collected many specimens of Pleospora in Wyoming. He was a consultant for mycological specialists in Argentina, Sweden, England, and Canada. His most important work is perhaps his 4th book A world monograph of the genus Pleospora and its segregates, based upon his collection of about 1,200 specimens, of which about 400 are type specimens.

He was elected in 1931 a Fellow of the American Association for the Advancement of Science.

In 1981, a bequest was made in the name of Lewis E. Wehmeyer and Elaine Prince Wehmeyer (1903-1979) for an endowment of a professorial chair in mycology at the University of Michigan. The genus Wehmeyera is named in his honor.

== Selected publications ==
- Wehmeyer, Lewis E. (1923). "The imperfect stage of some higher Pyrenomycetes obtained in culture". Papers of the Michigan Academy of Science, Arts, and Letters (1923 Meeting). 3: 245–266.
- —— (1926). "A Biologic and Phylogenetic Study of the Stromatic Sphaeriales". American Journal of Botany. 13 (10): 575–645. Bibcode:1926AmJB...13..575W. doi:10.1002/j.1537-2197.1926.tb05903.x. hdl:2027/mdp.39015069521253. JSTOR 2435473.
- —— (1933). "The British species of the genus Diaporthe Nits. and its segregates" (PDF). Trans Br Mycol Soc. 17 (4): 237–295. doi:10.1016/S0007-1536(33)80010-6.
- —— (1946). "Studies on Some Fungi from Northwestern Wyoming. II. Fungi Imperfecti". Mycologia. 38 (3): 306–330. doi:10.1080/00275514.1946.12024060.
- —— (1947). "Studies on Some Fungi from Northwestern Wyoming. IV. Miscellaneous". Mycologia. 39 (4): 463–478. doi:10.1080/00275514.1947.12017628.
- —— (1954). "Perithecial Development in Pleospora trichostoma". Botanical Gazette. 115 (4): 297–310. doi:10.1086/335829. S2CID 86793733.
- —— (1963). "Some Himalayan Ascomycetes of the Punjab and Kashmir". Mycologia. 55 (3): 309–336. doi:10.1080/00275514.1963.12018026.
- —— (1964). "Some Fungi Imperfecti of the Punjab and Kashmir". Mycologia. 56: 29–52. doi:10.1080/00275514.1964.12018080.

=== Books and monographs ===
- Wehmeyer, Lewis E. (1933). The genus Diaporthe Nitschke and its segregates. University of Michigan studies. Scientific series. Vol. IX. Ann Arbor: University of Michigan Press. LCCN 34003518. OCLC 10373481.
  - 2021 reprint. Creative Media Partners, LLC. 9 September 2021. ISBN 978-1013966910.
- —— (1941). A revision of Melanconis, Pseudovalsa, Prosthecium, and Titania. University of Michigan studies. Scientific series, vol. XIV. Ann Arbor: University of Michigan Press. LCCN 41052932. OCLC 4736127.
  - A revision of Melanconis, Pseudovalsa, Prosthecium, and Titania. Bibliotheca Mycologica, Band 41. Lehre, Germany: J. Cramer. 1973. LCCN 74181761; Reprint of the 1941 edition published by the University of Michigan Press, Ann Arbor
- —— (1950). The fungi of New Brunswick, Nova Scotia, and Prince Edward Island. Ottawa: National Research Council of Canada. doi:10.4224/21273347. LCCN 58048188.
- —— (1961). A world monograph of the genus Pleospora and its segregates. Ann Arbor: University of Michigan Press. LCCN 61063564.
  - Wehmeyer, Lewis Edgar (20 April 2013). 2013 reprint. Literary Licensing, LLC. ISBN 978-1258680824.
- —— (1975). The Pyrenomycetous fungi. Lehre, Germany: J. Cramer for the New York Botanical Garden, in collaboration with the Mycological Society of America. ISBN 9783768209670; edited by Richard T. Hanlin from posthumous papers of Lewis E. Wehmeyer. (Pyrenomycete is a synonym for sordariomycete, defined as any fungus belonging to the class Sordariomycetes.)

== See also ==
- Sarcodon stereosarcinon
