= West Norfolk and Lynn Hospital =

Former hospital in King's Lynn, England

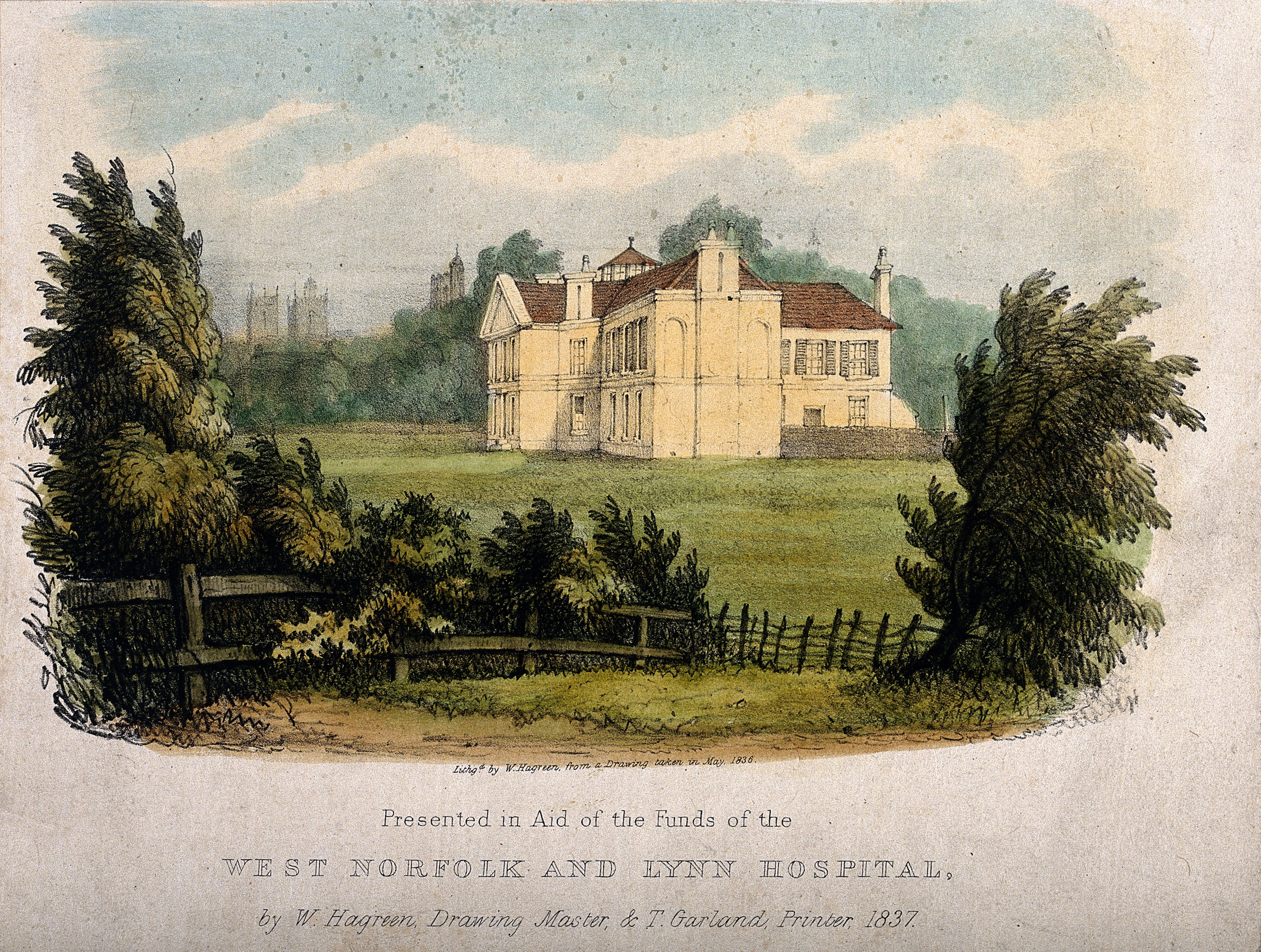
West Norfolk and Lynn Hospital, Norfolk, England, depicted in 1836

The West Norfolk and Lynn Hospital (later the West Norfolk and King's Lynn Hospital) was an English hospital in King's Lynn, Norfolk, founded in 1835. It was closed in 1980.

== History ==
A meeting on 13 October 1833 in King's Lynn of local gentry, chaired by MP Sir W. H. B. Ffolkes, led to the hospital's construction and opening in 1835 at a cost of more than £2,000. An 1845 guide to the area described it as a "spacious and handsome building of white brick" which had accommodations for about 40 patients; the Marquess of Cholmondeley was the president of the hospital.

The building was expanded in 1848 and again in 1852. A major expansion in the early 1930s was formally opened by Queen Mary on 9 February 1935.

On being taken over by the National Health Service in 1948, the hospital was classified as an acute care facility. The hospital was closed in 1980 after the opening of Queen Elizabeth Hospital, King's Lynn and the building was demolished in 1988.

== Notable persons connected with the hospital ==
- George Cholmondeley, 2nd Marquess of Cholmondeley (1792-1870), MP and peer, served as board president
- Daniel Gurney (1791-1880), banker and antiquary; a backer and long-time board member of the hospital
- Emily MacManus (1888-1978), president of the Royal College of Nursing, worked at the hospital early in her career
- Charles Bagge Plowright (1849-1910), surgeon and mycologist who trained and worked at the hospital
- Roger Taylor (b. 1949), drummer for Queen, was born at the hospital
