= Extrawettsteinina =

Scientific classification
- Domain: Eukaryota
- Kingdom: Fungi
- Division: Ascomycota
- Class: Dothideomycetes
- Order: Pleosporales
- Family: Pleosporaceae
- Genus: Extrawettsteinina; M.E. Barr

Genus of fungi

Extrawettsteinina is a genus of fungi in the family Pleosporaceae.

It contains 2 species;

- Extrawettsteinina andromedae (Auersw.) M.E.Barr
- Extrawettsteinina pinastri M.E.Barr
