= Diadema (fungus) =

Scientific classification
- Domain: Eukaryota
- Kingdom: Fungi
- Division: Ascomycota
- Class: Dothideomycetes
- Order: Pleosporales
- Family: Diademaceae
- Genus: Diadema; Shoemaker & C.E. Babc.

Type species
- Diadema tetramerum Shoemaker & C.E. Babc.

Genus of fungi

Diadema is a genus of fungi in the family Diademaceae.

== Species ==
As accepted by Species Fungorum;

- Diadema acutum Shoemaker & C.E. Babc. (1989)
- Diadema ahmadii Kaz. Tanaka & S.H. Iqbal (2010)
- Diadema cinctum Shoemaker & C.E. Babc. (1989)
- Diadema curtum Shoemaker & C.E. Babc. (1989)
- Diadema hexamerum Shoemaker & C.E. Babc. (1989)
- Diadema obtusum Shoemaker & C.E. Babc. (1989)
- Diadema sieversiae (Peck) Huhndorf (1992)
- Diadema tetramerum Shoemaker & C.E. Babc. (1989)
