= Pleospora theae =

Scientific classification
- Domain: Eukaryota
- Kingdom: Fungi
- Division: Ascomycota
- Class: Dothideomycetes
- Order: Pleosporales
- Family: Pleosporaceae
- Genus: Pleospora
- Species: P. theae

Binomial name
- Pleospora theae Speschnew, 1904

Species of fungal plant pathogen

Pleospora theae is a species of fungus in the family Pleosporaceae. It is a plant pathogen that infects the leaves of tea plants (Camellia sinensis).

== See also ==
- List of tea diseases
