= Platysporoides =

Scientific classification
- Domain: Eukaryota
- Kingdom: Fungi
- Division: Ascomycota
- Class: Dothideomycetes
- Order: Pleosporales
- Family: Pleosporaceae
- Genus: Platysporoides (Wehm.) Shoemaker & C.E. Babc.

Type species
- Platysporoides chartarum (Fuckel) Shoemaker & C.E. Babc.

Genus of fungi

Platysporoides is a genus of fungi in the family Pleosporaceae.

== Species ==
Extant species:

- Platysporoides chartarum (Fuckel) Shoemaker & C.E.Babc.
- Platysporoides cookei (Wehm.) Shoemaker & C.E.Babc.
- Platysporoides crandallii Shoemaker & C.E.Babc.
- Platysporoides deflectens (P.Karst.) Shoemaker & C.E.Babc.
- Platysporoides donacis (Berl.) Shoemaker & C.E.Babc.
- Platysporoides multiseptata (E.Müll.) Shoemaker & C.E.Babc.
- Platysporoides patriniae (Nann.) Shoemaker & C.E.Babc.
- Platysporoides punctiformis (Niessl) Shoemaker & C.E.Babc.
- Platysporoides tirolensis (Rehm ex O.E.Erikss.) Shoemaker & C.E.Babc.
- Platysporoides togwotiensis (Wehm.) Shoemaker & C.E.Babc.
- Platysporoides ulgaris (Wehm.) Shoemaker & C.E.Babc.
- Platysporoides vulgaris (Wehm.) Shoemaker & C.E.Babc.
