= William Phillips (botanist) =

British botanist, mycologist and lichenologist (1822–1905)

William Phillips (4 May 1822 – 23 October 1905) was a Wales-born English mycologist, botanist, and antiquary.

== Life ==
Born at Presteign in Radnorshire, on 4 May 1822, he was fourth son in a family of ten children of Thomas Phillips and Elizabeth, daughter of James Cross. After receiving some education at a school at Presteign, Phillips was apprenticed to his elder brother James, a tailor, in High Street, Shrewsbury, with whom and another brother, Edward, he went in due course into partnership. In 1859 he joined the Shrewsbury volunteers, and became a colour-sergeant.

Phillips was elected a fellow of the Linnean Society in 1875, and was fellow of the Society of Antiquaries of London. He became a borough magistrate in 1886, and was presented with the freedom of the borough on 17 August 1903. He died of heart-disease at his residence in Canonbury, Shrewsbury, on 23 October 1905, aged 83, and was buried in the general cemetery in Longden Road, Shrewsbury.

== Botanist ==
Phillips took up botany about 1861 at the suggestion of his friend William Allport Leighton the lichenologist. Beginning with flowering plants, Phillips turned to fungi about 1869, first to the Hymenomycetes and afterwards mainly to the Discomycetes, though other groups of cryptogams were also among his interests. Between 1873 and 1891, with Charles Bagge Plowright, he contributed a series of notes on New and rare British Fungi to Grevillea, and between 1874 and 1881 he issued an exsiccata with sets of specimens entitled Elvellacei Britannici. In 1878 he helped to found, and formed the council of, the Shropshire Archæological and Natural History Society, and in its Transactions (vol. i.) appeared his paper on the ferns and fern-allies of Shropshire, which he had printed privately in 1877; other papers followed in the Transactions.

In 1878 Phillips published a Guide to the Botany of Shrewsbury, and before his death completed for the Victoria County History an account of the botany of the county. In 1887 he published his major work, A Manual of the British Discomycetes, in the International Scientific series (with twelve plates drawn by himself).

== Antiquarian ==
In later life Phillips engaged in archæological research, and made studies of the earthworks, castles, and moated houses of Shropshire. Many of his findings were published in Transactions of the Shropshire Archæological Society, Salopian Shreds and Patches, Bye-Gones, or Shropshire Notes and Queries, which he edited, and to a great extent wrote, towards the close of his life.

The Ottley Papers, relating to the English Civil War, which he edited for the Shropshire Society between 1893 and 1898, form a complete county history for the period; and he edited the first part of John Brickdale Blakeway's Topographical History of Shrewsbury. He took part in the preservation of the remains of Uriconium; helped to arrange the borough records of Shrewsbury, and to prepare the calendar (1896); edited the Quarter Sessions Rolls of Shropshire from 1652 to 1659, and transcribed the parish registers of Battlefield (2 vols. 1899-1900) and Stirchley (1905) for the Shropshire Parish Register Society.

In 1896 Phillips, a Methodist and at one time a local preacher, published Early Methodism in Shropshire.

== Family ==
Phillips married in 1846 Sarah Ann, daughter of Thomas Hitchins of Shrewsbury, who died in 1895. Two sons and two daughters survived him.

== Legacy ==
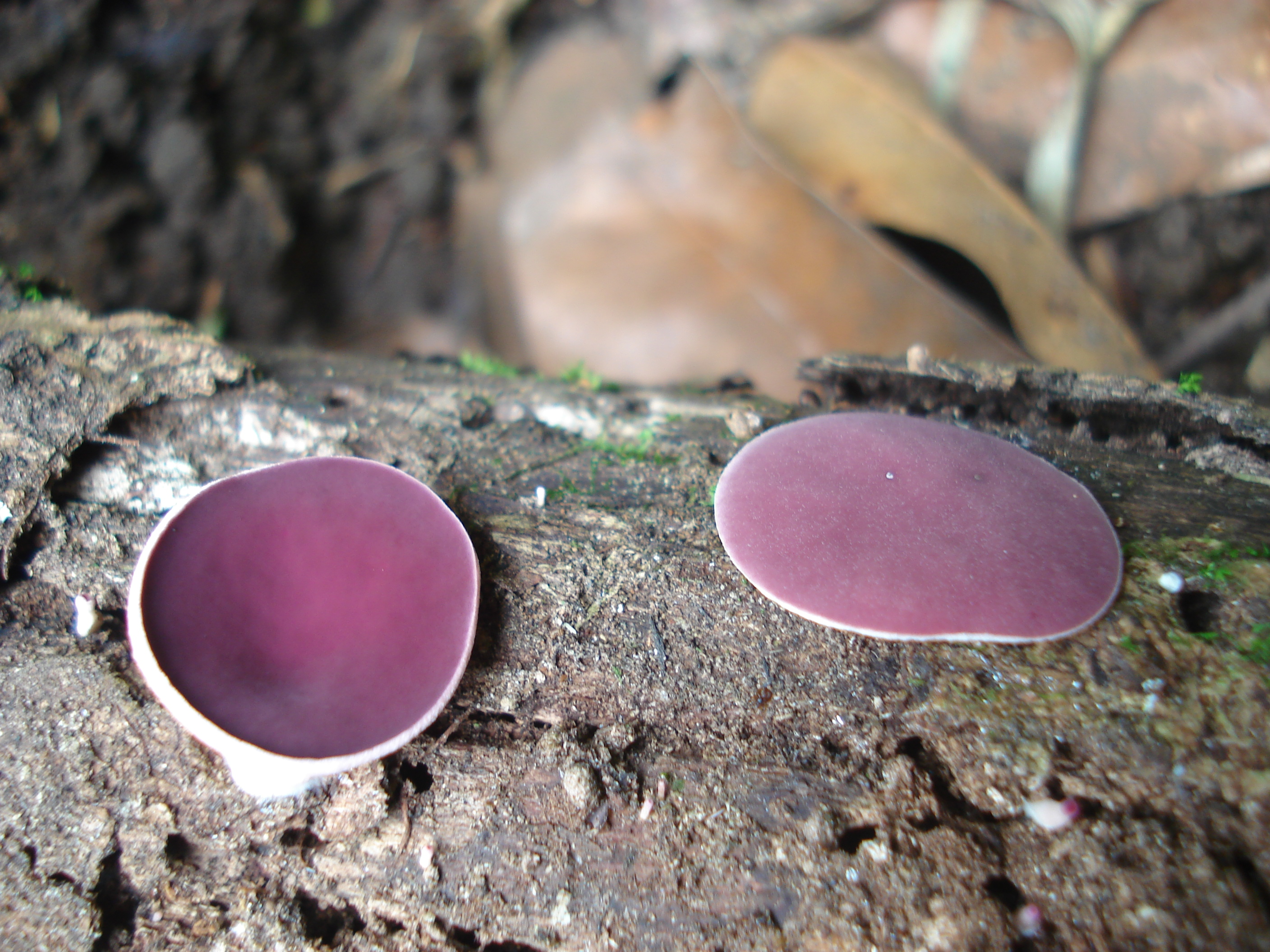
Phillipsia domingensis

Miles Joseph Berkeley dedicated to Phillips a genus of fungi under the name Phillipsia.

Phillips was involved in the conversion of the Shrewsbury Free School buildings into Shrewsbury Library (from 1882), and he became its curator of botany. Manuscript volumes by him on antiquarian subjects were preserved there. His botanical manuscripts and drawings, including his correspondence with botanists at home and abroad, were purchased at his death for the botanical department of the British Museum.

== Notes ==
Attribution

This article incorporates text from a publication now in the public domain: Lee, Sidney, ed. (1912). "Phillips, William". Dictionary of National Biography (2nd supplement). Vol. 3. London: Smith, Elder & Co.
