= Dichotomophthora =

Scientific classification
- Domain: Eukaryota
- Kingdom: Fungi
- Division: Ascomycota
- Class: Dothideomycetes
- Order: Pleosporales
- Family: Pleosporaceae
- Genus: Dichotomophthora; Mehrl. & Fitzp. ex M.B.Ellis, 1971

Genus of fungi

Dichotomophthora is a genus of fungi belonging to the family Pleosporaceae.

== Species ==
As accepted by Species Fungorum;

- Dichotomophthora basellae Hern.-Restr., Cheew. & Crous (2018)
- Dichotomophthora brunnea Hern.-Restr. & Crous (2018)
- Dichotomophthora cactacearum Da Ponte & F.O. Freire (1972)
- Dichotomophthora lutea (Routien) de Hoog & Oorschot (1983)
- Dichotomophthora portulacae Mehrl. & Fitzp. ex M.B. Ellis (1971)

Former species, Dichotomophthora portulacae var. longispora R.F. Castañeda (1988) = Dichotomophthora portulacae
