= Zeuctomorpha =

Scientific classification
- Kingdom: Fungi
- Division: Ascomycota
- Class: Dothideomycetes
- Order: Pleosporales
- Family: Pleosporaceae
- Genus: Zeuctomorpha; Sivan., P.M. Kirk & Govindu

Type species
- Zeuctomorpha arecae P.M. Kirk & Govindu

Genus of fungi

Zeuctomorpha is a genus of fungi in the family Pleosporaceae. This is a monotypic genus, containing the single species Zeuctomorpha arecae.
