= Diademosa =

Scientific classification
- Kingdom: Fungi
- Division: Ascomycota
- Class: Dothideomycetes
- Order: Pleosporales
- Family: Diademaceae
- Genus: Diademosa; Shoemaker & C.E. Babc.

Type species
- Diademosa californiana (M.E. Barr) Shoemaker & C.E. Babc.

Genus of fungi

Diademosa is a genus of fungi in the family Diademaceae.

== Species ==
As accepted by Species Fungorum;

- Diademosa californiana (M.E. Barr) Shoemaker & C.E. Babc. (1992)
- Diademosa foliicola M.E. Barr & Rogerson (1999)
- Diademosa ranunculi (Rostr.) Y.M. Ahn & Shearer (1998)
- Diademosa sabulosa Checa & M.E. Barr (1999)
