= Diademaceae =

Scientific classification
- Kingdom: Fungi
- Division: Ascomycota
- Class: Dothideomycetes
- Order: Pleosporales
- Family: Diademaceae; Shoemaker & C.E. Babc. (1992)

Type species
- Diadema Shoemaker & C.E. Babc.

Family of fungi

The Diademaceae are a family of fungi in the order Pleosporales. Taxa are widespread, especially in temperate regions, and are parasitic or saprobic in stem and leaves.

== Genera ==
- Clathrospora (with 20 species)
- Comoclathris (with 38 species)
- Diadema (with 8 species)
- Diademosa (with 4 species)
- Graphyllium (with 10 species)
