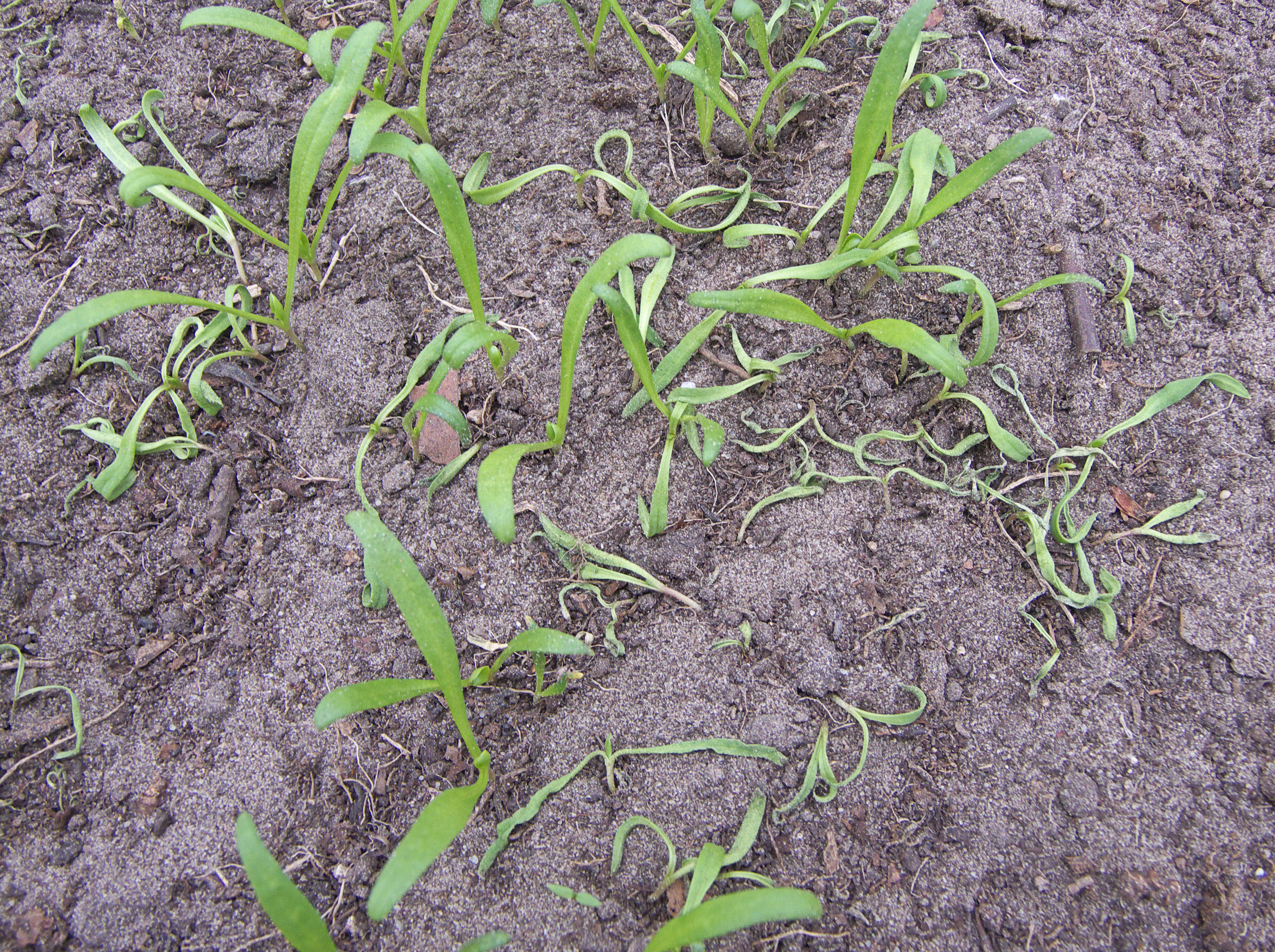
- Pleospora betae spinach

Scientific classification
- Domain: Eukaryota
- Kingdom: Fungi
- Division: Ascomycota
- Class: Dothideomycetes
- Order: Pleosporales
- Family: Pleosporaceae
- Genus: Pleospora; Rabenh. ex Ces. & De Not.

Type species
- Pleospora herbarum (Pers.) Rabenh. (1857)

= Pleospora =

Genus of fungi

Pleospora is a genus of ascomycete fungi. This genus was originally described by Gottlob Ludwig Rabenhorst in 1857 and was revised by Wehmeyer and Müller. There was an estimated 63 species in 2008. As of 8 August 2023, the GBIF lists up to 440 species, while Species Fungorum lists about 375 species.

== Selected species ==
A selected few species are shown here;

- Pleospora alfalfae
- Pleospora allii, Stemphylium leaf blight
- Pleospora ambigua
- Pleospora bardanae Niessl 1876
- Pleospora betae now Neocamarosporium betae
- Pleospora bjoerlingii
- Pleospora eturmiuna
- Pleospora gaudefroyi, Patouillard, now in genus Decorospora
- Pleospora gigaspora
- Pleospora gracilariae
- Pleospora halophila
- Pleospora herbarum
- Pleospora iqbalii
- Pleospora lamnaria
- Pleospora leptosphaerulinoides
- Pleospora lycopersici
- Pleospora mullerii
- Pleospora paludiscirpi
- Pleospora papaveracea, possible biocontrol for oriental poppy, now in genus Crivellia.
- Pleospora pelagica
- Pleospora pelvetiae
- Pleospora rubicunda
- Pleospora rudis
- Pleospora sedicola
- Pleospora shepherdiae, attacks dead twigs of Crataegus
- Pleospora spartinae
- Pleospora theae
- Pleospora tomatonis
- Pleospora triglochinicola
- Pleospora welwitschiae

== Other sources ==
- S.T. Tilak Two new species of Pleospora from India
- Spp
