= Alternaria consortialis =

Scientific classification
- Kingdom: Fungi
- Division: Ascomycota
- Class: Dothideomycetes
- Order: Pleosporales
- Family: Pleosporaceae
- Genus: Alternaria
- Species: A. consortialis

Binomial name
- Alternaria consortialis (Thüm.) E.G. Simmons, (1967)

Synonyms
- Alternaria consortialis var. levis Gambogi, Ann. Ist. Super. Forest. Naz. Firenze 18: 834 (1966); Macrosporium consortiale Thüm., Herb. myc. oeconom., Fasc. 9: no. 450 (1876); Pseudostemphylium consortiale (Thüm.) Subram., Curr. Sci. 30: 423 (1961); Stemphylium consortiale (Thüm.) J.W. Groves & Skolko, Canadian Journal of Research, Section C: 196 (1944); Stemphylium consortiale var. minor (Ruehle) Neerg., Danish species of Alternaria & Stemphylium: 323 (1945); Stemphylium congestum var. minor Ruehle, Mycologia 22(6): 308 (1930); Stemphylium ilicis Tengwall, Meded. Phytopath. Labor. Willie Commelin Scholten Baarn 6: 44 (1924); Stemphylium ilicis var. minor (Ruehle) Neerg., Danish species of Alternaria & Stemphylium: 323 (1945); Ulocladium consortiale (Thüm.) E.G. Simmons, Mycologia 59(1): 84 (1967)

Species of fungus

Alternaria consortialis is a fungal plant pathogen, infecting tomatoes and cucurbits. It also causes disease in caraway seedlings. It was found on fruits and vegetables in Saudi Arabia.
