= Decorospora =

Cochliobolus

Scientific classification
- Domain: Eukaryota
- Kingdom: Fungi
- Division: Ascomycota
- Class: Dothideomycetes
- Order: Pleosporales
- Family: Pleosporaceae
- Genus: Decorospora (Pat.) Inderb., Kohlm. & Volkm.-Kohlm.

Type species
- Decorospora gaudefroyi (Pat.) Inderb., Kohlm. & Volkm.-Kohlm.

Synonyms
- Pleospora gaudefroyi Pat., Tab. analyt. Fung. (Paris) 2(6): 40 (fig. 602) (1886); Pleospora salicorniae Jaap, Verh. bot. Ver. Prov. Brandenb. 49: 16 (1907); Diplodia salicorniae Jaap, Verh. bot. Ver. Prov. Brandenb. 49: 16 (1907); Diplodina salicorniae (Jaap) Sacc., in Saccardo & Trotter, Syll. fung. (Abellini) 22(2): 1044 (1913); Pleospora herbarum var. salicorniae Jaap, Annls mycol. 14(1/2): 17 (1916)

Genus of fungi

Decorospora is a genus of fungus. Currently, it is monotypic, and contains only the marine species, Decorospora gaudefroyi.
