= Pleoseptum =

Scientific classification
- Kingdom: Fungi
- Division: Ascomycota
- Class: Dothideomycetes
- Order: Pleosporales
- Family: Leptosphaeriaceae
- Genus: Pleoseptum; A.W.Ramaley & M.E.Barr (1995)

Type species
- Pleoseptum yuccaesedum A.W.Ramaley & M.E.Barr (1995)

Genus of fungi

Pleoseptum is a genus of fungi in the family Phaeosphaeriaceae. This is a monotypic genus, containing the single species Pleoseptum yuccaesedum.
