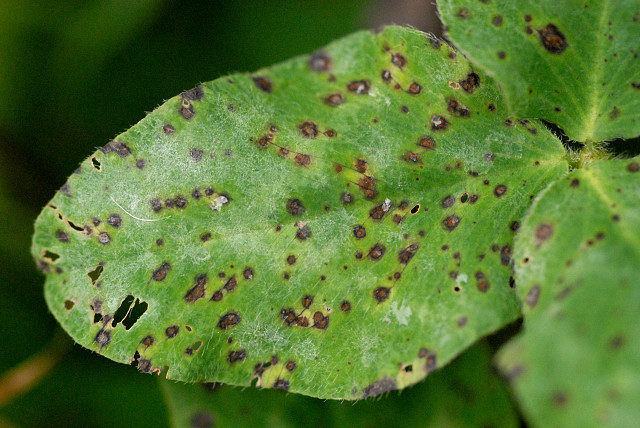
- Stemphylium sarciniforme found in Commanster, Belgium

Scientific classification
- Domain: Eukaryota
- Kingdom: Fungi
- Division: Ascomycota
- Class: Dothideomycetes
- Order: Pleosporales
- Family: Pleosporaceae
- Genus: Stemphylium; Wallr. 1833

Species
- See text

= Stemphylium =

Genus of fungi

Stemphylium is a genus of fungal plant pathogen.

== Species ==
As accepted by Species Fungorum;

- Stemphylium allii Oudem. (1902)
- Stemphylium allii-cepae X.G. Zhang & T.Y. Zhang (2003)
- Stemphylium amaranthi Y.F. Pei & X.G. Zhang (2009)
- Stemphylium anomalum Gonz. Frag. (1917)
- Stemphylium armeriae (Corda) Woudenb. & Crous (2017)
- Stemphylium arnyi Reifschn. (1979)
- Stemphylium artemisiae Brahmanage, Camporesi & K.D. Hyde (2020)
- Stemphylium astragali (Yoshii) W. Yamam. (1960)
- Stemphylium basellae B.J. Li, Y.F. Zhou & Y.L. Guo (2012)
- Stemphylium berlesii Oudem. (1902)
- Stemphylium beticola Woudenb. & Hanse (2016)
- Stemphylium bizarrum Viégas (1961)
- Stemphylium bolickii Sobers & C.P. Seym. (1963)
- Stemphylium botryosum Wallr. (1833)
- Stemphylium bubakii E.G. Simmons (2002)
- Stemphylium butyri F. Patt. (1900)
- Stemphylium callistephi K.F. Baker & L.H. Davis (1950)
- Stemphylium canadense Woudenb. & Crous (2017)
- Stemphylium capsici Yong Wang bis & X.G. Zhang (2006)
- Stemphylium carpobroti Crous (2020)
- Stemphylium celosiae (Tassi) Bremer et al. (1952)
- Stemphylium chisha Y. Nisik. & Hiura ex Y. Nisik. (1960)
- Stemphylium chrysanthemicola Woudenb. & Crous (2017)
- Stemphylium cirsii (Lindau) E.G. Simmons (1997)
- Stemphylium citri F. Patt. & Charles (1910)
- Stemphylium clematidis Wanas., Camporesi & K.D. Hyde (2020)
- Stemphylium codii Zeller (1918)
- Stemphylium congestum G.A. Newton (1928)
- Stemphylium crataegi (Ellis & Everh.) Höhn. (1929)
- Stemphylium cucumis Y.F. Pei & X.G. Zhang (2011)
- Stemphylium cucurbitacearum Osner (1918)
- Stemphylium dendriticum Sousa da Câmara (1930)
- Stemphylium descurainiae X.G. Zhang & T.Y. Zhang (2007)
- Stemphylium dianthi Brahamanage, Bulgakov & K.D. Hyde (2019)
- Stemphylium dichroum Petr. (1950)
- Stemphylium drummondii Nirenberg & Plate (1983)
- Stemphylium elasticae F. Patt. (1900)
- Stemphylium ericoctonum A. Braun & de Bary (1853)
- Stemphylium eturmiunum E.G. Simmons (2001)
- Stemphylium eugeniae Verwoerd & du Plessis (1933)
- Stemphylium flavicans Jasevoli (1924)
- Stemphylium globuliferum (Vestergr.) E.G. Simmons (1969)
- Stemphylium gossypii X.G. Zhang & T.Y. Zhang (2002)
- Stemphylium gossypiicola (Y. Nisik.) E.G. Simmons (2003)
- Stemphylium gracilariae E.G. Simmons (1989)
- Stemphylium halophilum (J. Webster) Woudenb. & Crous (2017)
- Stemphylium herteri Speg. (1937)
- Stemphylium hydrangeae X.G. Zhang & T.Y. Zhang (2007)
- Stemphylium incarvilleae Byzova (1979)
- Stemphylium iranicum Esfand. (1950)
- Stemphylium ixeridis Y.F. Pei & X.G. Zhang (2010)
- Stemphylium kriegerianum (Bres.) E.G. Simmons (1997)
- Stemphylium lactucae X.G. Zhang & T.Y. Zhang (2002)
- Stemphylium lancipes (Ellis & Everh.) E.G. Simmons (1969)
- Stemphylium leguminum Sacc. (1919)
- Stemphylium loti J.H. Graham (1953)
- Stemphylium lucomagnoense Woudenb. & Crous (2017)
- Stemphylium luffae Y.F. Pei & X.G. Zhang (2011)
- Stemphylium lycii Y.F. Pei & X.G. Zhang (2011)
- Stemphylium lycopersici (Enjoji) W. Yamam. (1960)
- Stemphylium maculans Osterw. (1930)
- Stemphylium majusculum E.G. Simmons (1969)
- Stemphylium maritimum T.W. Johnson (1957)
- Stemphylium melanopus (Schwein.) S. Hughes (1958)
- Stemphylium microsporum Y.F. Pei & X.G. Zhang (2010)
- Stemphylium momordicae X.G. Zhang & T.Y. Zhang (2003)
- Stemphylium muriculatum Sacc. (1919)
- Stemphylium nabarii Sarwar (1966)
- Stemphylium nemopanthes Dearn. (1916)
- Stemphylium nigricans (G.F. Atk.) E.G. Simmons (2003)
- Stemphylium novae-zelandiae Woudenb. & Crous (2017)
- Stemphylium oblongum Yong Wang bis & X.G. Zhang (2009)
- Stemphylium paludiscirpi E.G. Simmons (2001)
- Stemphylium phaseolina Yong Wang bis & X.G. Zhang (2010)
- Stemphylium pisi X.G. Zhang & T.Y. Zhang (2007)
- Stemphylium plantaginis Yong Wang bis & X.G. Zhang (2006)
- Stemphylium platycodonis S.H. Yu (2014)
- Stemphylium pruni Yong Wang bis & X.G. Zhang (2006)
- Stemphylium pyrina Yong Wang bis & X.G. Zhang (2009)
- Stemphylium rombundicum Moslemi, Y.P. Tan & P.W.J. Taylor (2019)
- Stemphylium rosae (Wanas., Camporesi, E.B.G. Jones & K.D. Hyde) Phukhams. & K.D. Hyde (2020)
- Stemphylium rosae-caninae (Wanas., Camporesi, E.B.G. Jones & K.D. Hyde) Phukhams. & K.D. Hyde (2020)
- Stemphylium rosarium (Penz.) E.G. Simmons (1990)
- Stemphylium sarciniforme (Cavara) Wiltshire (1938)
- Stemphylium simmonsii Woudenb. & Crous (2017)
- Stemphylium solani G.F. Weber (1930)
- Stemphylium sophorae Yong Wang bis & X.G. Zhang (2009)
- Stemphylium spinaciae B.J. Li, Y.F. Zhou & Y.L. Guo (2011)
- Stemphylium subcongestum Yatel (1938)
- Stemphylium subglobuliferum F. Xue & X.G. Zhang (2005)
- Stemphylium subsphaericum Fairm. (1922)
- Stemphylium symphyti E.G. Simmons (2004)
- Stemphylium tabaci Oudem. (1902)
- Stemphylium tetraedricoglobosum Bubák & Syd. (1915)
- Stemphylium trifolii J.H. Graham (1957)
- Stemphylium triglochinicola B. Sutton & Piroz. (1963)
- Stemphylium trisectum (A. Raabe) E.G. Simmons (2002)
- Stemphylium truncatulae Moslemi, Y.P. Tan & P.W.J. Taylor (2019)
- Stemphylium turriforme X.G. Zhang & T.Y. Zhang (2007)
- Stemphylium variabilis Yong Wang bis & X.G. Zhang (2010)
- Stemphylium vesicarium (Wallr.) E.G. Simmons (1969)
- Stemphylium vinosum Torrend (1912)
- Stemphylium waikerieanum Moslemi, Y.P. Tan & P.W.J. Taylor (2019)
- Stemphylium xanthosomatis B. Huguenin (1966)
