= Graphyllium pentamerum =

Scientific classification
- Kingdom: Fungi
- Division: Ascomycota
- Class: Dothideomycetes
- Order: Pleosporales
- Family: Diademaceae
- Genus: Graphyllium
- Species: G. pentamerum

Binomial name
- Graphyllium pentamerum (P.Karst.) M.E.Barr (1990)

Synonyms
- Clathrospora pentamera (P.Karst.) Berl. (1888); Clathrospora platyspora (Sacc.) Berl. (1888); Comoclathris pentamera (P. Karst.) S.Ahmad (1979); Platyspora pentamera (P.Karst.) Wehm. (1961); Pleospora pentamera P.Karst. (1872); Pleospora platyspora Sacc. (1881)

Species of fungus

Graphyllium pentamerum is a species of fungus in the family Hysteriaceae. It is a plant pathogen infecting wheat.
