= Macrospora =

Scientific classification
- Domain: Eukaryota
- Kingdom: Fungi
- Division: Ascomycota
- Class: Dothideomycetes
- Order: Pleosporales
- Family: Pleosporaceae
- Genus: Macrospora; Fuckel

Type species
- Macrospora scirpicola (DC.) Fuckel

Genus of fungi

Macrospora is a genus of fungi in the family Pleosporaceae. This is a monotypic genus, containing the single species Macrospora scirpicola.
