= Pleospora lycopersici =

Scientific classification
- Domain: Eukaryota
- Kingdom: Fungi
- Division: Ascomycota
- Class: Dothideomycetes
- Order: Pleosporales
- Family: Pleosporaceae
- Genus: Pleospora
- Species: P. lycopersici

Binomial name
- Pleospora lycopersici Marchal & É.J. Marchal, (1921)

Species of fungus

Pleospora lycopersici is a plant pathogen fungus infecting tomatoes. It was originally found on the fruit of Lycopersicon (an old name for a tomato genus) in Belgium.
