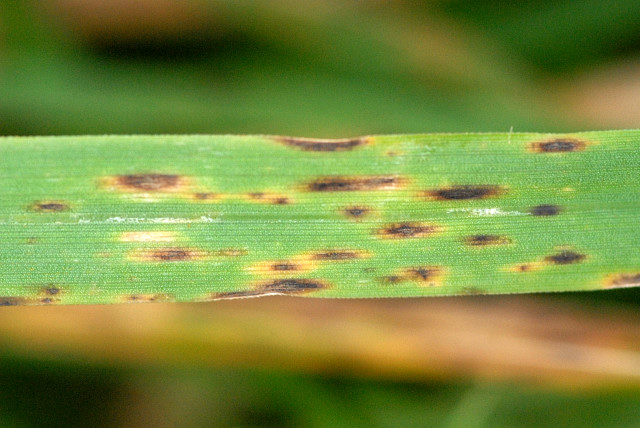
- Cochliobolus sativus

Scientific classification
- Kingdom: Fungi
- Division: Ascomycota
- Class: Dothideomycetes
- Order: Pleosporales
- Family: Pleosporaceae; Nitschke (1869)

Synonyms
- Pyrenophoraceae

= Pleosporaceae =

Family of fungi

Pleosporaceae is a family of sac fungi (Ascomycetes). They are pathogenic to humans or saprobic on woody and dead herbaceous stems or leaves.

They are generally anamorphic species (having an asexual reproductive stage). The type species is Stemphylium botryosum Wallr.

They have a cosmopolitan distribution worldwide.

== History ==
The family was created in 1869, based on the immersed ascomata and pseudoparaphyses of some species, and it was assigned to Sphaeriales order. It was then placed in the Pseudosphaeriaceae family by Theissen & Sydow (1917a) and then later raised to ordinal rank as the Pseudosphaeriales. Luttrell (1955) assigned Pleosporaceae under the Pleosporales order and treated Pseudosphaeriales as a synonym of Pleosporales. Later, availability of molecular data, and multi-gene phylogenetic studies confirmed the familial placement of Pleosporaceae with respect to other families in order Pleosporales (Lumbsch & Huhndorf 2010, Zhang et al. 2012b). Genera Alternaria, Bipolaris and Stemphylium are more common asexual morphs in Pleosporaceae and they are also saprobes or parasites on various hosts. Boonmee et al. transferred Allonecte from family Tubeufiaceae to family Pleosporaceae in 2011. Ariyawansa et al. (2015c) revised the family and accepted 18 genera into it. According to Wijayawardene et al. (2018), 16 genera were accepted in Pleosporaceae based on morphological and molecular data. Pem et al. (2019c) accepted genus Gibbago in Pleosporaceae based on morphological and molecular data.

== Genera ==
As accepted by Wijayawardene et al. 2020;

- Allonecte Syd. (3)
- Alternaria Nees ex Wallroth, 1816 (360)
- Bipolaris Shoemaker (179)
- Chalastospora E.G.Simmons, 2007 (2)
- Clathrospora Rabenh. (20)
- Cochliobolus Drechsler, 1934 (19)
- Comoclathris Clem.(30)
- Curvularia Boedijn (497)
- Decorospora (Pat.) Inderbitzin, Kohlm. & Volkm.-Kohlm, 2002 (3)
- Diademosa Shoemaker & C.E. Babc. (4)
- Dichotomophthora Mehrl. & Fitzp. ex M.B.Ellis, 1971 (6)
- Drechslera S.Ito, 1930 (36)
- Embellisia E.G.Simmons, 1971 (3)
- Exserohilum K.J. Leonard & Suggs (113)
- Extrawettsteinina M.E. Barr (2)
- Gibbago E.G.Simmons, 1986 (2)
- Johnalcornia Y.P.Tan & R.G.Shivas, 2014 (4)
- Lewia M.E. Barr & E.G. Simmons
- Macrospora Fuckel (2)
- Macrosporium Fries, 1832 (13)
- Malustela (1)
- Mycoporopsis Müll.Arg. (12)
- Paradendryphiella Woudenb. & Crous, 2013 (2)
- Paraliomyces Kohlmeyer, 1959 (2)
- Platysporoides (Wehm.) Shoemaker & C.E. Babc. (12)
- Pleoseptum A.W. Ramaley & M.E. Barr (1)
- Pleospora Rabenh. ex Ces. & De Not., 1863 (458)
- Porocercospora Amaradasa, Amundsen, H.Madrid & Crous, 2014 (12)
- Pseudoyuconia Lar. N. Vailjeva (1)
- Prathoda Subram. (2)
- Pseudoyuconia Lar.N. Vassiljeva (1)
- Pyrenophora Fr., 1849 (133)
- Scleroplea (1)
- Stemphylium Wallroth, 1833 (96)
- Tamaricicola Thambug., Camporesi & K.D. Hyde (1)
- Teretispora E.G.Simmons (2)
- Typhicola Crous, 2019 (2)
- Xenodidymella Qian Chen & L. Cai, in Chen, Jiang, Zhang, Cai & Crous, 2015 (18)
- Zeuctomorpha

Figures in brackets are approx. how many species per genus.
