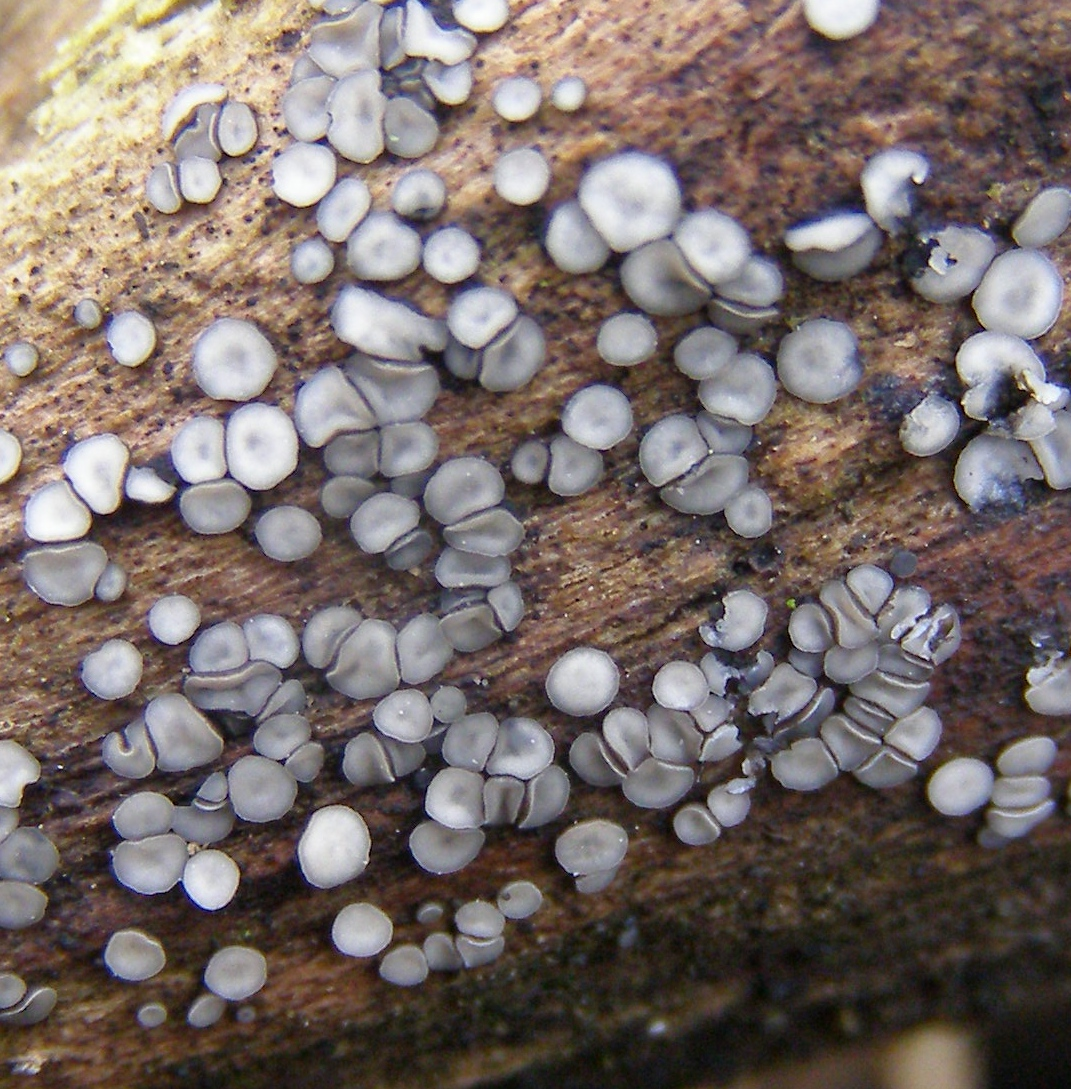
- A fungus of the genus Mollisia

Scientific classification
- Kingdom: Fungi
- Division: Ascomycota
- Class: Leotiomycetes
- Order: Helotiales
- Family: Mollisiaceae; Rehm

= Mollisiaceae =

Family of fungi

Mollisiaceae is a family of fungi in the order Helotiales. It contains almost 800 species in 17 genera with multiple genera remaining undescribed. Saprotrophs and root endophytes are prominent in the family but it also includes endophytes of other plant tissues. Due to a lack of accessible morphological features, the family has been difficult to study resulting in limited understanding of its taxonomy. Genetic studies suggest that the family comprises much overlooked biodiversity.

== Genera ==
- Barrenia E.Walsh & N.Zhang, 2015 (3 species)
- Bulbomollisia Graddon (3 species)
- Cystodendron Bubák (11 species)
- Discocurtisia J.A.Nannfeldt, 1983 (1 species)
- Mollisia (Fr.) P.Karst., 1871 (411 species)
- Neotapesia E.Müll. & Hütter (3 species)
- Niptera Fr., 1849 (80 species)
- Nipterella Starbäck ex Dennis (4 species)
- Phialocephala W.B.Kendr. (152 species)
- Pseudonaevia Dennis & Spooner (2 species)
- Pyrenopeziza Fuckel (221 species)
- Sarconiptera Raitv., 2003 (1 species)
- Scutobelonium Graddon (2 species)
- Scutomollisia Nannf. (15 species)
- Tapesia (Pers.) Fuckel (121 species)
- Trimmatostroma Corda (42 species)
- Variocladium Descals & Marvanová (3 species)
