= Burghard Hein =

German fungal taxonomist and herbarium curator

- Born: January 2, 1944; Preußisch Holland, Germany (now Pasłęk, Poland)
- Died: April 7, 2014 (aged 70); Berlin-Charlottenburg
- Education: Free University of Berlin
- Scientific career
- Workplaces: Botanic Garden and Botanical Museum Berlin-Dahlem
- Thesis: Revision der Gattung Laetinaevia Nannf. (Ascomycetes) und Neuordnung der Naevioideae (Revision of the genus Laetinaevia Nannf. (Ascomycetes) and rearrangement of the Naevioideae)
- Doctoral advisors: Josef Poelt
- Author abbrev. (botany): B.Hein

Burghard Hein was the curator of the mycology collection at the Botanic Garden and Botanical Museum Berlin-Dahlem and an authority on the Discomycete fungi.

== Early life and education ==
Burghard Hein and his parents lived in Berlin-Charlottenburg all their lives. His father ran a white goods shop. Hein studied biology, geography and politics at the Free University of Berlin, graduating in 1969. He also undertook his doctoral research there about Discomycetes fungi under the supervision of Josef Poelt. His research described a revision of the taxonomy of the revision of the genus Laetinaevia and Naevioideae. His doctorate was awarded in 1976.

== Career ==
Hein was employed as a scientific assistant in the Institute of Systematic Botany and Phytogeography of the Free University of Berlin from 1970 until he joined the Berlin Botanical Garden and Botanical Museum Berlin-Dahlem in 1974. He became a Curator of the mycological herbarium in 1975 and remained there until he retired in January 2007. He became the Senior Curator in 1993. He reorganised historical fungal specimens and their catalogue, so that there were 300,000 curated specimens when he retired. In addition, Hein worked with the public, especially in the autumn to confirm identification of edible fungi. He was part of collecting expeditions to West Africa, Europe (Scotland, Norway, the Alps), South America (Costa Rica, Venezuela) that increased the number of specimens in the herbarium by several hundred. In the later part of his career he was part of the public relations team of the botanic garden.

From the late 1990s he was responsible for construction of an early on-line database summarising taxonomic information about 5000 members of the Dermateaceae, including writing the software.

== Publications ==
Hein is the author or co-author of at least 20 scientific publications and several books, including:

- B. Hein 1988 Liste der Arten und infraspecifischen Taxa von P. Hennings : mit Angabe der Typen in den Herbarien des Botanischen Museums Berlin-Dahlem und des Instituts für Allgemeine Botanik in Hamburg. (List of the species and infraspecific taxa by P. Hennings : with indication of the types in the herbaria of the Botanical Museum Berlin-Dahlem and the Institute for General Botany in Hamburg.) Englera 10 Botanischer Garten und Botanisches Museum, Berlin-Dahlem pp 385
- B Hein 1980 Rasterelektronenmikroskopische Unter suchungen an Haaren von Hyaloscyphaceae.(Scanning electron microscopic studies on hairs of Hyaloscyphaceae.) Nova Hedwigia 32 31–62

He described three new genera (Bryodiscus (now Sphaeropezia), Naevala and Naeviopsis) and 18 species.
