= H. fenestrata =

H. fenestrata may refer to:

- Hecatesia fenestrata, Boisduval, 1829, a moth species in the genus Hecatesia
- Hexatoma fenestrata, Brunetti, 1911, a crane fly species in the genus Hexatoma
- Hysterostegiella fenestrata, a fungus species

== See also ==
- Fenestrata (disambiguation)
