= Dermea pseudotsugae =

Scientific classification
- Kingdom: Fungi
- Division: Ascomycota
- Class: Leotiomycetes
- Order: Helotiales
- Family: Dermateaceae
- Genus: Dermea
- Species: D. pseudotsugae

Binomial name
- Dermea pseudotsugae A. Funk, (1967)

Species of fungus

Dermea pseudotsugae is a plant pathogen.
