= Graddonia =

Scientific classification
- Kingdom: Fungi
- Division: Ascomycota
- Class: Leotiomycetes
- Order: Helotiales
- Family: Dermateaceae
- Genus: Graddonia; Dennis (1955)

Type species
- Graddonia coracina (Bres.) Dennis (1955)

Genus of fungi

Graddonia is a fungal genus in the family Dermateaceae. This is a monotypic genus, containing the single species Graddonia coracina.

== See also ==
- List of Dermateaceae genera
