= Pseudopeziza jonesii =

Scientific classification
- Kingdom: Fungi
- Division: Ascomycota
- Class: Leotiomycetes
- Order: Helotiales
- Family: Dermateaceae
- Genus: Pseudopeziza
- Species: P. jonesii

Binomial name
- Pseudopeziza jonesii Nannfeldt (1932)

Species of fungus

Pseudopeziza jonesii is a plant pathogen infecting alfalfa.
