= Actinoscypha muelleri =

Scientific classification
- Kingdom: Fungi
- Division: Ascomycota
- Class: Leotiomycetes
- Order: Helotiales
- Family: Dermateaceae
- Genus: Actinoscypha
- Species: A. muelleri

Binomial name
- Actinoscypha muelleri Graddon, 1972

Species of fungus

Actinoscypha muelleri is a species of fungus belonging to the family Dermateaceae.
