= Naevala perexigua =

Scientific classification
- Kingdom: Fungi
- Division: Ascomycota
- Class: Leotiomycetes
- Order: Helotiales
- Family: Dermateaceae
- Genus: Naevala
- Species: N. perexigua

Binomial name
- Naevala perexigua (Roberge ex Desm.) K. Holm & L. Holm, (1978)

Synonyms
- Coccomyces minutissimus (Auersw.) Gola, (1930); Laestadia minutissima (Auersw.) Sacc., (1882); Naevala minutissima (Auersw.) B. Hein, (1976); Naevia minutissima (Auersw.) Rehm, (1888); Naevia minutissima Rehm, (1888); Phacidium minutissimum Auersw., (1860); Phacidium perexiguum Roberge ex Desm. Schizothyrium perexiguum (Roberge ex Desm.) Höhn., (1917)

Species of fungus

Naevala perexigua is a plant pathogen.
