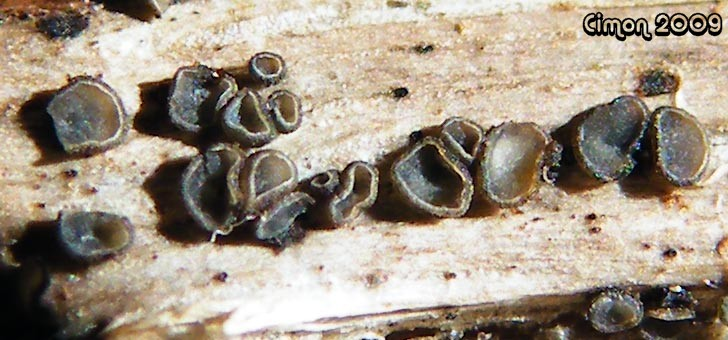
- Helicogonium trabinelloides parasite on Pyrenopeziza sp.

Scientific classification
- Kingdom: Fungi
- Division: Ascomycota
- Class: Leotiomycetes
- Order: Phacidiales
- Family: Helicogoniaceae
- Genus: Helicogonium; W.L.White

Type species
- Helicogonium jacksonii W.L.White

= Helicogonium =

Genus of fungi

Helicogonium is a genus of fungi in the Ascomycota phylum.
