= Pseudopeziza medicaginis =

Scientific classification
- Kingdom: Fungi
- Division: Ascomycota
- Class: Leotiomycetes
- Order: Helotiales
- Family: Dermateaceae
- Genus: Pseudopeziza
- Species: P. medicaginis

Binomial name
- Pseudopeziza medicaginis (Lib.) Sacc., (1887)

Synonyms
- Phacidium medicaginis Lib., (1832); Phyllachora medicaginis Sacc., (1873)

Species of fungus

Pseudopeziza medicaginis (P. medicaginis) is a fungal pathogen of alfalfa.

== Host and symptoms ==
The pathogen P. medicaginis is an ascomycete and can cause leaf spot in crops like red clover. The common leaf spot on alfalfa is a foliar disease. Although not much research has been done on this specific disease, it has been reported as the most common alfalfa disease and caused the greatest yield loss in alfalfa crops over the past 100 years. It has been shown in multiple studies that it can cause up to 40% loss in yield but average losses are closer to 18%. The first symptoms of leaf spot are small circular lesions that form on the lowest leaves on the plant. These lesions are usually less than 2 mm in diameter and are brown or black in color with smooth margins. The younger leaves show symptoms first, and the disease works its way up the plant. Eventually, the leaves will become so diseased that they will turn yellow and fall off. P. medicaginis will not kill the plant but there will be a reduction in quality and yield. Leaf spots start to appear 5 – 13 days after infection and apothecia are formed 14 days later. In the center of the lesion, a dark colored raised disk can be observed and is known as the apothecium. This feature is a diagnostic sign of the disease. These ascocarps contain the asci which eventually release ascospores to infect more tissues. If the disease progresses enough, elliptical lesions can be observed on the succulent stems. These lesions are not commonly found and do not produce fruiting bodies.

== Environment ==
Common leaf spot can be found in any alfalfa field across the United States of America (US). While the Southwestern states, including Arizona, New Mexico, Utah, and Colorado, are only at moderate risk for this disease, the rest of the US is considered to be under a severe risk. Common leaf spot can be found anywhere that alfalfa is grown, but prefers cool, moist conditions, and acidic soils. The ideal temperature for the pathogen is 60–75 °F (16–24 °C). The first and second harvests of alfalfa are the most threatened. Second harvest tends to be the most affected by the disease because the environmental conditions are just right and the disease has had time to develop. During a rainy season, the dense canopy of alfalfa traps the humidity and makes the perfect environment for the pathogen, giving rise to common leaf spot.

== Management ==
There has been a significant amount of work done over the years to produce a strain of alfalfa that is resistant to P. medicaginis. However, currently there is no variety that is completely resistant. Planting less susceptible varieties of alfalfa is the best way to combat the issue of common leaf spot. It is important to scout fields early and look for symptoms on the younger leaves of plants. Fungicides can be applied, but are not always successful or cost effective. The severity of the disease is very dependent on the weather and the environment. During cold and wet seasons, the fields should be scouted frequently and more carefully. If leaf spot is discovered early in the season, it is possible the symptoms will decrease as the weather warms up. The best thing to do is to harvest early because delayed harvest can make the situation worse. Harvesting early will prevent further defoliation of the current crop, which will preserve some of the quality and yield. P. medicaginis overwinters in infected plant debris so harvesting early can also reduce the amount of inoculum available for further infections in that growing season and the next year. Harvesting early also allows the field to dry out, and reduces humidity in the phyllosphere making conditions less ideal for the pathogen. Another way to reduce the effects of common leaf spot is proper nutrient management. Applications of potassium fertilizer can minimize yield loss, severity, and leaf drop.
