= Waltonia =

Waltonia may refer to:

- Waltonia (brachiopod), a brachiopod genus in the family Terebratellidae
- Waltonia (fungus), a fungus genus in the family Dermateaceae
