= Durandiella pseudotsugae =

Scientific classification
- Kingdom: Fungi
- Division: Ascomycota
- Class: Leotiomycetes
- Order: Helotiales
- Family: Dermateaceae
- Genus: Durandiella
- Species: D. pseudotsugae

Binomial name
- Durandiella pseudotsugae A. Funk, (1962)

Species of fungus

Durandiella pseudotsugae is a plant pathogen which causes Dime canker in Douglas-fir trees.
