= Leucocoprinus minimus =

Scientific classification
- Kingdom: Fungi
- Division: Basidiomycota
- Class: Agaricomycetes
- Order: Agaricales
- Family: Agaricaceae
- Genus: Leucocoprinus
- Species: L. minimus

Binomial name
- Leucocoprinus minimus (Berk) Pegler (1981)

Synonyms
- Hiatula minima Berk (1852); Leptomyces minimus Murrill (1916); Lepiota minima Dennis (1952)

Species of fungus

Leucocoprinus minimus is a species of mushroom-producing fungus in the family Agaricaceae.

== Taxonomy ==
It was first described in 1852 by the British mycologist Miles Joseph Berkeley who classified it as Hiatula minima.

In 1916, it was reclassified as Leptomyces minimus by the American mycologist William Murrill.

This was reclassified as Lepiota minima in 1952 by the British mycologist Richard William George Dennis and then as Leucocoprinus minimus in 1981 by the British mycologist David Pegler.

== Description ==
Leucocoprinus minimus is a small dapperling mushroom with very thin white flesh that becomes pink and deliquesces with age.

Cap: 2–3 cm wide. Hemispherical with a flat umbo. The surface is white and dotted with tiny dark purple-brown scales which are denser at the centre disc. It has striations (plicato-striate) running from the cap margins halfway to the centre of the cap. Stem: 2mm thick and equal in width across the length however no length is provided in Dennis' description. It is smooth, hollow and curved with a white surface that becomes purple-brown at the base. Gills: Thin, equal, crowded and remote from the stem. They are about 2mm wide. No colour is provided in the description. Spores: 6–10 × 5–7 μm. Elliptical and hyaline. They have a red amyloid reaction when mounted in Melzer's reagent. Basidia: 4 spored.

Pegler provides more detail on the spores:

Spores: 7–9 × 5.5–6 μm. Ovoid to ellipsoid with a truncated, conspicuous apical germ pore. Dextrinoid.

Pegler also notes that the species is fragile and lacks an annulus on the stem when mature but does not otherwise add to the description.

== Habitat and distribution ==
L. minimus is scarcely recorded and little known. The specimens studied by Berkeley were collected in Santo Domingo by M. Augustus Sallé. Murrill stated that the specimens were only known from this location. Dennis made his study based on specimens collected in the Trinidad where they were found growing gregariously on stumps in the forest. Pegler details a specimen collected on Santa Cruz Island in the Galápagos where they were found in the Miconia zone of the island on mossy roots amongst leaf litter.

== Etymology ==
The specific epithet minimus (originally minima) is Latin for 'smallest'.
