= P. brassicae =

P. brassicae may refer to:

- Phyllosticta brassicae, a fungal pathogen
- Phytometra brassicae, a moth that is very destructive to plants
- Phytophthora brassicae, a water mould
- Pieris brassicae, a pest butterfly
- Plasmodiophora brassicae, a plant pathogen
- Pyrenopeziza brassicae, a plant pathogen
