= Pseudopeziza trifolii =

Scientific classification
- Kingdom: Fungi
- Division: Ascomycota
- Class: Leotiomycetes
- Order: Helotiales
- Family: Dermateaceae
- Genus: Pseudopeziza
- Species: P. trifolii

Binomial name
- Pseudopeziza trifolii (Biv.) Fuckel, (1870)

Synonyms
- Ascobolus trifolii Biv., (1816); Mollisia trifolii (Biv.) W. Phillips, (1887); Phacidium trifolii (Biv.) Boud., (1869)

Species of fungus

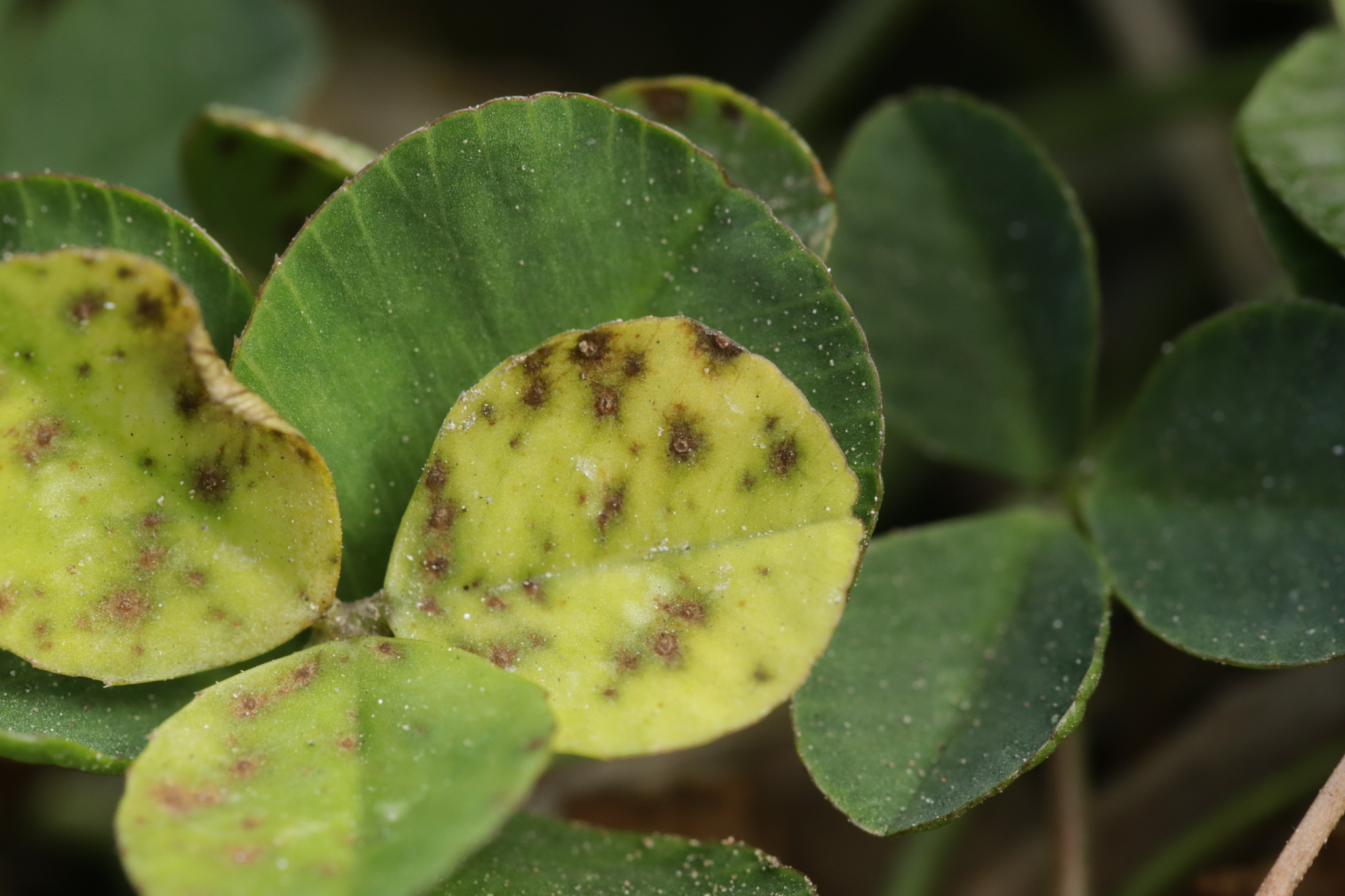
Pseudopeziza trifolii on leaf

Pseudopeziza trifolii is a plant pathogen infecting red clover.
