= Actinoscypha =

Scientific classification
- Kingdom: Fungi
- Division: Ascomycota
- Class: Leotiomycetes
- Order: Helotiales
- Family: Dermateaceae
- Genus: Actinoscypha; P.Karst.

Genus of fungi

Actinoscypha is a genus of fungus belonging to the family Dermateaceae.

The genus was first described by Petter Adolf Karsten in 1888.

Species:

- Actinoscypha muelleri
