= Leptotrochila medicaginis =

Scientific classification
- Kingdom: Fungi
- Division: Ascomycota
- Class: Leotiomycetes
- Order: Helotiales
- Family: Dermateaceae
- Genus: Leptotrochila
- Species: L. medicaginis

Binomial name
- Leptotrochila medicaginis (Fuckel) Schüepp, (1959)

Synonyms
- Pyrenopeziza medicaginis Fuckel (1870)

Species of fungus

Leptotrochila medicaginis is a fungal plant pathogen.
