= Duebenia =

Scientific classification
- Kingdom: Fungi
- Division: Ascomycota
- Class: Leotiomycetes
- Order: Helotiales
- Family: Dermateaceae
- Genus: Duebenia; Fr.

Type species
- Duebenia rufa Fr.

Species
- D. blyttiana D. carnea D. coccinea D. compta D. rufa

Genus of fungi

Duebenia is a genus of fungi in the family Dermateaceae. The genus contains 2 species.

== See also ==
- List of Dermateaceae genera
