= Sorokina =

Scientific classification
- Kingdom: Fungi
- Division: Ascomycota
- Class: Leotiomycetes
- Order: Helotiales
- Family: Dermateaceae
- Genus: Sorokina; Sacc.

Type species
- Sorokina microspora (Berk.) Sacc.

Genus of fungi

Sorokina is a genus of fungi in the family Dermateaceae. The genus contains 6 species.

The genus was circumscribed by Pier Andrea Saccardo in Syll. Fung. vol.10 on page 42 in 1892.

The genus name of Sorokina is in honour of Nikolai Vasilevich Sorokin (1846–1909), who was a Russian botanist, Mycologist, Microbiologist and Parasitologist. He was Professor of Botany and Director of the Botanical Garden of the Kazan Federal University.

== Species ==
As accepted by Species Fungorum;

- Sorokina blasteniospora Rehm (1900)
- Sorokina bogoriensis Henn. & E. Nyman (1899)
- Sorokina caeruleogrisea Spooner, Læssøe & Lodge (1998)
- Sorokina frondicola Joanne E. Taylor, K.D. Hyde & E.B.G. Jones (2003)
- Sorokina insignis Penz. & Sacc. (1902)
- Sorokina lignicola (Rodway) Dennis (1958)
- Sorokina microspora (Berk. ex Cooke) Sacc. (1892)
- Sorokina tjibodensis Henn. & E. Nyman (1899)
- Sorokina uleana Rehm (1900)

== See also ==
- List of Dermateaceae genera
