= Chaetonaevia =

Scientific classification
- Kingdom: Fungi
- Division: Ascomycota
- Class: Leotiomycetes
- Order: Helotiales
- Family: Dermateaceae
- Genus: Chaetonaevia; Arx

Type species
- Chaetonaevia nannfeldtii Arx

Species
- C. nannfeldtii C. petasitis C. ulmicola

Genus of fungi

Chaetonaevia is a genus of fungi in the family Dermateaceae. The genus contains 3 species.

== See also ==
- List of Dermateaceae genera
