= Angelina (fungus) =

Scientific classification
- Kingdom: Fungi
- Division: Ascomycota
- Class: Leotiomycetes
- Order: Helotiales
- Family: Dermateaceae
- Genus: Angelina; Fr.

Type species
- Angelina rufescens (Schwein.) Duby

Species
- A. beccariana A. conglomerata A. leprieurii A. maura A. rufescens

Genus of fungi

Angelina is a genus of fungi in the family Dermateaceae.

== See also ==
- List of Dermateaceae genera
