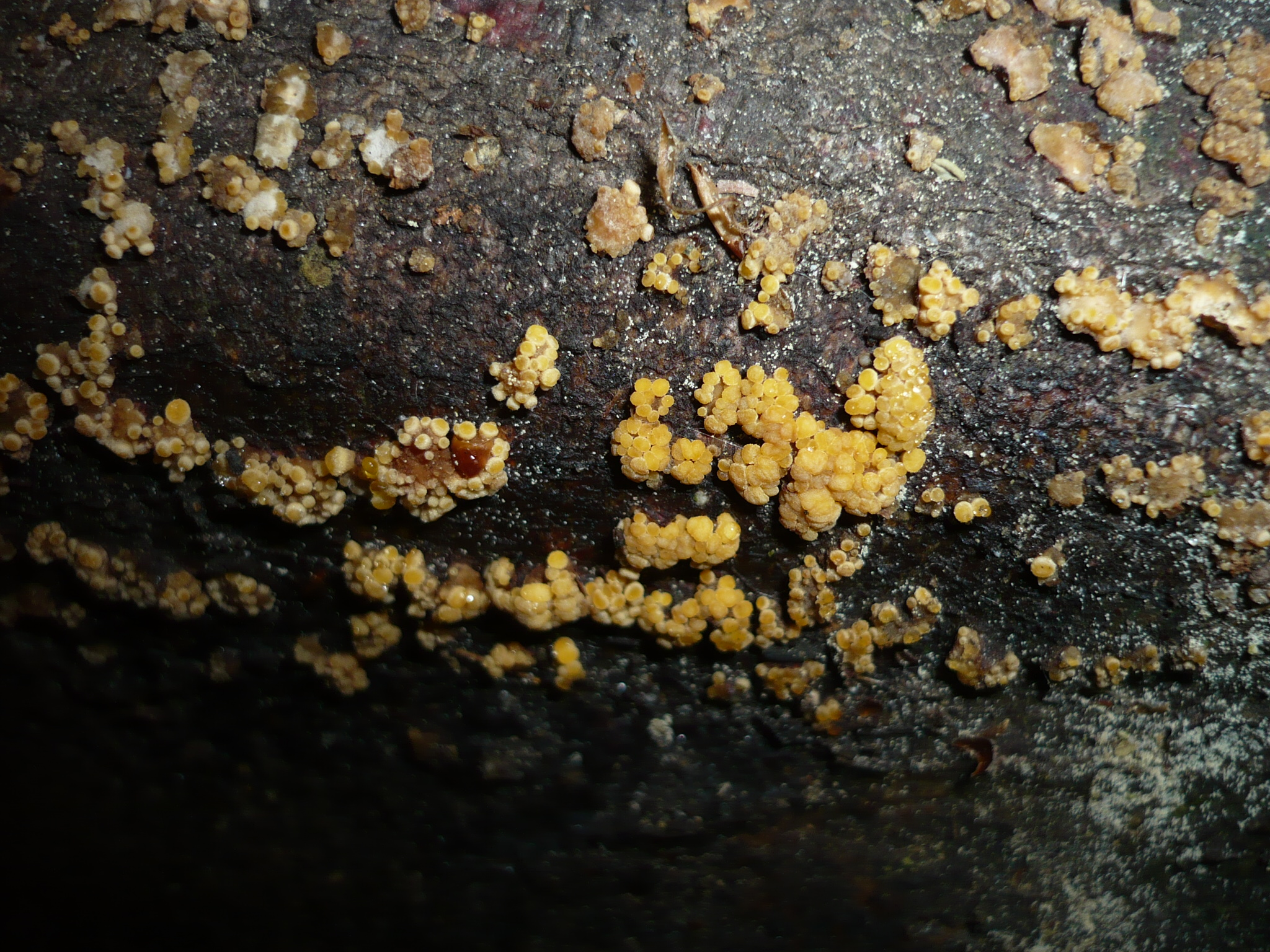
- Pezicula carpinea

Scientific classification
- Kingdom: Fungi
- Division: Ascomycota
- Class: Leotiomycetes
- Order: Helotiales
- Family: Dermateaceae
- Genus: Pezicula; Tul. & C. Tul.

= Pezicula =

Genus of fungi

Pezicula (syn. Ocellaria) is a genus of fungi in the family Dermateaceae. It was first described by the brothers Charles and Louis René Tulasne in 1865. The genus contains 37 species.

== See also ==
- List of Dermateaceae genera
