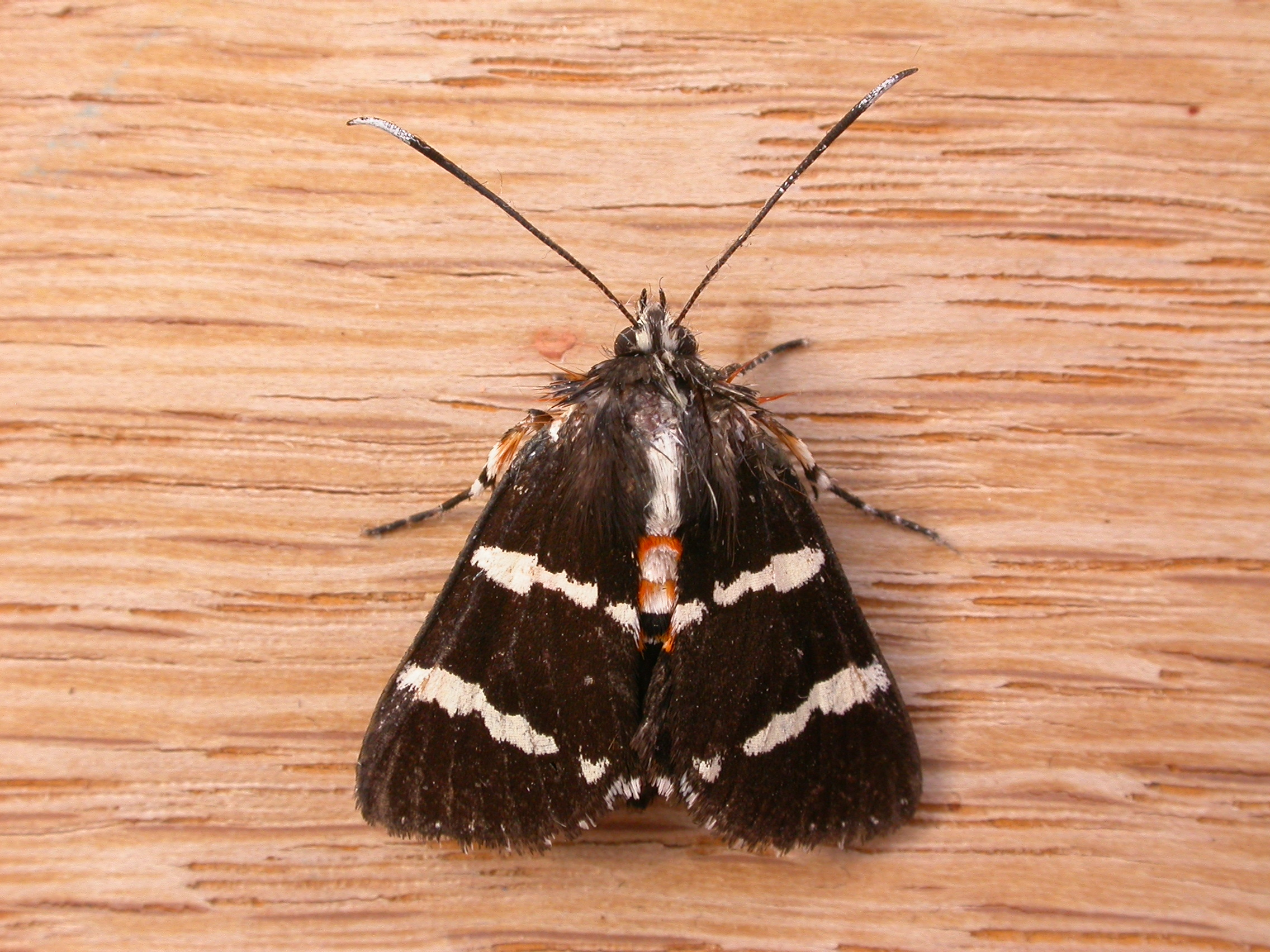
- Hecatesia fenestrata

Scientific classification
- Domain: Eukaryota
- Kingdom: Animalia
- Phylum: Arthropoda
- Class: Insecta
- Order: Lepidoptera
- Superfamily: Noctuoidea
- Family: Noctuidae
- Subfamily: Agaristinae
- Genus: Hecatesia; Boisduval, 1829

Synonyms
- Prostheta Turner, 1922

= Hecatesia =

Genus of moths

Hecatesia is a genus of moths of the family Noctuidae. The genus was erected by Jean Baptiste Boisduval in 1829.

== Species ==
- Hecatesia exultans Walker, [1865]
- Hecatesia fenestrata Boisduval, 1829
- Hecatesia thyridion Feisthamel, 1839
