= Phaeonaevia =

Scientific classification
- Kingdom: Fungi
- Division: Ascomycota
- Class: Leotiomycetes
- Order: Helotiales
- Family: Dermateaceae
- Genus: Phaeonaevia; L. Holm & K. Holm

Type species
- Phaeonaevia monilispora (Starbäck) L. Holm & K. Holm

Genus of fungi

Phaeonaevia is a genus of fungi in the family Dermateaceae. This is a monotypic genus, containing the single species Phaeonaevia monilispora.

== See also ==
- List of Dermateaceae genera
