= Micropeziza =

Scientific classification
- Kingdom: Fungi
- Division: Ascomycota
- Class: Leotiomycetes
- Order: Helotiales
- Family: Dermateaceae
- Genus: Micropeziza; Fuckel

Type species
- Micropeziza poae Fuckel

Species
- M. cornea M. diphasii M. fuscidula M. iridis M. karstenii M. poae M. rufula M. subvelata M. trollii M. verrucosa

Genus of fungi

Micropeziza is a genus of fungi in the family Dermateaceae. The genus contains 5 species.

== See also ==
- List of Dermateaceae genera
