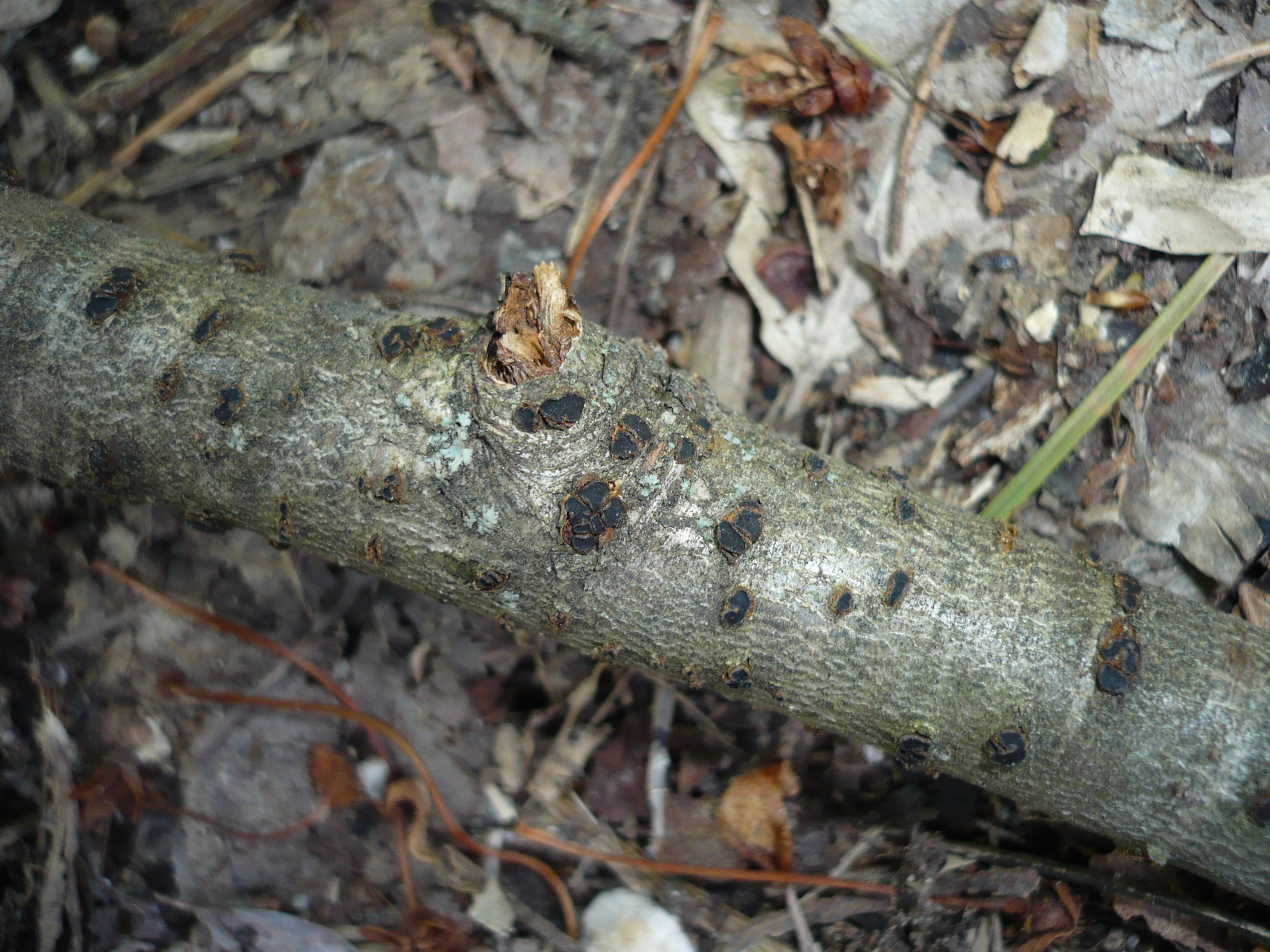
- Dermea cerasi

Scientific classification
- Kingdom: Fungi
- Division: Ascomycota
- Class: Leotiomycetes
- Order: Helotiales
- Family: Dermateaceae
- Genus: Dermea; Fries

Type species
- Dermea cerasi (Persoon) Fr.

= Dermea =

Genus of fungi

Dermea is a genus of ascomycete fungi which attack trees, especially Prunus fruit trees - for instance, D. prunasti causes greengage plum die-back. On the whole, although Dermea species are considered pathogenic, not many serious diseases have been reported to be caused by this genus.

Dermea was initially authored in 1825 by the famous mycologist Elias Magnus Fries and contains at least 22 species.

== Species ==
- Dermea acerina
- Dermea ariae
- Dermea balsamea
- Dermea bicolor
- Dermea brenckleana
- Dermea cerasi
- Dermea chinensis
- Dermea chionanthi
- Dermea craterium
- Dermea cydoniae
- Dermea grovesii
- Dermea hamamelidis
- Dermea libocedri
- Dermea livida
- Dermea molliuscula
- Dermea morthieri
- Dermea padi
- Dermea peckiana
- Dermea piceina
- Dermea pinicola
- Dermea populea
- Dermea prunastri
- Dermea pruni
- Dermea pseudotsugae
- Dermea rhytidiformans
- Dermea spiraeae
- Dermea tetrasperma
- Dermea tulasnei
- Dermea viburni

== See also ==
- List of Dermateaceae genera
