= Dibeloniella =

Scientific classification
- Kingdom: Fungi
- Division: Ascomycota
- Class: Leotiomycetes
- Order: Helotiales
- Family: Dermateaceae
- Genus: Dibeloniella; Nannf.

Type species
- Dibeloniella vossii (Rehm) Nannf.

Species
- D. citrinella D. raineri D. vossii

Genus of fungi

Dibeloniella is a genus of fungi in the family Dermateaceae.

== See also ==
- List of Dermateaceae genera
