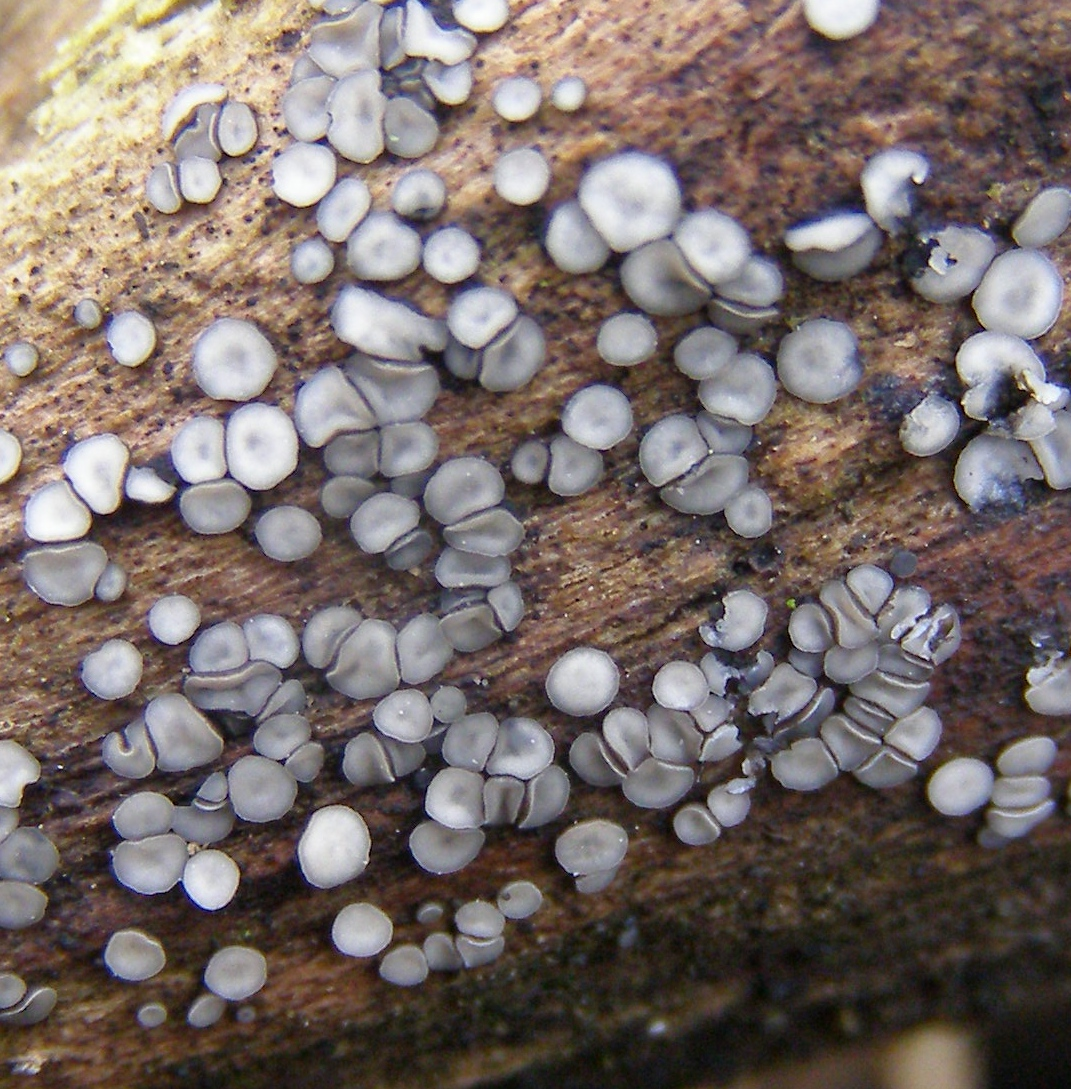
- Mollisia sp.

Scientific classification
- Kingdom: Fungi
- Division: Ascomycota
- Class: Leotiomycetes
- Order: Helotiales
- Family: Dermateaceae
- Genus: Mollisia (Fr.) P.Karst. (1871)

Type species
- Mollisia cinerea (Batsch) P.Karst. (1871)

Species
- 121, see text

Synonyms
- Aleuriella P.Karst. (1871); Crustula Velen. (1934); Syntexis Theiss. (1916)

= Mollisia =

Genus of fungi

Mollisia is a genus of fungi in the family Mollisiaceae , formerly in the family Dermateaceae. The genus contains 121 species.

== Species ==
- Mollisia amenticola
- Mollisia aquosa
- Mollisia caesia
- Mollisia caespiticia
- Mollisia caricina
- Mollisia casaresiae
- Mollisia chionea
- Mollisia cinerascens
- Mollisia cinerea
- Mollisia cinerella
- Mollisia cinereo-olivascens
- Mollisia cirsiicola
- Mollisia clavata
- Mollisia coerulans
- Mollisia conigena
- Mollisia coprosmae
- Mollisia culmina
- Mollisia dactyligluma
- Mollisia dextrinospora
- Mollisia discolor
- Mollisia erumpens
- Mollisia escharodes
- Mollisia euphrasiae
- Mollisia fallax
- Mollisia fallens
- Mollisia fungorum
- Mollisia fuscoparaphysata
- Mollisia fuscostriata
- Mollisia heterosperma
- Mollisia humidicola
- Mollisia hydrophila
- Mollisia jugosa
- Mollisia juncina
- Mollisia leucosphaeria
- Mollisia ligni
- Mollisia lurida
- Mollisia lychnidis
- Mollisia lycopi
- Mollisia macrosperma
- Mollisia mediella
- Mollisia melaleuca
- Mollisia minutissima
- Mollisia mutabilis
- Mollisia myricariae
- Mollisia nigrescens
- Mollisia olivascens
- Mollisia orcadensis
- Mollisia palustris
- Mollisia poaeoides
- Mollisia populi
- Mollisia rabenhorstii
- Mollisia ramealis
- Mollisia rehmii
- Mollisia sordidula
- Mollisia spectabilis
- Mollisia sphaeroides
- Mollisia stellata
- Mollisia stromaticola
- Mollisia subcorticalis
- Mollisia submelaena
- Mollisia tenuispora
- Mollisia teucrii
- Mollisia typhae
- Mollisia uda
- Mollisia undulatodepressula
- Mollisia ventosa

== See also ==
- List of Dermateaceae genera
