= Aivenia =

Scientific classification
- Kingdom: Fungi
- Division: Ascomycota
- Class: Leotiomycetes
- Order: Helotiales
- Family: Dermateaceae
- Genus: Aivenia; Svrček

Type species
- Aivenia tantula Svrček

Species
- A. aconiti A. calthae A. foliicola A. tantula

Genus of fungi

Aivenia is a genus of fungi in the family Dermateaceae. The genus contain 4 species.
