= Belonopsis =

Scientific classification
- Kingdom: Fungi
- Division: Ascomycota
- Class: Leotiomycetes
- Order: Helotiales
- Family: Dermateaceae
- Genus: Belonopsis (Sacc.) Sacc. & P. Syd.

Type species
- Belonopsis excelsior (P. Karst.) Rehm

Genus of fungi

Belonopsis is a genus of fungi in the family Dermateaceae. The genus contain 7 species.

== Species ==
- Belonopsis aciculispora
- Belonopsis advena
- Belonopsis asteroma
- Belonopsis atriella
- Belonopsis bambusae
- Belonopsis betulina
- Belonopsis calamicola
- Belonopsis coccinea
- Belonopsis ebudensis
- Belonopsis ericae
- Belonopsis eriophila
- Belonopsis eriophori
- Belonopsis filispora
- Belonopsis graminea
- Belonopsis guestphalicum
- Belonopsis ingae
- Belonopsis iridis
- Belonopsis juncicola
- Belonopsis junciseda
- Belonopsis lacustris var. caricina
- Belonopsis longispora
- Belonopsis mediella
- Belonopsis montanensis
- Belonopsis myrtillina
- Belonopsis obscura
- Belonopsis pallens
- Belonopsis pamparum
- Belonopsis purpurascens
- Belonopsis retincola
- Belonopsis sordidula
- Belonopsis tropicalis
- Belonopsis uredo
- Belonopsis vaginalis

== See also ==
- List of Dermateaceae genera
