= Pyrenopeziza brassicae =

Scientific classification
- Kingdom: Fungi
- Division: Ascomycota
- Class: Leotiomycetes
- Order: Helotiales
- Family: Dermateaceae
- Genus: Pyrenopeziza
- Species: P. brassicae

Binomial name
- Pyrenopeziza brassicae B. Sutton & Rawl., (1979)

Synonyms
- Cylindrodochium concentricum (Grev.) Bonord., (1851); Gloeosporium concentricum (Grev.) Berk. & Broome, (1850)

Species of fungus

Pyrenopeziza brassicae is a plant pathogen infecting Brassicaceae (formerly known as Cruciferae).
