= Pirottaea =

Scientific classification
- Kingdom: Fungi
- Division: Ascomycota
- Class: Leotiomycetes
- Order: Helotiales
- Family: Dermateaceae
- Genus: Pirottaea; Sacc.

Type species
- Pirottaea veneta Sacc. & Speg.

Synonyms
- Echinella Massee; Ploettnerula W.Kirschstein, 1924

Genus of fungi

Pirottaea is a genus of fungi in the family Dermateaceae. The genus contained 26 species in 2009. It went up to about 48 species later.

The genus name of Pirottaea is in honour of Pietro Romualdo Pirotta (1853–1936), who was an Italian professor of botany. He was made Knight of the Crown of Italy.

The genus was circumscribed by Pier Andrea Saccardo in Michelia vl.1 (Issue 4) on page 424 in 1878.

== Species ==
As accepted by Species Fungorum;

- Pirottaea absinthiicola Nannf.
- Pirottaea aconiti Petr.
- Pirottaea adenostylidis Nannf.
- Pirottaea astragali Nannf.
- Pirottaea aterrima (Lasch) Sacc.
- Pirottaea atrofusca Chleb. & Chlebická
- Pirottaea bavarica Kirschst.
- Pirottaea bresadolae Sacc.
- Pirottaea brevipila (Roberge ex Desm.) J.Schröt.
- Pirottaea bromeliacearum Rick
- Pirottaea caesiella (Bres.) Nannf.
- Pirottaea corvina (Pers.) Sacc.
- Pirottaea dubia Ade
- Pirottaea exilispora Graddon
- Pirottaea falcata P.R.Johnst.
- Pirottaea fraxini Velen.
- Pirottaea frondicola (Ellis & Everh.) Sacc.
- Pirottaea gallica Sacc.
- Pirottaea geraniicola Nannf.
- Pirottaea glaucoviridis Vaček
- Pirottaea helvetica Arx
- Pirottaea hydrangeae (Schwein.) Sacc.
- Pirottaea imbricata Nannf.
- Pirottaea inopinata Nannf.
- Pirottaea intercedens Nannf.
- Pirottaea lamii Nannf.
- Pirottaea longipila Feltgen
- Pirottaea lychnidis (Desm. ex Sacc.) Chlebická
- Pirottaea malvae (Fautrey) Nannf.
- Pirottaea microspora Sacc., E.Bommer & M.Rousseau
- Pirottaea mimatensis Pass. & Roum.
- Pirottaea nigrostriata Graddon
- Pirottaea paupercula Nannf.
- Pirottaea persica Petr.
- Pirottaea pilosissima Nannf.
- Pirottaea plantaginis Graddon
- Pirottaea saxonica Nannf.
- Pirottaea scabiosicola Petr.
- Pirottaea scruposa Velen.
- Pirottaea senecionis (Cooke & W.Phillips) Nannf.
- Pirottaea strigosa (P.Karst.) Sacc.
- Pirottaea symphyti Nannf.
- Pirottaea tentaculata (Wallr.) Sacc.
- Pirottaea trichostoma (Kirschst.) E.Müll. & Arx
- Pirottaea uliginosa P.Karst.
- Pirottaea veneta Sacc. & Speg.
- Pirottaea versicolor Penz. & Sacc.
- Pirottaea yakutatiana Sacc.

== See also ==
- List of Dermateaceae genera
