= Cryptohymenium =

Scientific classification
- Kingdom: Fungi
- Division: Ascomycota
- Class: Leotiomycetes
- Order: Helotiales
- Family: Dermateaceae
- Genus: Cryptohymenium; Samuels & L.M. Kohn

Type species
- Cryptohymenium pycnidiophorum Samuels & L.M. Kohn

Genus of fungi

Cryptohymenium is a genus of fungi in the family Dermateaceae. This is a monotypic genus, containing the single species Cryptohymenium pycnidiophorum.

== See also ==
- List of Dermateaceae genera
