= Durandiella =

Scientific classification
- Kingdom: Fungi
- Division: Ascomycota
- Class: Leotiomycetes
- Order: Helotiales
- Family: Dermateaceae
- Genus: Durandiella; Seaver

Type species
- Peziza fraxini Schweinitz

Genus of fungi

Durandiella is a genus of fungi in the family Dermateaceae. The genus contains 10 species.

The genus name of Durandiella is in honour of Elias Judah Durand (1870–1922), who was an American mycologist and botanist.

The genus was circumscribed by Fred Jay Seaver in Mycologia Vol.24 (Issue 2) on page 261 in 1932.

== Species ==
- Durandiella alni
- Durandiella andromedae
- Durandiella callunae
- Durandiella fraxini
- Durandiella gallica
- Durandiella lenticellicola
- Durandiella nemopanthi
- Durandiella pseudotsugae
- Durandiella rosae
- Durandiella rugosa
- Durandiella salicis
- Durandiella seriata
- Durandiella sibirica
- Durandiella tsugae
- Durandiella viburnicola

== See also ==
- List of Dermateaceae genera
