= Hysteronaevia =

Scientific classification
- Kingdom: Fungi
- Division: Ascomycota
- Class: Leotiomycetes
- Order: Helotiales
- Family: Dermateaceae
- Genus: Hysteronaevia; Nannf.

Type species
- Hysteronaevia holoschoeni (De Not.) Nannf.

Genus of fungi

Hysteronaevia is a genus of fungi in the family Dermateaceae. The genus contains 11 species.

== Species ==
- Hysteronaevia advena
- Hysteronaevia cincturata
- Hysteronaevia clavulifera
- Hysteronaevia fimbriata
- Hysteronaevia holoschoeni
- Hysteronaevia kobayasii
- Hysteronaevia luzulicola
- Hysteronaevia minutissima
- Hysteronaevia olivacea
- Hysteronaevia scirpina
- Hysteronaevia stenospora

== See also ==
- List of Dermateaceae genera
