= Obtectodiscus =

Scientific classification
- Kingdom: Fungi
- Division: Ascomycota
- Class: Leotiomycetes
- Order: Helotiales
- Family: Dermateaceae
- Genus: Obtectodiscus; E.Müll., Petrini & Samuels (1980)

Type species
- Obtectodiscus aquaticus E. Müll., Petrini & Samuels (1980)

Species
- O.

Genus of fungi

Obtectodiscus is a genus of fungi in the family Dermateaceae. The genus contains two species.

== See also ==
- List of Dermateaceae genera
