= Diplonaevia =

Scientific classification
- Kingdom: Fungi
- Division: Ascomycota
- Class: Leotiomycetes
- Order: Helotiales
- Family: Dermateaceae
- Genus: Diplonaevia; Sacc.

Type species
- Diplonaevia caricum (Auersw.) Sacc.

Genus of fungi

Diplonaevia is a genus of fungi in the family Dermateaceae. The genus, first described by Italian mycologist Pier Andrea Saccardo in 1888, contains 23 species.

== See also ==
- List of Dermateaceae genera
