= Eupropolella =

Scientific classification
- Kingdom: Fungi
- Division: Ascomycota
- Class: Leotiomycetes
- Order: Helotiales
- Family: Dermateaceae
- Genus: Eupropolella; Höhn.

Type species
- Eupropolella vaccinii (Rehm) Höhn.

Species
- E. arctostaphyli E. arundinariae E. britannica E. celata E. diapensiae E. oxycocci E. vaccinii

Genus of fungi

Eupropolella is a genus of fungi in the family Dermateaceae. The genus contains 7 species.

== See also ==
- List of Dermateaceae genera
