= Involucroscypha =

Scientific classification
- Kingdom: Fungi
- Division: Ascomycota
- Class: Leotiomycetes
- Order: Helotiales
- Family: Dermateaceae
- Genus: Involucroscypha; Raitv.

Type species
- Involucroscypha involucrata (B. Erikss.) Raitv.

Genus of fungi

Involucroscypha is a genus of fungi in the family Dermateaceae. This is a monotypic genus, containing the single species Involucroscypha involucrata.

== See also ==
- List of Dermateaceae genera
