= Spilopodia =

Scientific classification
- Kingdom: Fungi
- Division: Ascomycota
- Class: Leotiomycetes
- Order: Helotiales
- Family: Dermateaceae
- Genus: Spilopodia; Boud.

Type species
- Spilopodia nervisequa (Pers.) Boud.

Genus of fungi

Spilopodia is a genus of fungi in the family Dermateaceae. The genus contains 4 species.

== See also ==
- List of Dermateaceae genera
