= Hysteropezizella =

Scientific classification
- Kingdom: Fungi
- Division: Ascomycota
- Class: Leotiomycetes
- Order: Helotiales
- Family: Dermateaceae
- Genus: Hysteropezizella; Höhn.

Type species
- Hysteropezizella subvelata (Rehm) Höhn.

Genus of fungi

Hysteropezizella is a genus of fungi in the family Dermateaceae. The genus, first described by F. von Höhnel in 1917, contains 19 species.

== See also ==
- List of Dermateaceae genera
