= Phialocephala =

Scientific classification
- Kingdom: Fungi
- Division: Ascomycota
- Class: Leotiomycetes
- Order: Helotiales
- Family: Mollisiaceae
- Genus: Phialocephala; W.B.Kendr.

Species
- see text

Genus of fungi

Phialocephala is a genus of fungi in the family Mollisiaceae. It has a worldwide distribution. It contains 39 accepted species and numerous undescribed taxa.

== Species ==
This section contains only accepted species.

- Phialocephala amethystea Tanney & Seifert, 2020
- Phialocephala aylmerensis Tanney & B.Douglas
- Phialocephala bamuru P.Wong & C.Dong
- Phialocephala botulispora (Cole & W.B.Kendr.) Grünig & T.N.Sieber
- Phialocephala canadensis W.B.Kendr.
- Phialocephala catenospora Tanney & B.Douglas
- Phialocephala cladophialophoroides Madrid, C.Tapia, V.Silva & Lafourc.
- Phialocephala compacta Kowalski & Kehr
- Phialocephala dimorphospora W.B.Kendr.
- Phialocephala europaea Grünig & T.N.Sieber
- Phialocephala fluminis Shearer, J.L.Crane & M.A.Mill.
- Phialocephala fortinii C.J.K.Wang & H.E.Wilcox
- Phialocephala fusca W.B.Kendr.
- Phialocephala gabalongii Sivasith.
- Phialocephala glacialis Grünig & T.N.Sieber
- Phialocephala helvetica Grünig & T.N.Sieber
- Phialocephala hiberna (Bills) M.J.Day & Currah
- Phialocephala humicola S.C.Jong & E.E.Davis
- Phialocephala lagerbergii (Melin & Nannf.) Grünig & T.N.Sieber
- Phialocephala letzii Grünig & T.N.Sieber
- Phialocephala mallochii Tanney & B.Douglas
- Phialocephala mexicana Onofri & Zucconi
- Phialocephala nodosa Tanney & B.Douglas
- Phialocephala oblonga (C.J.K.Wang & B.Sutton) Tanney, Seifert & B.Douglas
- Phialocephala piceae (T.N.Sieber & Grünig) Rossman
- Phialocephala queenslandica Matsush.
- Phialocephala repens (Cooke & Ellis) W.B.Kendr.
- Phialocephala scopiformis Kowalski & Kehr
- Phialocephala sphaeroides B.J.Wilson
- Phialocephala subalpina Grünig & T.N.Sieber
- Phialocephala trigonospora R.Kirschner & Oberw.
- Phialocephala turicensis Grünig & T.N.Sieber
- Phialocephala uotiloensis Grünig & T.N.Sieber
- Phialocephala urceolata Wei Wang & L.L.McGhee
- Phialocephala vermiculata Tanney & Seifert, 2020
- Phialocephala victorinii Vujan. & St-Arn.
- Phialocephala virens A.L.Siegfr. & Seifert
- Phialocephala vittalensis D'Souza, S.K.Singh & Bhat
- Phialocephala xalapensis Persiani & Maggi
