= Coleosperma =

Scientific classification
- Kingdom: Fungi
- Division: Ascomycota
- Class: Leotiomycetes
- Order: Helotiales
- Family: Dermateaceae
- Genus: Coleosperma; Ingold

Type species
- Coleosperma lacustre Ingold

Genus of fungi

Coleosperma is a genus of fungi in the family Dermateaceae. This is a monotypic genus, containing the single species Coleosperma lacustre.

== See also ==
- List of Dermateaceae genera
