= Haglundia =

Scientific classification
- Kingdom: Fungi
- Division: Ascomycota
- Class: Leotiomycetes
- Order: Helotiales
- Family: Dermateaceae
- Genus: Haglundia; Nannf.

Type species
- Haglundia perelegans Haglund ex Nannf.

Species
- H. crispula H. elegantior H. lanata H. magnipilosa H. olivacea H. penyardensis H. perelegans H. rubra H. sarmentorum H. testaceorufa

Genus of fungi

Haglundia is a genus of fungi in the family Dermateaceae. The genus contains 5 species.

== See also ==
- List of Dermateaceae genera
