= Drepanopeziza sphaerioides =

Scientific classification
- Kingdom: Fungi
- Division: Ascomycota
- Class: Leotiomycetes
- Order: Helotiales
- Family: Drepanopezizaceae
- Genus: Drepanopeziza
- Species: D. sphaerioides

Binomial name
- Drepanopeziza sphaerioides (Persoon) Höhnel, 1917

Species of fungus

Drepanopeziza sphaerioides is a species of fungus belonging to the family Drepanopezizaceae.

Synonym: Marssonina salicicola (Bres.) Magnus, 1906
