= Spilopodiella =

Scientific classification
- Kingdom: Fungi
- Division: Ascomycota
- Class: Leotiomycetes
- Order: Helotiales
- Family: Dermateaceae
- Genus: Spilopodiella; E. Müll.

Type species
- Spilopodiella arxii E. Müll.

Genus of fungi

Spilopodiella is a genus of fungi in the family Dermateaceae. This is a monotypic genus, containing the single species Spilopodiella arxii.

== See also ==
- List of Dermateaceae genera
