= Dennisiodiscus =

Scientific classification
- Kingdom: Fungi
- Division: Ascomycota
- Class: Leotiomycetes
- Order: Helotiales
- Family: Dermateaceae
- Genus: Dennisiodiscus; Svrcek

Type species
- Dennisiodiscus prasinus (Quél.) Svrček

Species
- D. cerberi D. crossotus D. hippocastani D. hooglandii D. insularis D. prasinus D. sedi

Genus of fungi

Dennisiodiscus is a genus of fungi in the family Dermateaceae. The genus contains 10 species.

The genus name of Dennisiodiscus is in honour of Richard William George Dennis (1910 - 2003), British botanist (mycology) and plant pathologist.

The genus was circumscribed by Mirko Svrček in Ceská Mykol. Vol.30 on page 9 in 1976, and then in Kew Bull. Vol.31 (Issues 3) on page 415 in 1977.

== See also ==
- List of Dermateaceae genera
