= Atropellis =

Scientific classification
- Kingdom: Fungi
- Division: Ascomycota
- Class: Leotiomycetes
- Order: Helotiales
- Family: Dermateaceae
- Genus: Atropellis; Zeller & Goodd. (1930)

Type species
- Atropellis pinicola Zeller & Goodd. (1930)

Species
- A. apiculata A. pinicola A. piniphila A. tingens

Genus of fungi

Atropellis is a genus of fungi in the family Dermateaceae. The genus contain four species.

== See also ==
- List of Dermateaceae genera
