= Calloriella =

Scientific classification
- Kingdom: Fungi
- Division: Ascomycota
- Class: Leotiomycetes
- Order: Helotiales
- Family: Dermateaceae
- Genus: Calloriella; Höhn.

Type species
- Calloriella umbrinella (Desm.) Höhn.

Species
- C. nipteroides C. umbrinella

Genus of fungi

Calloriella is a genus of fungi in the family Dermateaceae.

== See also ==
- List of Dermateaceae genera
