= Calloria =

Scientific classification
- Kingdom: Fungi
- Division: Ascomycota
- Class: Leotiomycetes
- Order: Helotiales
- Family: Dermateaceae
- Genus: Calloria; Fr.

Type species
- Calloria fusarioides (Berk.) Fr.

Genus of fungi

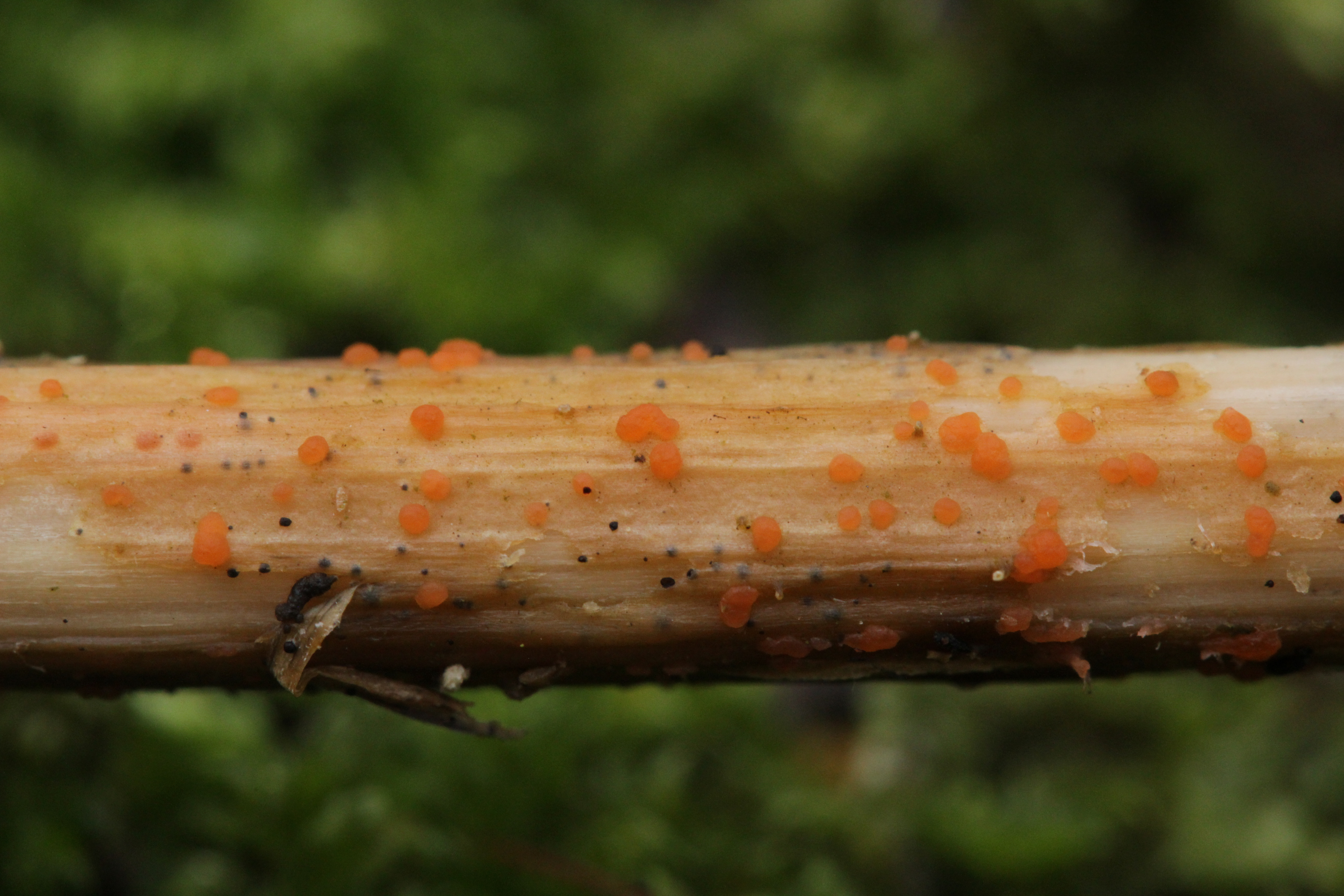
Calloria neglecta

Calloria is a genus of fungi in the family Dermateaceae. The genus, which was first described by Elias Magnus Fries in 1836, contains 4 species.

== See also ==
- List of Dermateaceae genera
