= Tuberculariella =

Scientific classification
- Kingdom: Fungi
- Division: Ascomycota
- Class: Leotiomycetes
- Order: Helotiales
- Family: Dermateaceae
- Genus: Tuberculariella; Höhn. 1915

Species
- Tuberculariella ambrosiae Tuberculariella betuli Tuberculariella brassicae Tuberculariella sanguinea

Genus of fungi

Tuberculariella is a genus of fungi in the family Dermateaceae.

== See also ==
- List of Dermateaceae genera
