= Patinella =

Scientific classification
- Kingdom: Fungi
- Division: Ascomycota
- Class: Leotiomycetes
- Order: Helotiales
- Family: Dermateaceae
- Genus: Patinella; Sacc.

Type species
- Patinella hyalophaea Sacc.

Genus of fungi

Patinella is a genus of fungi in the family Dermateaceae. The genus contains 3 species.

== See also ==
- List of Dermateaceae genera
