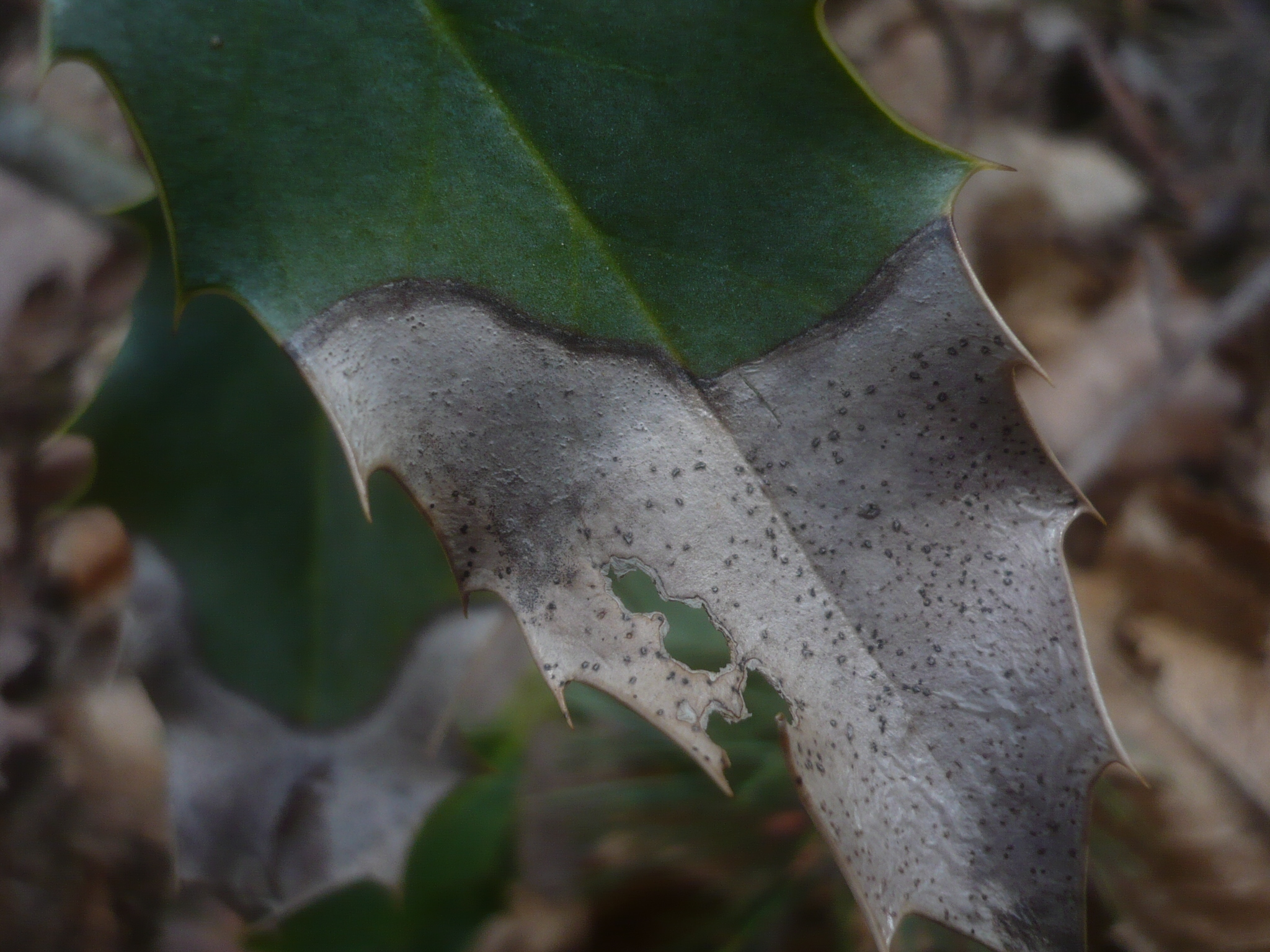
- Trochila ilicina

Scientific classification
- Kingdom: Fungi
- Division: Ascomycota
- Class: Leotiomycetes
- Order: Helotiales
- Family: Dermateaceae
- Genus: Trochila; Fr. (1849)

Type species
- Trochila craterium (DC.) Fr. (1849)

= Trochila =

Genus of fungi

Trochila is a genus of fungi in the family Dermateaceae. It was circumscribed by Elias Magnus Fries in 1849. The genus contains 15 species.

== Species ==
- Trochila astragali
- Trochila chilensis
- Trochila craterium
- Trochila ilicina
- Trochila jaffueli
- Trochila laurocerasi
- Trochila leopoldina
- Trochila majalis
- Trochila perseae
- Trochila phacidioides
- Trochila staritziana
- Trochila tami
- Trochila tetraspora
- Trochila verrucosa

== See also ==
- List of Dermateaceae genera
