= Drepanopeziza =

Scientific classification
- Kingdom: Fungi
- Division: Ascomycota
- Class: Leotiomycetes
- Order: Helotiales
- Family: Drepanopezizaceae
- Genus: Drepanopeziza (Kleb.) Höhn.

Type species
- Drepanopeziza populorum (Desm.) Höhn.

Genus of fungi

Drepanopeziza is a genus of fungi in the family Dermateaceae. The genus contains 14 species.

== Species ==
- Drepanopeziza campestris
- Drepanopeziza foliicola
- Drepanopeziza fuckelii
- Drepanopeziza paradoxoides
- Drepanopeziza populi-albae
- Drepanopeziza populorum
- Drepanopeziza punctiformis
- Drepanopeziza ribis
- Drepanopeziza salicis
- Drepanopeziza schoenicola
- Drepanopeziza sphaerioides
- Drepanopeziza tremulae
- Drepanopeziza triandrae
- Drepanopeziza variabilis
- Drepanopeziza verrucispora

== See also ==
- List of Dermateaceae genera
