= Pseudoniptera =

Scientific classification
- Kingdom: Fungi
- Division: Ascomycota
- Class: Leotiomycetes
- Order: Helotiales
- Family: Dermateaceae
- Genus: Pseudoniptera; Velen.

Type species
- Pseudoniptera quercina Velen.

Genus of fungi

Pseudoniptera is a genus of fungi in the family Dermateaceae. This is a monotypic genus, containing the single species Pseudoniptera quercina.

== See also ==
- List of Dermateaceae genera
