= Golfballia ambusta =

Mycological hoax using burnt golf balls

Golfballia ambusta is a purported species of fungus with specimens primarily kept at Kew Gardens, London. The specimens are not of organisms but burnt golf balls. In 1962, they were described as a new fungal species by R. W. G. Dennis, the head of mycology at Royal Botanic Gardens, Kew, possibly to challenge the mycological criteria in place as to what could be considered a fungus. Its binomial name is 'burnt golf ball' in Dog Latin.

== History ==
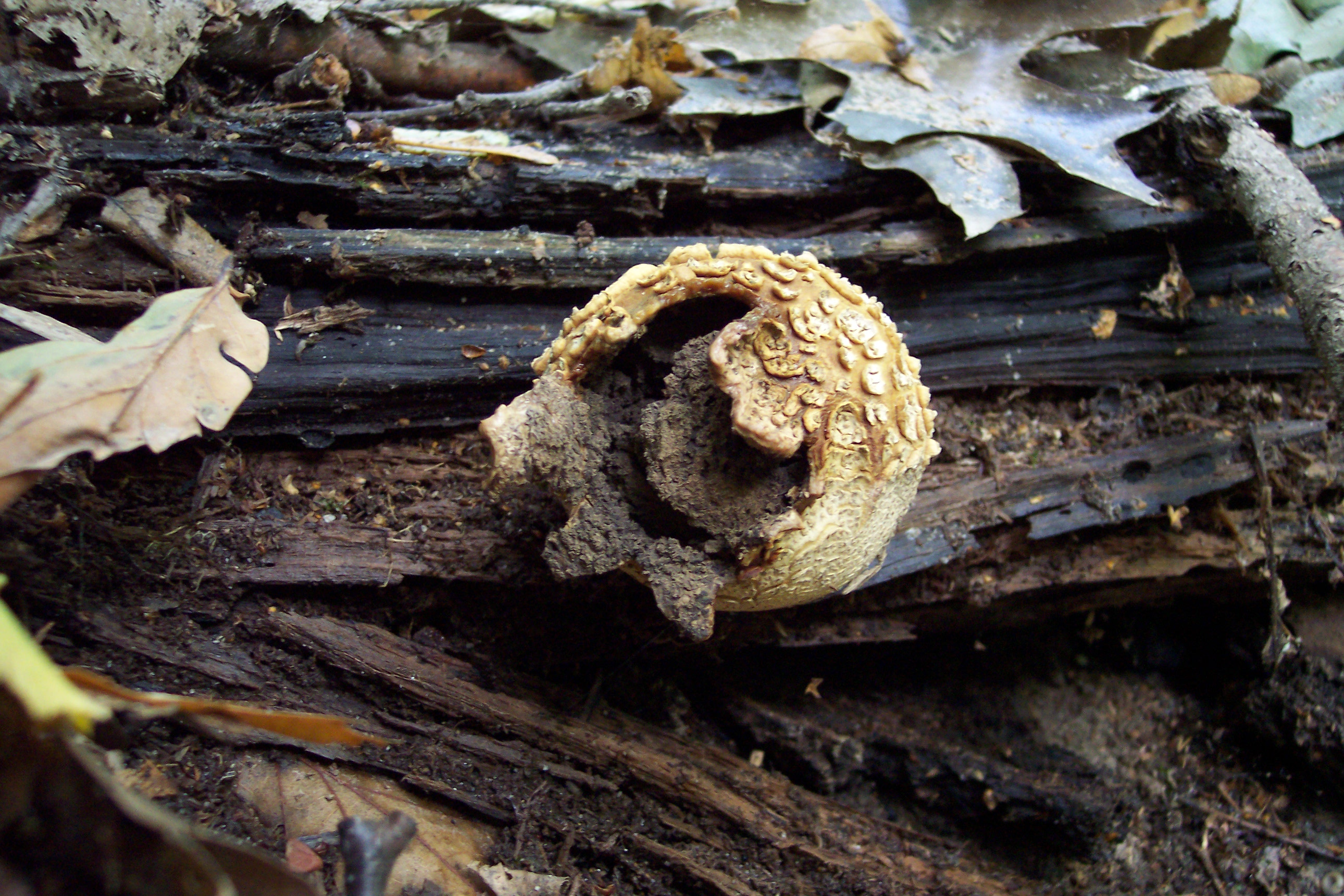
A mature Scleroderma citrinum sporocarp, resembling a burnt golf ball

In 1952, a burnt golf ball was submitted to mycologists from an anonymous source in Lancashire, northwest England, and deposited in the Fungarium at Kew Gardens, London. The submitter claimed it to be a specimen of a "rare fungal species" belonging to the genus Queletia, but mycologists thought its appearance more closely resembled Scleroderma citrinum, which has an irregular, nearly spherical sporocarp with thick leathery skin and colours that vary from white to tan or brown. The surface of a golf ball is dimpled and, when burned, its outer shell cracks to expose the rubber core, which is similar to the dark gleba of a mature S. citrinum sporocarp. Kew mycologists unsuccessfully attempted to collect spores from the specimen before realizing the nature of the hoax.

In 1962, a similar burnt golf ball arrived at Kew from East Africa. Subsequently, R. W. G. Dennis, the head of mycology at Kew, published a paper titled "A remarkable new genus of phalloid in Lancashire and East Africa" in the Journal of the Kew Guild, formally describing it as a new species of fungus. The article states that the specimens resemble "small, hard but elastic balls used in certain tribal rites of the Caledonians, which take place all season in enclosed paddocks with partially mown grass"; the description is likely a humorous allusion to golf, Caledonia being the Latin name for Scotland. Dennis described the specimens as having the odour of old or heated Indian rubber and stated that no spores were collected, leaving its method of reproduction unknown, and gave the purported species the binomial name Golfballia ambusta, an approximation of 'burnt golf ball' in Dog Latin. He may have published the article with the intention to "challenge the criteria in place at the time that could allow a non-life entity to be so easily submitted as a species".

A third burnt golf ball was sent to Kew from Kent in 1971, with the sender explicitly stating it was found at the edge of a fire. The three Golfballia ambusta specimens remain in the collection of Kew's fungarium, catalogued as K(M)230939 to K(M)230941.

In 2023, a new variety, Golfballia ambusta var. rushmerea, was described in the Journal of the Kew Guild. The type specimen was deposited in the herbarium of the National Museum of Wales, with additional specimens deposited at Kew Gardens. Ipswich Museum refused the offer of a specimen.

== Impact ==
Nathan Smith, a former head of the Kew fungarium, wrote that Golfballia ambusta holds significance among other academic hoaxes in mycology history, as it was officially described and published, with specimens formally archived in the fungarium; according to the International Code of Nomenclature for algae, fungi, and plants, it would be considered a valid fungal species. Smith referred to the hoax as mycology's "Dada moment", raising the question "what is a fungus".

Slime molds and oomycetes were originally considered to be fungi but are now known to be unrelated organisms. The taxonomic kingdom Fungi no longer includes them, but they are still studied by mycologists and are informally classified as fungi. Many mycologists including Nicholas Money have argued that the term should encompass all "micro-organisms studied by mycologists", a definition challenged by Dennis, who suggested that if mycologists could decide what is a fungus, the more important question becomes who is a mycologist.
