= Ascluella =

Scientific classification
- Kingdom: Fungi
- Division: Ascomycota
- Class: Leotiomycetes
- Order: Helotiales
- Family: Dermateaceae
- Genus: Ascluella; DiCosmo et al.

Type species
- Ascluella symplocina (P. Syd.) DiCosmo, Nag Raj & W.B. Kendr.

Genus of fungi

Ascluella is a genus of fungi in the family Dermateaceae. This is a monotypic genus, containing the single species Ascluella symplocina.

== See also ==
- List of Dermateaceae genera
