= Pezolepis =

Scientific classification
- Kingdom: Fungi
- Division: Ascomycota
- Class: Leotiomycetes
- Order: Helotiales
- Family: Dermateaceae
- Genus: Pezolepis; Syd.

Type species
- Pezolepis denigrata Syd.

Genus of fungi

Pezolepis is a genus of fungi in the family Dermateaceae. The genus contains 2 species.

== See also ==
- List of Dermateaceae genera
