= Josef Poelt =

German-Austrian academic botanist, bryologist and lichenologist

- Born: October 17, 1925; Pöcking
- Died: June 3, 1995 (aged 69); Graz
- Education: Ludwig-Maximilians-Universität München
- Scientific career
- Workplaces: Free University of Berlin; University of Graz
- Thesis: On holarctic lobate Lecanora species
- Doctoral advisors: Karl Suessenguth
- Doctoral students: Burghard Hein
- Author abbrev. (botany): Poelt

Josef Poelt was a botanist, bryologist and lichenologist. He held the chair in Systematic Botany and Plant Geography at the Free University of Berlin (1965–1972) and then was head of the Botanical Institute and Botanical Garden of Graz University, Austria (1972–1990).

== Early life and education ==
Josef Poelt was born in 1925 in the village of Pöcking in Bavaria, Germany, where his parents ran a guest house. He began to study botany at the Ludwig-Maximilians-Universität München, but he joined the German army and was assigned to an intelligence unit in Russia due to the start of the Second World War. After illness and time as a prisoner of war of the British, he returned to university study in 1946 and graduated with a bachelor's degree in natural sciences in 1950. Poelt was influenced by a botanist, H. Paul, to study non-flowering plants. He made use of the lichen herbarium at the university's botanic garden which contained nineteenth century specimens collected by Ferdinand Arnold and August von Krempelhuber. He later completed both his PhD (1950) and habilitation (1959) there.

== Career ==
He became an assistant at the botanic garden in Munich and from 1954 was curator of the cryptogam herbarium at the Botanische Staatssammlung München. In 1965, Poelt was appointed to the chair in Systematic Botany and Plant Geography at the Free University of Berlin to lead a new research institute. He was able to recruit staff, including Christian Leuckert, and install new facilities including for chemotaxonomy of lichens. He moved to the chair in Systematic Botany at the University of Graz in Austria in 1972. This was in part to be away from student unrest in Berlin. He was able to develop an international centre for cryptogam biology that included visiting researchers, an extensive herbarium and training programmes. He retired in 1990 but continued to work at University of Graz as an emeritus professor until his death in 1995.

Poelt specialised in the taxonomy, morphology, evolution and biology of lichens, especially the areas of lichen biology, correlations between structure and function, and evolutionary trends in lichens. His work from 1950 onwards provided modern, detailed and practical descriptions of lichen species. As well as microscopic features he also made use of chemical characteristics to circumscribe species. He made a significant contribution to the taxonomy of the Lecanoraceae, Physciaceae and the Teloschistaceae, as well as several other taxa. He also provided insights into the vegetative reproductive structures of lichens, described lichens that live on mosses (muscicolous species) and investigated species with cyanobacteria photobionts. He improved knowledge of parasitic lichens from that of vague and poorly understood organisms to where their biological and ecological strategies and characters were described clearly, and he identified many new taxa with this parasitic habit. Others often sent him samples of lichens for advice about identification. He also travelled widely to see lichens in the field, including to Brazil, Costa Rica, Greenland, Tierra del Fuego, Pakistan, Afghanistan and Nepal as well as all round Europe. In addition he had a very broad knowledge of general plant systematics and floristics.

Poelt edited and co-edited eleven exsiccatae. In 1956 he started the edition of his first series Lichenes Alpium et regionum confinium distributed by the Botanische Staatssammlung München. It was followed by a number of exsiccatae distributed through the University of Graz, among them, starting in 1977, the series Reliquiae Petrakianae with plant material collected by Franz Petrak.

== Publications ==
Poelt published his first paper in 1950, and was an author or co-author of at least 400 publications. These included around 200 about lichens. The book Bestimmungsschlüssel europäischer Flechten was published in 1969, an important key for identification of European lichens, followed by several supplements (1977, 1981) that he prepared in collaboration with others. His completion of a comprehensive account of the lichens of Austria was prevented by his sudden death. He was also the author or co-author of at least 100 publications on bryophytes, vascular plants and fungi.

== Honours and awards ==
He was elected as a member of the Bavarian Academy of Sciences in 1982. He was made an honorary member of the Regensburg Botanical Society, the world's oldest botanical society and a foreign member of the Linnean Society of London. He was also an honorary corresponding member of the Botanical Society of America. A festschrift was held to celebrate his birthday in 1985 when he was sixty. In 1992 he was awarded the Acharius Medal by the International Association for Lichenology in recognition of his long and distinguished service to lichenology.

Eight genera, including Poeltiaria, Poeltidea and the anagram Topelia, and 33 species have been named after him.

== Personal life ==
He married the mycologist Christa Meilhamer (1937–76) in 1959 and they had two children together. Poelt was an alpine mountaineer and good at yodelling.
