= Nothophacidium =

Scientific classification
- Kingdom: Fungi
- Division: Ascomycota
- Class: Leotiomycetes
- Order: Helotiales
- Family: Dermateaceae
- Genus: Nothophacidium; J. Reid & Cain

Type species
- Nothophacidium abietinellum J. Reid & Cain

Species
- N. abietinellum N. phyllophilum

Genus of fungi

Nothophacidium is a genus of fungi in the family Dermateaceae.

== See also ==
- List of Dermateaceae genera
