= Sorokinella =

Scientific classification
- Kingdom: Fungi
- Division: Ascomycota
- Class: Leotiomycetes
- Order: Helotiales
- Family: Dermateaceae
- Genus: Sorokinella; J. Fröhl. & K.D. Hyde

Type species
- Sorokinella appendicospora J. Fröhl. & K.D. Hyde

Genus of fungi

Sorokinella is a genus of fungi in the family Dermateaceae. The genus contains 2 species.

The genus was circumscribed by Jane Fröhlich and Kevin D. Hyde in Fungal Diversity Res. Ser.3 on page 122 in 2000.

The genus name of Sorokinella is in honour of Nikolai Vasilevich Sorokin (1846–1909), who was a Russian botanist, Mycologist, Microbiologist and Parasitologist. He was Professor of Botany and Director of the Botanical Garden of the Kazan Federal University.

== Species ==
As accepted by Species Fungorum;

- Sorokinella appendicospora J. Fröhl. & K.D. Hyde (2000)
- Sorokinella calami J. Fröhl. & K.D. Hyde (2000)

== See also ==
- List of Dermateaceae genera
