= Schizothyrioma =

Scientific classification
- Kingdom: Fungi
- Division: Ascomycota
- Class: Leotiomycetes
- Order: Helotiales
- Family: Dermateaceae
- Genus: Schizothyrioma; Höhn.

Type species
- Schizothyrioma ptarmicae (Desm.) Höhn.

Genus of fungi

Schizothyrioma is a genus of fungi in the family Dermateaceae. The genus contains 2 species.

== See also ==
- List of Dermateaceae genera
