= Ploettnera =

Scientific classification
- Kingdom: Fungi
- Division: Ascomycota
- Class: Leotiomycetes
- Order: Helotiales
- Family: Dermateaceae
- Genus: Ploettnera; P. Henn.

Type species
- Ploettnera caeruleoviridis (Rehm) Henn.

Genus of fungi

Ploettnera is a genus of fungi in the family Dermateaceae. The genus contains 5 species.

== See also ==
- List of Dermateaceae genera
