= Dermateopsis =

Scientific classification
- Kingdom: Fungi
- Division: Ascomycota
- Class: Leotiomycetes
- Order: Helotiales
- Family: Dermateaceae
- Genus: Dermateopsis; Nannf.

Type species
- Dermateopsis tabacina (Cooke) Nannf.

Species
- D. ionomidotica D. tabacina

Genus of fungi

Dermateopsis is a genus of fungi in the family Dermateaceae.

== See also ==
- List of Dermateaceae genera
