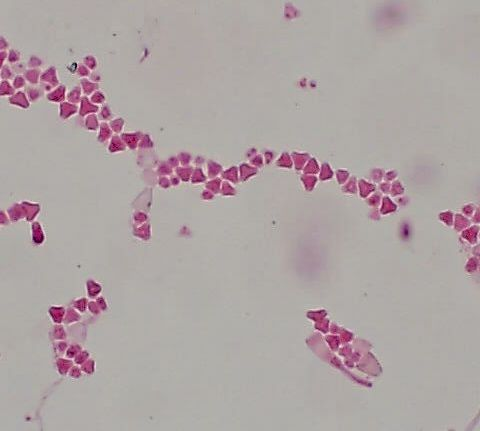
- Anthopsis deltoidea spores

Scientific classification
- Kingdom: Fungi
- Division: Ascomycota
- Class: Leotiomycetes
- Order: Helotiales
- Family: Dermateaceae
- Genus: Anthopsis [Fillipello Marchisio et al., A. Fontana & Luppi Moscai] (1977)

= Anthopsis =

Genus of fungi

Anthopsis is a genus of fungi in the family Dermateaceae containing 3 species. Colonies (PDA) grow slowly, are velvety to lanose, coloured olivaceous-grey to mouse grey with the reverse black.

== Microscopy ==
Phialides ovoidal, ellipsoidal, subspherical, or ampulliform, 5-8 x 2-3 μm, forming compact lateral clusters on undifferentiated hyphae; generally the distinctive collarette is located at the base of the phialide. Conidia triangular, smooth-walled, 2.0-3.5 μm long, usually adhering in dense masses.

== Species ==
According to Species Fungorum;

- Anthopsis catenata Oorschot, de Hoog & G. Schüler (1982)
- Anthopsis deltoidea Fil. March., A. Fontana & Luppi Mosca (1977)
- Anthopsis microspora K. Ando & Tubaki (1985)

== See also ==
- List of Dermateaceae genera
