= Pseudopeziza =

Scientific classification
- Kingdom: Fungi
- Division: Ascomycota
- Class: Leotiomycetes
- Order: Helotiales
- Family: Dermateaceae
- Genus: Pseudopeziza; Fuckel

Type species
- Pseudopeziza trifolii (Biv.) Fuckel

Species
- Pseudopeziza jonesii; Pseudopeziza medicaginis; Pseudopeziza trifolii

Genus of fungi

Pseudopeziza is a genus of fungi in the family Dermateaceae. The genus contains three species.

== See also ==
- List of Dermateaceae genera
