= Patellariopsis =

Scientific classification
- Kingdom: Fungi
- Division: Ascomycota
- Class: Leotiomycetes
- Order: Helotiales
- Family: Dermateaceae
- Genus: Patellariopsis; Dennis

Type species
- Patellariopsis clavispora (Berk. & Broome) Dennis

Genus of fungi

Patellariopsis is a genus of fungi in the family Dermateaceae. The genus contains 5 species.

== See also ==
- List of Dermateaceae genera
