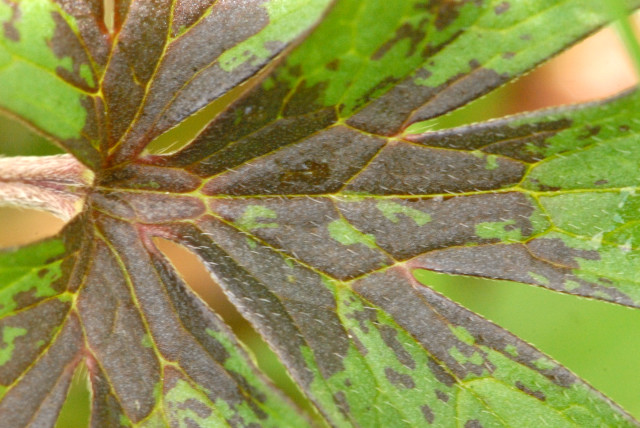
- Leptotrochila ranunculi from Belgium

Scientific classification
- Kingdom: Fungi
- Division: Ascomycota
- Class: Leotiomycetes
- Order: Helotiales
- Family: Dermateaceae
- Genus: Leptotrochila; P. Karst.

Type species
- Leptotrochila radians (Desm.) P. Karst. (1871)

= Leptotrochila =

Genus of fungi

Leptotrochila is a genus of fungi in the family Dermateaceae. The genus contains 16 species.

== Species ==
- Leptotrochila astrantiae
- Leptotrochila axillaris
- Leptotrochila bartsiae
- Leptotrochila cerastiorum
- Leptotrochila dehnii
- Leptotrochila euphrasiae
- Leptotrochila jasiones
- Leptotrochila lugubris
- Leptotrochila medicaginis
- Leptotrochila pedicularis
- Leptotrochila phyteumatis
- Leptotrochila porri
- Leptotrochila prunellae
- Leptotrochila radians
- Leptotrochila ranunculi
- Leptotrochila repanda
- Leptotrochila sanguisorbae
- Leptotrochila svalbardensis
- Leptotrochila trifolii-arvensis
- Leptotrochila verrucosa

== See also ==
- List of Dermateaceae genera
