= Crustomollisia =

Scientific classification
- Kingdom: Fungi
- Division: Ascomycota
- Class: Leotiomycetes
- Order: Helotiales
- Family: Dermateaceae
- Genus: Crustomollisia; Svrcek

Type species
- Crustomollisia roburnea (Velen.) Svrček

Genus of fungi

Crustomollisia is a genus of fungi in the family Dermateaceae. This is a monotypic genus, containing the single species Crustomollisia roburnea.

== See also ==
- List of Dermateaceae genera
