= Podophacidium =

Scientific classification
- Kingdom: Fungi
- Division: Ascomycota
- Class: Leotiomycetes
- Order: Helotiales
- Family: Dermateaceae
- Genus: Podophacidium; Niessl (1868)

Type species
- Podophacidium xanthomelum (Pers.) Kavina (1936)

Species
- P. pulvinatum P. xanthomelum

Synonyms
- Melachroia Boud. (1885)

Genus of fungi

Podophacidium is a genus of fungi in the family Dermateaceae that contains two species found in Europe and North America. The type species, originally called Podophacidium terrestre Niessl, is currently known as Podophacidium xanthomelum.

== See also ==
- List of Dermateaceae genera
