= Felisbertia =

Scientific classification
- Kingdom: Fungi
- Division: Ascomycota
- Class: Leotiomycetes
- Order: Helotiales
- Family: Dermateaceae
- Genus: Felisbertia; Viégas

Type species
- Felisbertia melastomacearum (Speg.) Viégas

Genus of fungi

Felisbertia is a genus of fungi in the family Dermateaceae. This is a monotypic genus, containing the single species Felisbertia melastomacearum.

== See also ==
- List of Dermateaceae genera
