= Laetinaevia =

Scientific classification
- Kingdom: Fungi
- Division: Ascomycota
- Class: Leotiomycetes
- Order: Helotiales
- Family: Dermateaceae
- Genus: Laetinaevia; Nannf.

Type species
- Laetinaevia lapponica (Nannf.) Nannf.

Genus of fungi

Laetinaevia is a genus of fungi in the family Dermateaceae. The genus contains 13 species.

== Species ==
- Laetinaevia adonis
- Laetinaevia alpina
- Laetinaevia blechni
- Laetinaevia bresadolae
- Laetinaevia carneoflavida
- Laetinaevia caulophylli
- Laetinaevia colobanthi
- Laetinaevia erythrostigma
- Laetinaevia fagicola
- Laetinaevia lapponica
- Laetinaevia longispora
- Laetinaevia luzulae
- Laetinaevia marina
- Laetinaevia minutissima
- Laetinaevia minutula
- Laetinaevia myriospora
- Laetinaevia pustulata
- Laetinaevia sedi
- Laetinaevia setosa
- Laetinaevia stellariae
- Laetinaevia triglochinis
- Laetinaevia veratri

== See also ==
- List of Dermateaceae genera
