= Obscurodiscus =

Scientific classification
- Kingdom: Fungi
- Division: Ascomycota
- Class: Leotiomycetes
- Order: Helotiales
- Family: Dermateaceae
- Genus: Obscurodiscus; Raitv.

Type species
- Obscurodiscus myricae (P. Karst.) Raitv.

Genus of fungi

Obscurodiscus is a genus of fungi in the family Dermateaceae. This is a monotypic genus, containing the single species Obscurodiscus myricae.

== See also ==
- List of Dermateaceae genera
