= Scleropezicula =

Scientific classification
- Kingdom: Fungi
- Division: Ascomycota
- Class: Leotiomycetes
- Order: Helotiales
- Family: Dermateaceae
- Genus: Scleropezicula; Verkley

Type species
- Scleropezicula alnicola Verkley

Genus of fungi

Scleropezicula is a genus of fungi in the family Dermateaceae. This is a monotypic genus, containing the single species Scleropezicula alnicola.

== See also ==
- List of Dermateaceae genera
