= Pleoscutula =

Scientific classification
- Kingdom: Fungi
- Division: Ascomycota
- Class: Leotiomycetes
- Order: Helotiales
- Family: Dermateaceae
- Genus: Pleoscutula; Vou.

Type species
- Pleoscutula arsenii Vouaux

Genus of fungi

Pleoscutula is a genus of fungi in the family Dermateaceae. The genus contains 2 species.

== See also ==
- List of Dermateaceae genera
