= Coronellaria =

Scientific classification
- Kingdom: Fungi
- Division: Ascomycota
- Class: Leotiomycetes
- Order: Helotiales
- Family: Dermateaceae
- Genus: Coronellaria; P. Karst.

Type species
- Coronellaria delitschiana (Auersw.) P. Karst.

Genus of fungi

Coronellaria is a genus of fungi in the family Dermateaceae. The genus contains 4 species.

== Species ==
- Coronellaria aberrans
- Coronellaria acori
- Coronellaria amaena
- Coronellaria amoena
- Coronellaria benkertii
- Coronellaria caricinella
- Coronellaria castanopsidis
- Coronellaria delitschiana
- Coronellaria lunata
- Coronellaria musicola
- Coronellaria pulicaris
- Coronellaria typhae

== See also ==
- List of Dermateaceae genera
