= Naeviopsis =

Scientific classification
- Kingdom: Fungi
- Division: Ascomycota
- Class: Leotiomycetes
- Order: Helotiales
- Family: Dermateaceae
- Genus: Naeviopsis; B. Hein

Type species
- Naeviopsis epilobii (P. Karst.) B. Hein

Genus of fungi

Naeviopsis is a genus of fungi in the family Dermateaceae. The genus contains 15 species. The genus was first established in 1976 by Bernhard Hein.

== See also ==
- List of Dermateaceae genera
