= Waltonia (fungus) =

Scientific classification
- Kingdom: Fungi
- Division: Ascomycota
- Class: Leotiomycetes
- Order: Helotiales
- Family: Dermateaceae
- Genus: Waltonia; Saho

Type species
- Waltonia pinicola Saho

Genus of fungi

Waltonia is a genus of fungi in the family Dermateaceae. This is a monotypic genus, containing the single species Waltonia pinicola.

== See also ==
- List of Dermateaceae genera
