= Hysterostegiella =

Scientific classification
- Kingdom: Fungi
- Division: Ascomycota
- Class: Leotiomycetes
- Order: Helotiales
- Family: Dermateaceae
- Genus: Hysterostegiella; Höhn.

Type species
- Hysterostegiella fenestrata (Roberge ex Desm.) Höhn.

Genus of fungi

Hysterostegiella is a genus of fungi in the family Dermateaceae. The genus contains 10 species.

== Species ==
- Hysterostegiella crassomarginata
- Hysterostegiella dowardensis
- Hysterostegiella dumeti
- Hysterostegiella fenestrata
- Hysterostegiella hydrophila
- Hysterostegiella juniperina
- Hysterostegiella lapponica
- Hysterostegiella lauri
- Hysterostegiella quercea
- Hysterostegiella typhae
- Hysterostegiella valvata
- Hysterostegiella zelendarkensis

== See also ==
- List of Dermateaceae genera
