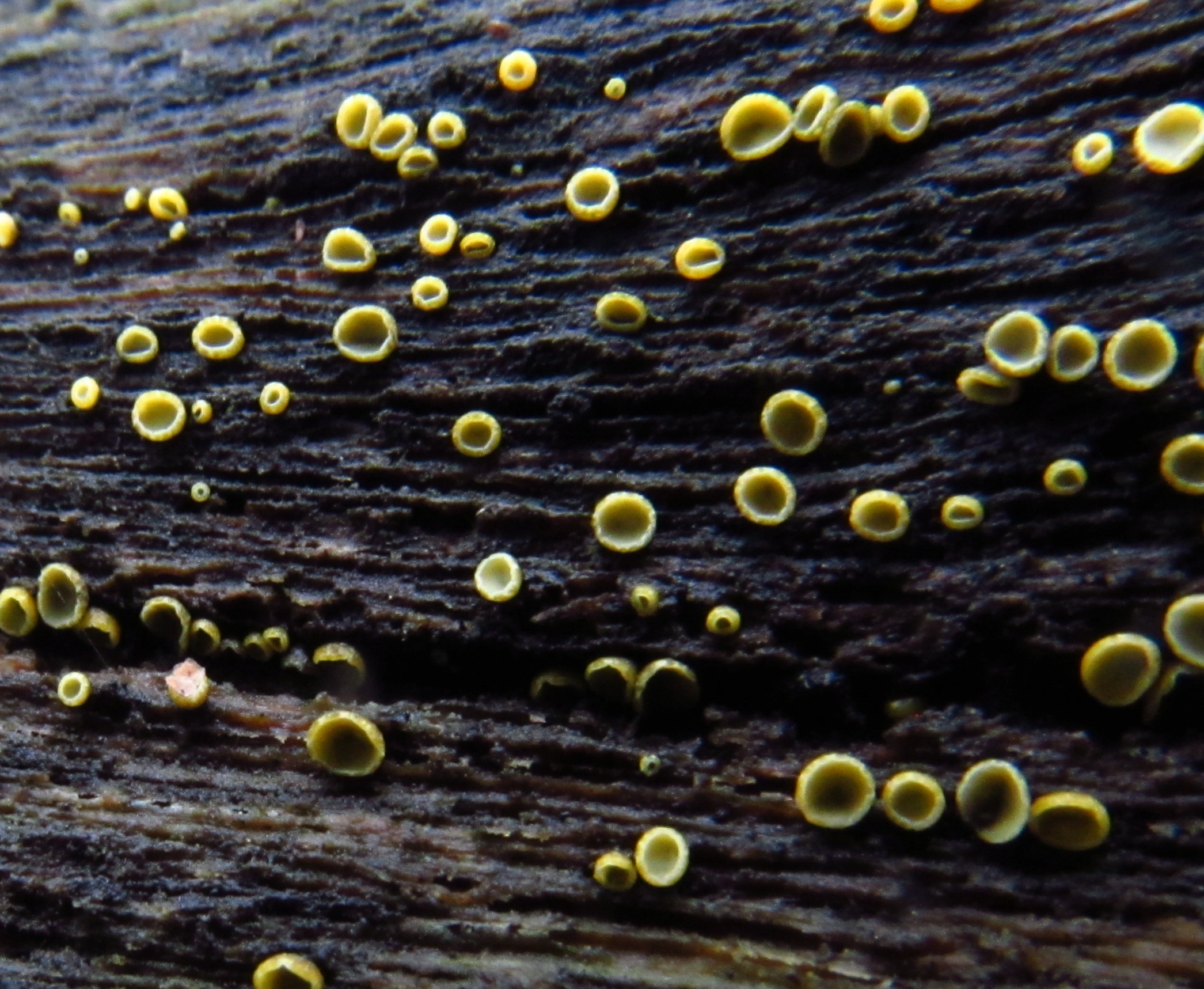
- Chlorosplenium chlora

Scientific classification
- Kingdom: Fungi
- Division: Ascomycota
- Class: Leotiomycetes
- Order: Helotiales
- Family: Chlorospleniaceae; Ekanayaka & K.D.Hyde (2019)
- Genus: Chlorosplenium; Fr. (1849)

Type species
- Chlorosplenium chlora (Schwein.) M.A.Curtis (1849)

= Chlorosplenium =

Genus of fungi

Chlorosplenium is the sole genus in the fungal family Chlorospleniaceae. The genus was circumscribed by Elias Magnus Fries in 1849.

== Species ==
As of September 2025, the nomenclatural authority Index Fungorum accepts 19 species of Chlorosplenium:

- Chlorosplenium atroviride Bres. (1906)
- Chlorosplenium caesioluteum (Berk. & Broome) Dennis (1963)
- Chlorosplenium cenangium (De Not.) Korf (1977)
- Chlorosplenium chlora (Schwein.) M.A.Curtis (1856)
- Chlorosplenium chlorophanum (M.Rousseau & De Not.) Boud. (1907)
- Chlorosplenium foliaceum (Starbäck) Rick (1931)
- Chlorosplenium fusisporum Liou & Z.C.Chen (1977)
- Chlorosplenium hyperici-maculati Svrček (1992)
- Chlorosplenium hypochlorum (Berk. & M.A.Curtis) J.R. Dixon (1974)
- Chlorosplenium indicum Dumont, Korf & H.Singh (1974)
- Chlorosplenium microspermum Henn. 1902)
- Chlorosplenium olivaceum Rick (1931)
- Chlorosplenium rodwayi Korf (1959)
- Chlorosplenium rugipes (Peck) Korf (1959)
- Chlorosplenium sinicum H.D.Zheng & W.Y.Zhuang (2021)
- Chlorosplenium sinochlorum H.D.Zheng & W.Y.Zhuang (2021)
- Chlorosplenium stemmatum (P.Karst.) P.Karst. (1873)
- Chlorosplenium viride (Schwein.) Morgan (1902)
- Chlorosplenium viridulum (Massee & Morgan) Dennis (1963)
