= Sarconiptera =

Scientific classification
- Kingdom: Fungi
- Division: Ascomycota
- Class: Leotiomycetes
- Order: Helotiales
- Family: Dermateaceae
- Genus: Sarconiptera; Raitv.

Type species
- Sarconiptera vinacea Raitv.

Genus of fungi

Sarconiptera is a genus of fungi in the family Dermateaceae. This is a monotypic genus, containing the single species Sarconiptera vinacea.

== See also ==
- List of Dermateaceae genera
