= Pseudonaevia =

Scientific classification
- Kingdom: Fungi
- Division: Ascomycota
- Class: Leotiomycetes
- Order: Helotiales
- Family: Dermateaceae
- Genus: Pseudonaevia; Dennis & Spooner

Type species
- Pseudonaevia caricina Dennis & Spooner

Genus of fungi

Pseudonaevia is a genus of fungi in the family Dermateaceae. This is a monotypic genus, containing the single species Pseudonaevia caricina.

== See also ==
- List of Dermateaceae genera
