= Naevala =

Scientific classification
- Kingdom: Fungi
- Division: Ascomycota
- Class: Leotiomycetes
- Order: Helotiales
- Family: Dermateaceae
- Genus: Naevala; B. Hein

Type species
- Naevala minutissima (Auersw.) B. Hein

Genus of fungi

Naevala is a genus of fungi in the family Dermateaceae. The genus contains 6 species, including Naevala perexigua. The genus was first established in 1976 by Bernhard Hein.

== See also ==
- List of Dermateaceae genera
