= Naeviella =

Scientific classification
- Domain: Eukaryota
- Kingdom: Fungi
- Division: Ascomycota
- Class: Leotiomycetes
- Order: Rhytismatales
- Family: Calloriaceae
- Genus: Naeviella; Clem. (1909)

Type species
- Naeviella paradoxa (Rehm) Clem. (1909)

Species
- N. paradoxa N. poeltiana N. volkartiana

Genus of fungi

Naeviella is a genus of fungi in the family Calloriaceae. It has three species. The genus was circumscribed by American plant ecologist Frederic Clements in 1909.

== Species ==
- Naeviella paradoxa (Rehm) Clem. (1909)
- Naeviella poeltiana Scheuer (1988)
- Naeviella volkartiana (Rehm) Nannf. (1982)
