= Discocurtisia =

Scientific classification
- Kingdom: Fungi
- Division: Ascomycota
- Class: Leotiomycetes
- Order: Helotiales
- Family: Dermateaceae
- Genus: Discocurtisia; Nannf.

Type species
- Discocurtisia arundinariae (Berk. & M.A. Curtis) Nannf.

Genus of fungi

Discocurtisia is a genus of fungi in the family Dermateaceae. This is a monotypic genus, containing the single species Discocurtisia arundinariae.

== See also ==
- List of Dermateaceae genera
