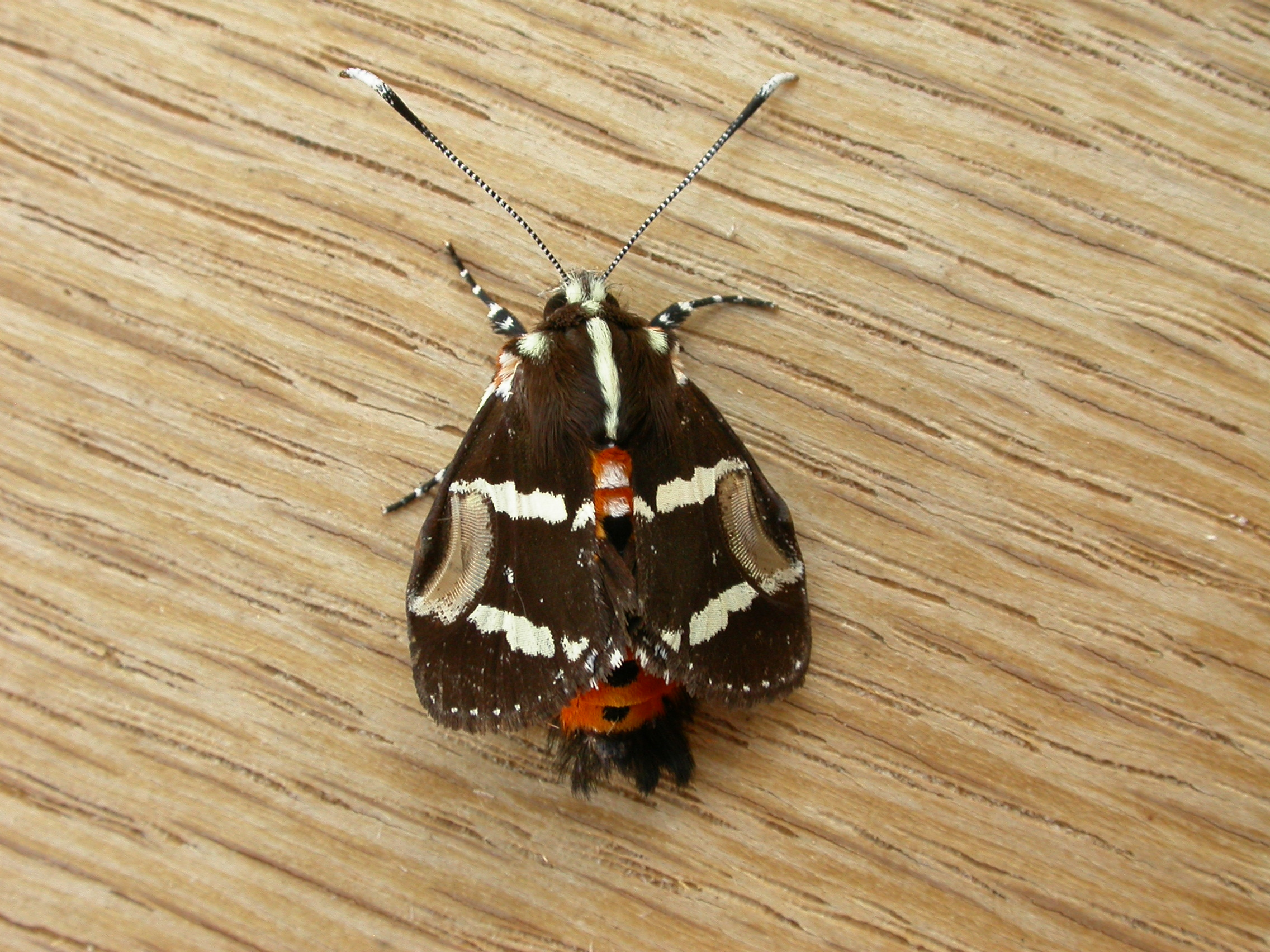
- Male
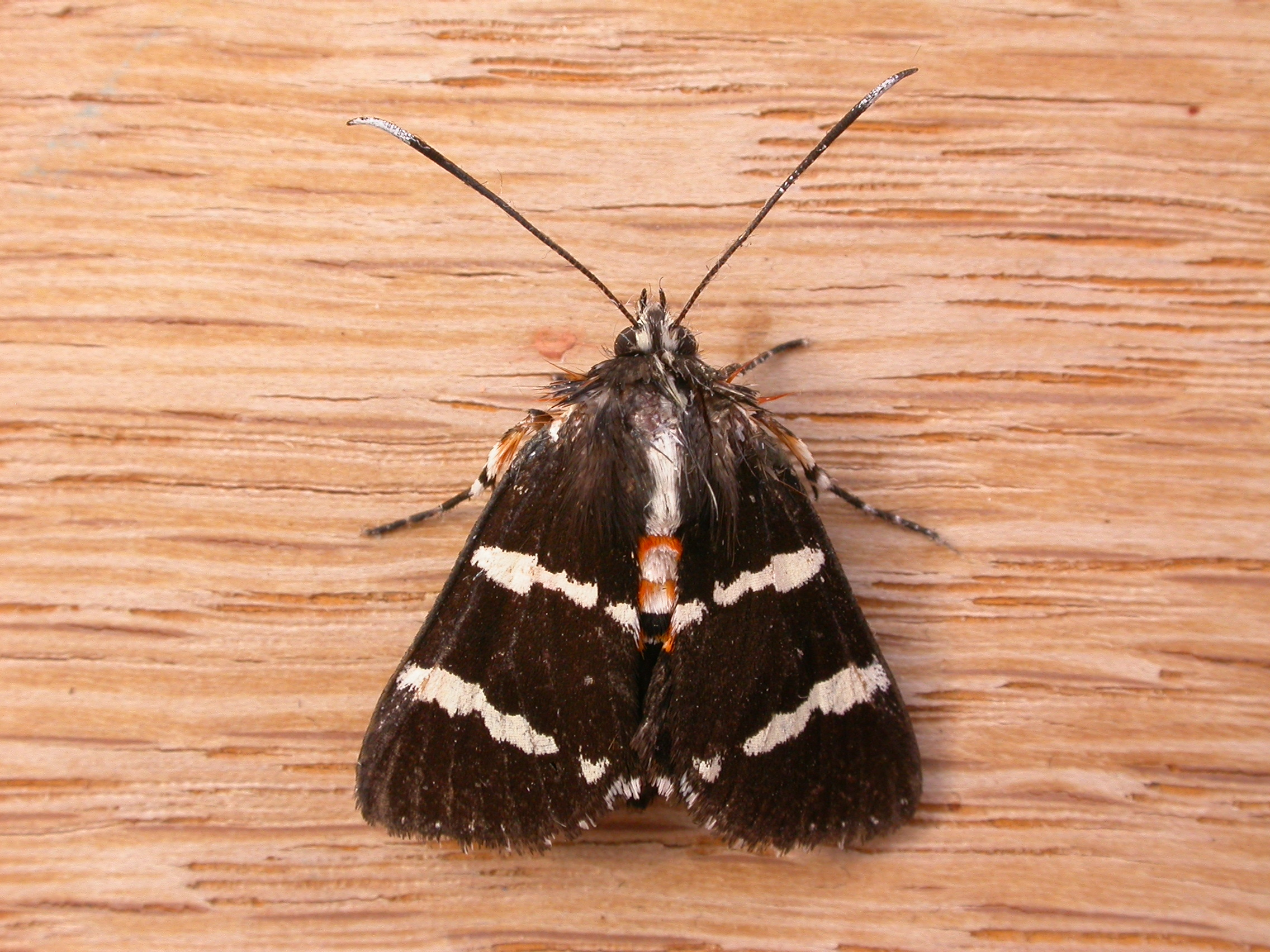
- Female

Scientific classification
- Domain: Eukaryota
- Kingdom: Animalia
- Phylum: Arthropoda
- Class: Insecta
- Order: Lepidoptera
- Superfamily: Noctuoidea
- Family: Noctuidae
- Genus: Hecatesia
- Species: H. fenestrata

Binomial name
- Hecatesia fenestrata Boisduval, 1829

= Hecatesia fenestrata =

Species of moth

Hecatesia fenestrata, the common whistling moth, is a moth of the family Noctuidae. It is endemic to south-eastern Australia.

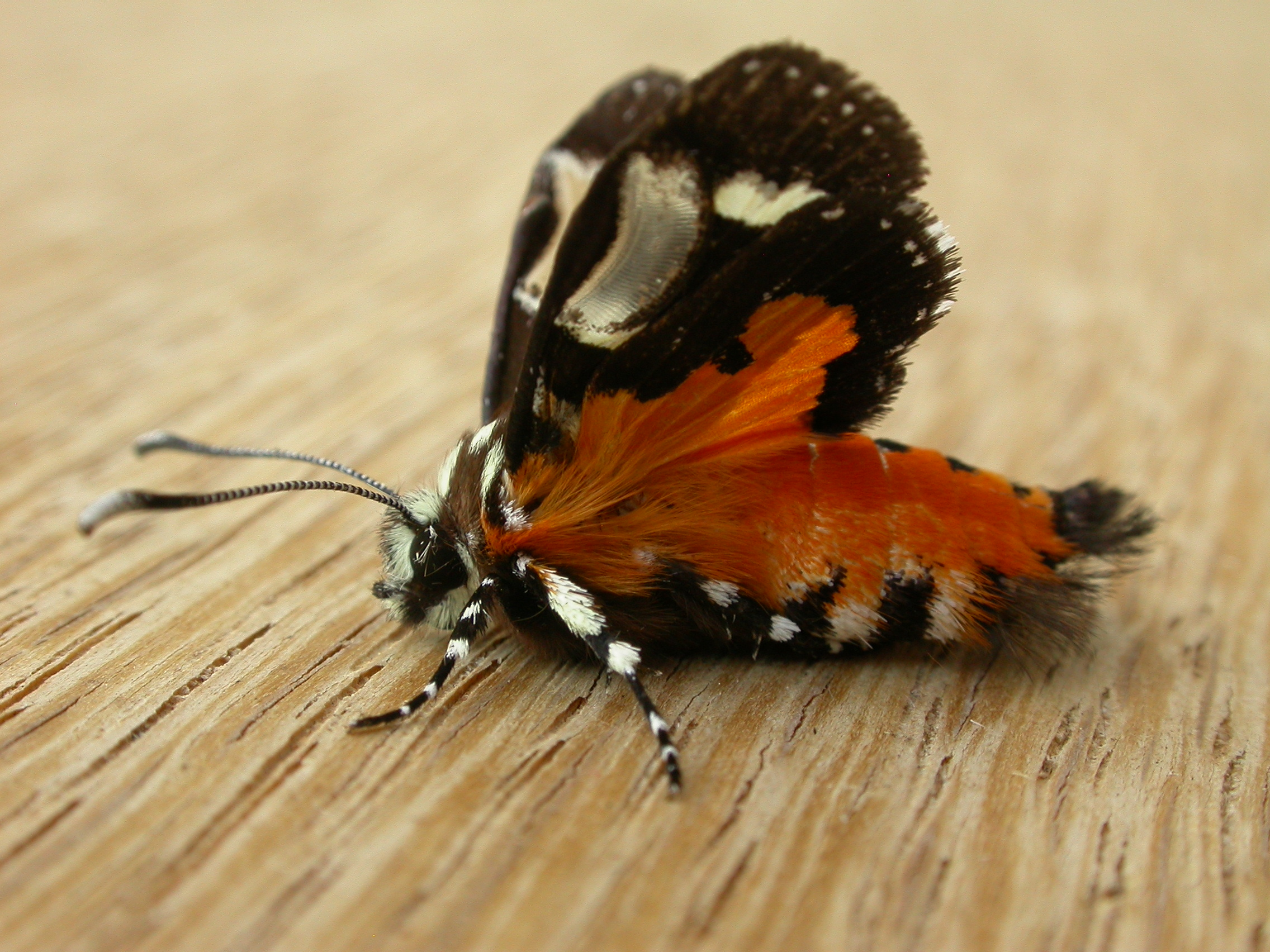
Male, side view

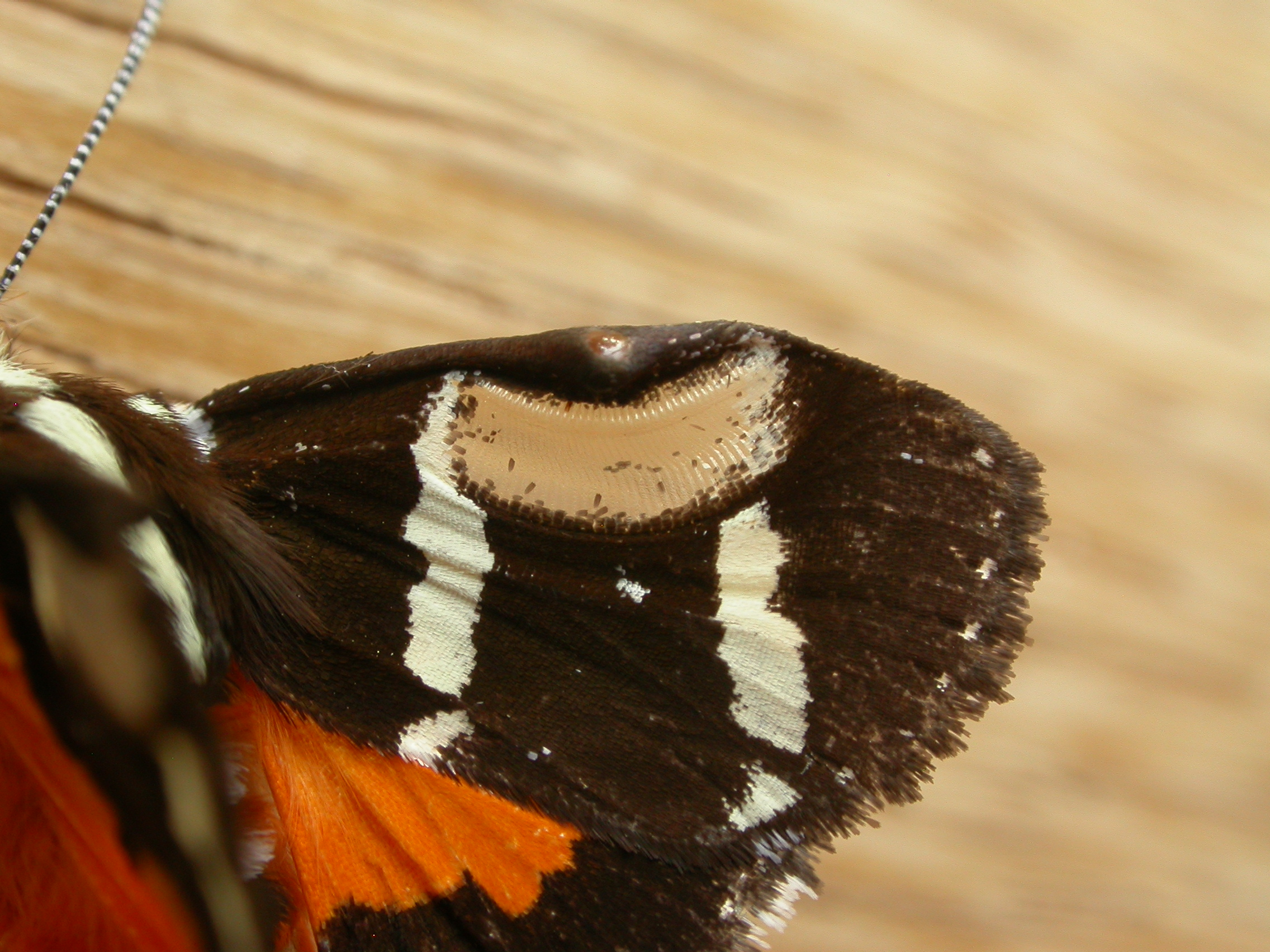
Wing detail
