= Niptera =

Scientific classification
- Kingdom: Fungi
- Division: Ascomycota
- Class: Leotiomycetes
- Order: Helotiales
- Family: Dermateaceae
- Genus: Niptera; Fr.

Type species
- Niptera lacustris sensu Fuckel; fide Saccardo

Genus of fungi

Niptera (syn. Nimbomollisia) is a genus of fungi in the family Dermateaceae. The genus contains 5 species.

== See also ==
- List of Dermateaceae genera
