= Neotapesia =

Scientific classification
- Kingdom: Fungi
- Division: Ascomycota
- Class: Leotiomycetes
- Order: Helotiales
- Family: Dermateaceae
- Genus: Neotapesia; E. Müll. & Hütter

Type species
- Neotapesia graddonii E. Müll. & Hütter

Genus of fungi

Neotapesia is a genus of fungi in the family Dermateaceae. The genus contains 3 species.

== See also ==
- List of Dermateaceae genera
