= Scutobelonium =

Scientific classification
- Kingdom: Fungi
- Division: Ascomycota
- Class: Leotiomycetes
- Order: Helotiales
- Family: Dermateaceae
- Genus: Scutobelonium; Graddon

Type species
- Scutobelonium amorilens Graddon

Genus of fungi

Scutobelonium is a genus of fungi in the family Dermateaceae. This is a monotypic genus, containing the single species Scutobelonium amorilens.

== See also ==
- List of Dermateaceae genera
