= Scutomollisia =

Scientific classification
- Kingdom: Fungi
- Division: Ascomycota
- Class: Leotiomycetes
- Order: Helotiales
- Family: Dermateaceae
- Genus: Scutomollisia; Nannf.

Type species
- Scutomollisia punctum (Rehm) Nannf.

Genus of fungi

Scutomollisia is a genus of fungi in the family Dermateaceae. The genus contains 14 species.

== See also ==
- List of Dermateaceae genera
