= Pyrenopeziza =

Scientific classification
- Kingdom: Fungi
- Division: Ascomycota
- Class: Leotiomycetes
- Order: Helotiales
- Family: Dermateaceae
- Genus: Pyrenopeziza; Fuckel

Type species
- Pyrenopeziza chailletii (Pers.) Fuckel

Genus of fungi

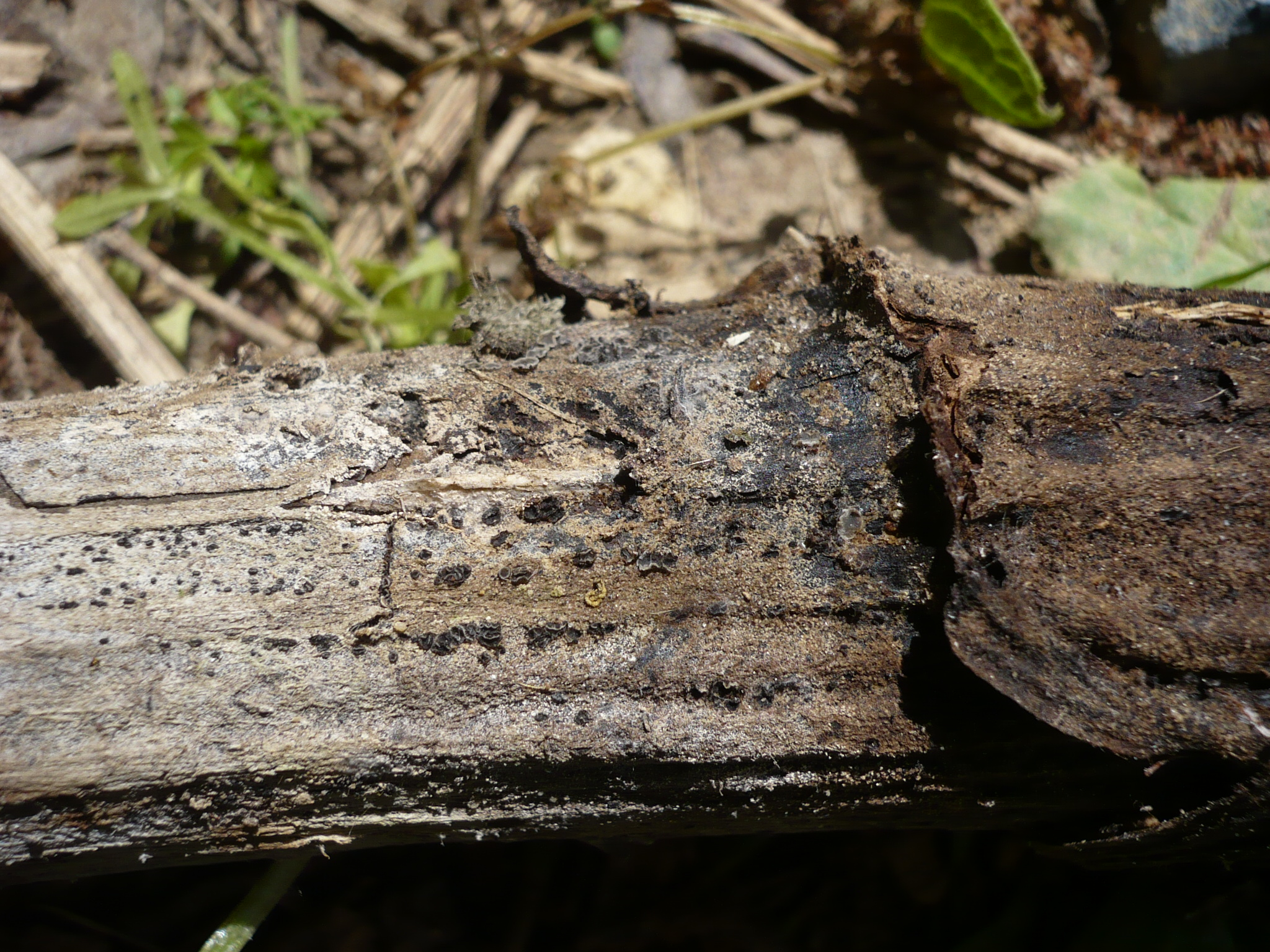
Pyrenopeziza arctii (W. Phillips) Nannf

Pyrenopeziza is a genus of fungi in the family Dermateaceae. The genus contains 59 species.

Synonym: Excipula Fr., 1823.

== Selected species ==
- Pyrenopeziza brassicae — cause of light leaf spot

== See also ==
- List of Dermateaceae genera
