= R. W. G. Dennis =

British mycologist (1910–2003)

Richard William George Dennis
- Born: 13 July 1910; Thornbury, Gloucestershire
- Died: 7 June 2003 (aged 92)
- Known for: Contributions to taxonomic mycology and plant pathology
- Scientific career
- Fields: Mycology
- Workplaces: Royal Botanic Gardens, Kew
- Author abbrev. (botany): Dennis

Richard William George Dennis, PhD (13 July 1910 – 7 June 2003), was an English mycologist and plant pathologist.

== Background and education ==
Dennis was born in Thornbury, Gloucestershire, the son of a schoolmaster. He was educated at Thornbury Grammar School and Bristol University, where he studied geology and botany, writing a thesis on canker disease of willow. In 1930, he obtained a post in the Plant Husbandry Department of the West of Scotland Agricultural College in Glasgow, where he studied diseases of oats. This became the subject of his PhD from the University of Glasgow in 1934.

== Career and travels ==
In 1939, Dr Dennis secured a post as Assistant Plant Pathologist at the Department of Agriculture, Edinburgh. He returned to England in 1944 and became assistant to Elsie Maud Wakefield, head of mycology at the Royal Botanic Gardens, Kew. On her retirement in 1951, R.W.G. Dennis took over her position and remained at Kew till his own retirement in 1975.

His early publications reflected his work as a plant pathologist, but at Kew he developed an interest and expertise in fungal taxonomy, with particular reference to the ascomycetes. His research resulted in a series of papers, culminating in the publication of British cup fungi and their allies in 1960, subsequently revised and expanded as British Ascomycetes. He also undertook a checklist of the British basidiomycetes with agaricologist Arthur Anselm Pearson, published in 1948. A new and much revised, critical checklist, with P. D. Orton and F. B. Hora, followed in 1960.

In 1949, Dennis had the opportunity to visit and collect fungi in Trinidad and Jamaica and in 1958 he collected in Venezuela. These field trips produced a number of significant papers, leading up to the Fungus flora of Venezuela and adjacent countries, a substantial reference work that remains a standard text today.

In 1962, he described Golfballia ambusta. The hoax species was described from a collection of burnt golf balls and, according to the International Code of Nomenclature for algae, fungi, and plants, is a validly described species. It has been described as mycology's "Dada moment".

He had long been interested in the Hebrides (and their fungi) and was able to pursue his love of the islands with a series of field trips after his retirement. These gave rise to a series of papers, followed by a comprehensive checklist, Fungi of the Hebrides, in 1986. He continued to work at Kew as an Honorary Research Fellow, publishing his last paper in 1999.

Altogether, R.W.G. Dennis published over 200 books and papers between 1931 and 1999, describing a substantial number of new fungal species. The genera Dennisiella Bat. & Cif., Dennisiodiscus Svrcek, Dennisiomyces Singer, Dennisiopsis Subram. & Chandrash., and Dennisographium Rifai are named after him, as are no fewer than 40 fungal species.

== Selected publications ==
- Dennis, R.W.G., Orton, P.D., & Hora, F.B. (1960). New checklist of British agarics and boleti. Supplement to Transactions of the British Mycological Society
- Dennis, R.W.G. (1962). A remarkable new genus of phalloid in Lancashire and East Africa, Journal of the Kew Guild. 8(67):181-182
- Dennis, R.W.G. (1970). Fungus flora of Venezuela and adjacent countries. London: HMSO
- Dennis, R.W.G. (1978) British Ascomycetes. Vaduz: J.Cramer
- Dennis, R.W.G. (1986) Fungi of the Hebrides. Kew: Royal Botanic Gardens
- Dennis, R.W.G. (1995) Fungi of South East England. Kew: Royal Botanic Gardens
- Wakefield, E.M. & Dennis, R.W G. (1950). Common British Fungi. London: Gawthorn
