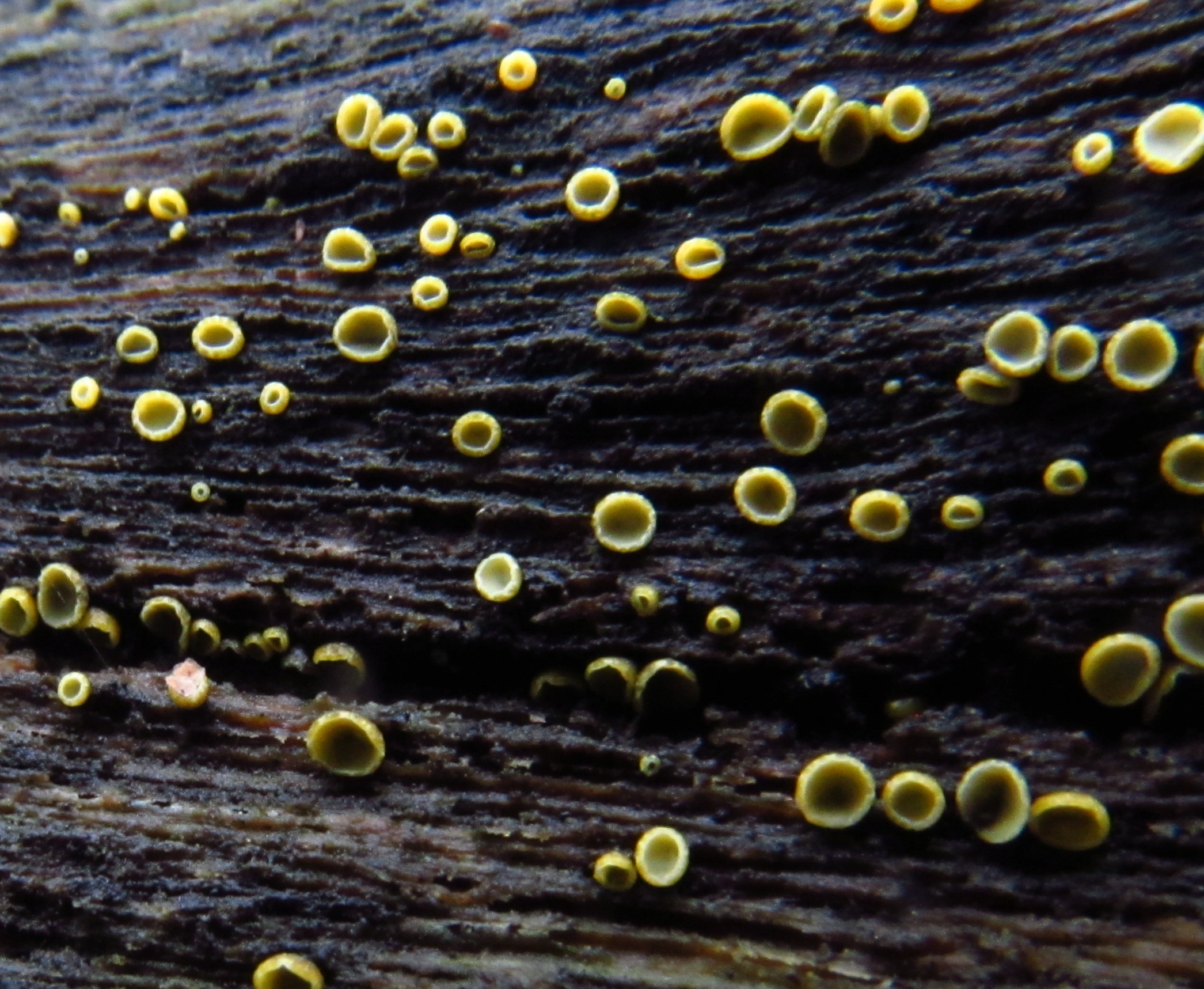

Scientific classification
- Kingdom: Fungi
- Division: Ascomycota
- Class: Leotiomycetes
- Order: Helotiales
- Family: Dermateaceae; Fries (1849)

Type genus
- Dermea Fries (1825)

= Dermateaceae =

Family of fungi

The Dermateaceae is a family of cup fungi in the order Helotiales. Most species in this family are plant pathogens but some are saprobes.

== Genera ==
This is a list of genera in the family, based on the 2007 Outline of Ascomycota.

Aivenia — Angelina — Anthopsis — Ascluella — Atropellis — Belonopsis — Blumeriella — Calloria — Calloriella — Cashiella — Cejpia — Chaetonaevia — Chlorosplenium — Coleosperma — Coronellaria — Crustomollisia — Cryptohymenium — Dennisiodiscus — Dermateopsis — Dermea — Dibeloniella — Diplocarpa — Diplocarpon — Diplonaevia — Discocurtisia — Discohainesia — Drepanopeziza — Duebenia — Durandiella — Eupropolella — Felisbertia — Graddonia — Haglundia — Hysteronaevia — Hysteropezizella — Hysterostegiella — Involucroscypha — Laetinaevia — Leptotrochila — Marssonina — Micropeziza — Mollisia — Naevala — Naeviella — Naeviopsis — Neofabraea — Neotapesia — Niptera — Nothophacidium — Obscurodiscus — Obtectodiscus — Patellariopsis — Patinella — Pezicula — Pezolepis — Phaeonaevia — Pirottaea — Pleoscutula — Ploettnera — Podophacidium — Pseudonaevia — Pseudoniptera — Pseudopeziza — Pyrenopeziza — Sarconiptera — Schizothyrioma — Scleropezicula — Scutobelonium — Scutomollisia — Sorokina — Sorokinella — Spilopodia — Spilopodiella — Trochila — Tuberculariella — Waltonia
