= List of pecan diseases =

This article is a list of diseases of pecan trees (Carya illinoinensis).

== Bacterial diseases ==
Bacterial diseases
Crown gall	Agrobacterium tumefaciens
Pecan bacterial leaf scorch	Xylella fastidiosa

== Fungal diseases ==
Fungal diseases
Anthracnose	Glomerella cingulata Colletotrichum gloeosporioides [anamorph]
Brown leaf spot	Sirosporium diffusum = Cercospora fusca
Clitocybe root rot	Armillaria tabescens = Clitocybe tabescens = Clitocybe parasitica
Cotton root rot	Phymatotrichopsis omnivora = Phymatotrichum omnivorum
Downy spot	Mycosphaerella caryigena Pseudocercosporella caryigena [anamorph]
Eutypa dieback	Eutypella scorparia = Eutypa heteracantha
Gnomonia leaf spot	Gnomonia dispora
Heart rot	Schizophyllum commune
Leaf blotch	Mycosphaerella dendroides = Cercospora halstedii [anamorph]
Liver spot	Gnomonia caryae Asteroma caryae [anamorph]
Nursery blight	Elsinoë randii Sphaceloma randii [anamorph]
Pecan scab	Fusicladium effusum
Physalospora canker	Physalospora abdita = Physalospora fusca Botryosphaeria rhodina = Physalospora rhodina
Phytophthora shuck and kernel rot	Phytophthora cactorum
Pink mold	Trichothecium roseum = Cephalothecium roseum
Powdery mildew	Microsphaera penicillata
Scab	Cladosporium caryigenum
Septoria leaf spot	Septoria caryae
Thread blight	Ceratobasidium sp.
Twig die back	Botryosphaeria dothidea Fusicoccum aesculi [anamorph]
Vein spot	Gnomonia nerviseda Leptothyrium nervisedum [anamorph]
Violet root rot	Helicobasidium brebissonii Rhizoctonia crocorum [anamorph]
Zonate leaf spot	Grovesinia pyramidalis Cristulariella moricola [anamorph]

== Nematodes, parasitic ==
Nematodes, parasitic
Ring nematode	Mesocriconema xenoplax
Root knot nematode	Meloidogyne arenaria Meloidogyne incognita Meloidogyne javanica Meloidogyne partityla

== Phytoplasmal diseases ==
Phytoplasmal diseases
Bunch disease	Phytoplasma in subgroup III

== Virus diseases ==
Pecan mosaic-associated virus, potyvirus

== Miscellaneous diseases and disorders ==
Miscellaneous diseases and disorders
Algal leaf spot and twig infection	Cephaleuros virescens
Little leaf	Unknown
Mouse ear	Nickel deficiency
Rosette	Zinc deficiency
Shuck decline	Unknown
Stem end blight	Unknown
