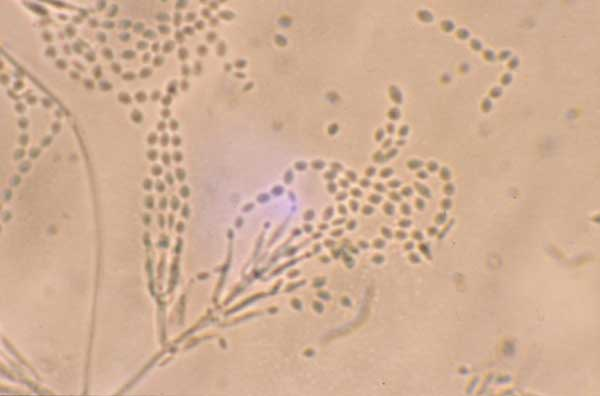
- Divergent phialides and long, tangled chains of elliptical conidia borne from more complex fruiting structures characteristic of Purpureocillium lilacinum; magnification 460X.

Scientific classification
- Domain: Eukaryota
- Kingdom: Fungi
- Division: Ascomycota
- Class: Sordariomycetes
- Order: Hypocreales
- Family: Ophiocordycipitaceae
- Genus: Purpureocillium; Luangsa-ard, Hywel-Jones, Houbraken & Samson (2011)

Type species
- Purpureocillium lilacinum (Thom) Luangsa-ard, Hou- braken, Hywel-Jones & Samson (2011)

Synonyms
- Paecillium Luangsa-ard, Hywel-Jones & Samson nom. prov. (2007)

= Purpureocillium =

Genus of fungi

Purpureocillium is a fungal genus in the Ophiocordycipitaceae family. The genus now contains at least 5 species with the type species Purpureocillium lilacinum, a common soil mold. It has been isolated from a wide range of habitats, including cultivated and uncultivated soils, forests, grassland, deserts, estuarine sediments and sewage sludge, and insects. It has also been found in nematode eggs, and occasionally from females of root-knot and cyst nematodes. In addition, it has frequently been detected in the rhizosphere of many crops. The species can grow at a wide range of temperatures – from 8 to 38 °C (46 to 100 °F) for a few isolates, with optimal growth in the range 26 to 30 °C (79 to 86 °F). It also has a wide pH tolerance and can grow on a variety of substrates. P. lilacinum has shown promising results for use as a biocontrol agent to control the growth of destructive root-knot nematodes.

== Species and phylogeny ==
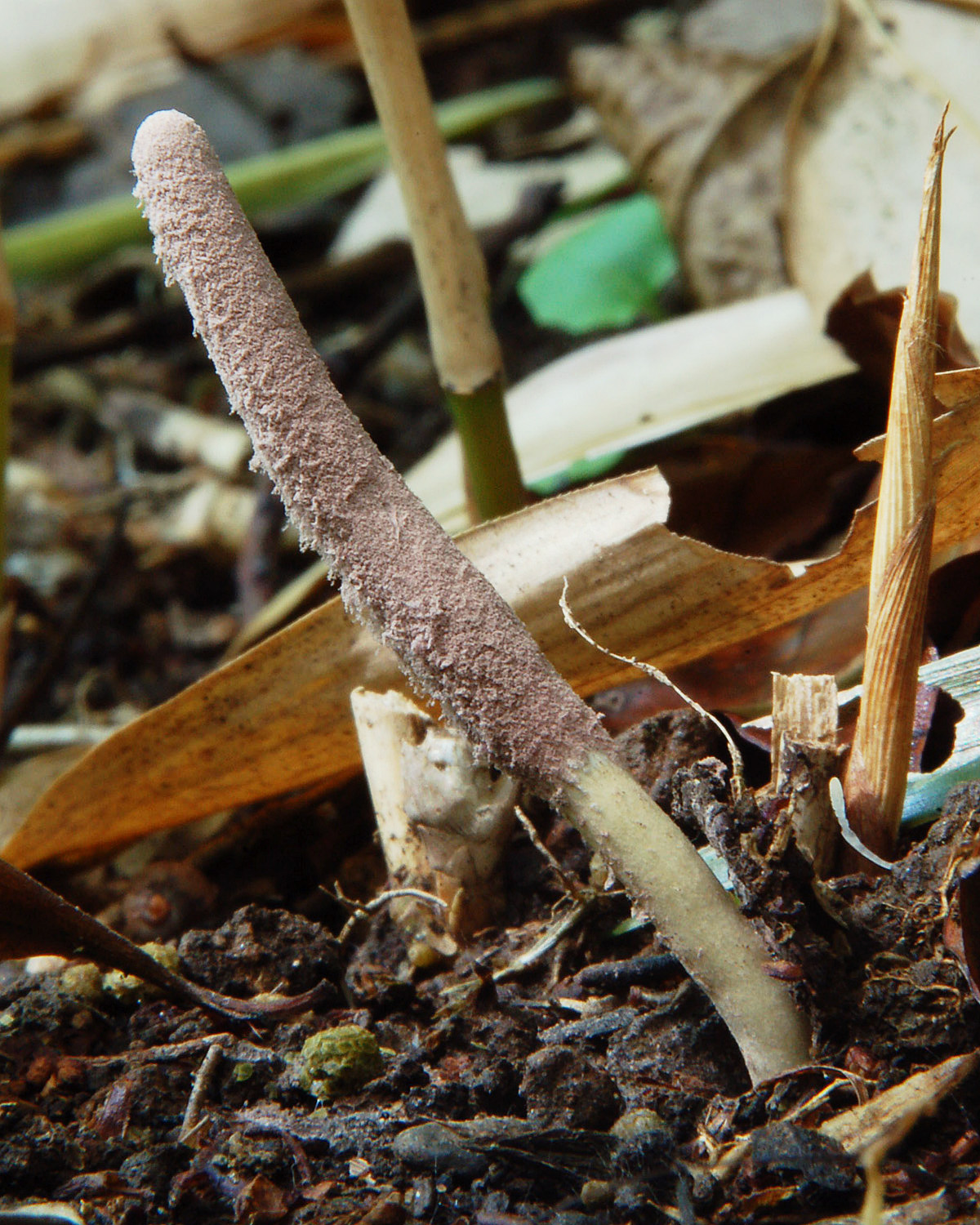
P. atypicola (previously placed in Nomuraea)

Species fungorum and GBIF currently list:

- Purpureocillium atypicola (Yasuda) Spatafora, Hywel-Jones & Luangsa-ard, 2015
- Purpureocillium lavendulum Perdomo, Dania García, Gené, Cano & Guarro, 2013
- Purpureocillium lilacinum (Thom) Luangsa-ard, Houbraken, Hywel-Jones & Samson, 2011
- Purpureocillium roseum Calvillo & Raymundo, 2020
- Purpureocillium sodanum Papizadeh, Soudi, Wijayaw., Shahz.Faz. & K.D.Hyde, 2016
- Purpureocillium takamizusanense (Kobayasi) S.Ban, Azuma & Hirok.Sato, 2015
- a number of unclassified isolates.

P. lilacinum was previously considered to be monotypic and was classified with the Fungi Imperfecti or Deuteromycetes, fungi for which perfect (i.e., sexually reproducing) states have rarely been found. "Paecilomyces lilacinus" was classified in the section Isarioidea, for which perfect states had not been found. Many isolates of P. lilacinum have been identified from around the world and it is accepted that variation exists within the species. Phylogenetic analysis of P. lilacinum isolates show that it is not related to Trichoderma or Gliocladium and is more related to the entomopathogenic Ophiocordyceps
