= Coffee root-knot nematode =

Parasite of coffee plants

There are many plant-parasitic species in the root-knot nematode genus (Meloidogyne) that attack coffee such as M. incognita, M. arenaria, M. exigua, M. javanica and M. coffeicola. Study has already shown interspecific variability coffee, in which show how this species can be adapting to new hosts and environments.

== Morphology and anatomy ==
Meloidogyne exigua females are small with medium stylet (12–14 μm) and strong basal knobs. This genus has sexual dimorphism; females are swollen and males keep vermiform as adults. The female has a pear shape when swollen. It is not possible differentiate one species from other on coffee in the field due to coffee being a host of several species of Meloidogyne. M. exigua can be found in Brazil, Guatemala, Colombia and Costa Rica. M. coffeicola has a long neck and brownish body color. Its stylet is 15–17.6 μm long with no prominent knobs. Females also swell, less than M. exigua, however. This species is found in Brazil, exclusively. Another way to distinguish Meloidogyne species is by the perineal patterns. The perineal pattern involves anus, vagina and surrounding area. Each species has a unique pattern that can distinguish them, but only a trained nematologist is able to verify those small differences. Meloidogyne exigua's perineal pattern has a hexagonal shape, with a dorsal arch above the anus and lateral lines not very pronounced on the perineal pattern, while M. coffeicola pattern have a more simple conformation with striations between vulva and anus forming a target. Due to difficulties to identify Meloidogyne species just by perineal pattern, other reliable techniques were developed, such as Isoenzyme characterizations. Oliveira reported difficulties to use perineal pattern and isoenzymes helped to confirm species without mistakes. M. exigua is distinguished by its esterase phenotypes E1 and E2, while M. coffeicola by Est C2.

== Life cycle ==
Attracted by exudates released by the coffee roots, J2 nematode (migratory stage) moves toward to food source. The nematodes penetrate in the roots and search for a site to feed on. Several cells are selected to start uptaking food. Those cells are modified and grow bigger (hypertrophy) without cellular division. However, nuclei division start happening and many nuclei are produced inside generating giant cells. Surrounding cells will suffer hyperplasia and start cellular division wildly. For M. exigua, these cells will become galls, but not for M. coffeicola. The nematode starts to swell and get a swollen shape as it molts through the juvenile stages until the adult stage. Many eggs will be produced by the female nematode, and released in a gelatinous mass. M. exigua lays its eggs under the epidermis, unlike M.coffeicola that lays them outside of the roots. The juveniles that came out in the gelatinous mass will hatch and find a new feeding site and restart the cycle. Some juveniles may become males when the nematode population is high (competition), environmental condition are not favorable, or the plant is resistant. The life cycle of Meloidogyne exigua was reported to be around 35 days at 25–30 °C.

== Pathology ==
M. exigua causes galls on the root system, which are visible with the naked eye. Although, M. coffeicola does not produce galls it causes peeling and cracking of roots instead. Reduction of root system is observed, mostly because nematodes feed closer to xylem and phloem, where water and nutrients are transported into the plant. This blockage reduces root system development. Above ground symptoms include defoliation and leaf chlorosis leading to death of the plant.

== Management ==
The first thing recommendation to control the gall nematodes is to plant healthy seeds in area not infested. Nematode-free seeds are important to avoid disseminating the pathogen to other areas. However, if areas are already contaminated, other measures will be needed. Some nematicides are still applied to stop J2 from infecting coffee plants. However, due phytotoxicity and high value their use became unpractical. Thus, new cultural methods started to be applied such as irrigation control, remove diseased plants, spacing rows and others not as common. M. exigua can survive for six months without the host, while M. coffeicola just survive for few days or weeks. Thus, not planting host plants for a period greater than six months can eradicate both plant feeders. Grafting is another method applied to control Meloidogyne species that attacks coffee. Resistant varieties are used as a support (stock) such Apoatã, Nemaya, or other C. canephora varieties or hybrids. which will provide nutrients to the other variety on the top (scion) such Mundo Novo, that will be the one with flower and coffee fruit production. It is an easier method, that does not harm the environment. Other cultivar that is used to control M. exigua is IAPAR 59. It carries Mex-1 resistance gene, that causes hypersensitive response (HR) in the plant, also having low reproductive factor to M. exigua. This is a competitive variety with good agronomic factors.
