= Meloidogyne enterolobii =

Scientific classification
- Kingdom: Animalia
- Phylum: Nematoda
- Class: Chromadorea
- Order: Rhabditida
- Family: Meloidogynidae
- Genus: Meloidogyne
- Species: M. enterolobii

Binomial name
- Meloidogyne enterolobii Yang & Eisenback, 1983

Synonyms
- Meloidogyne mayaguensis Rammah & Hirschmann, 1988

Species of tree

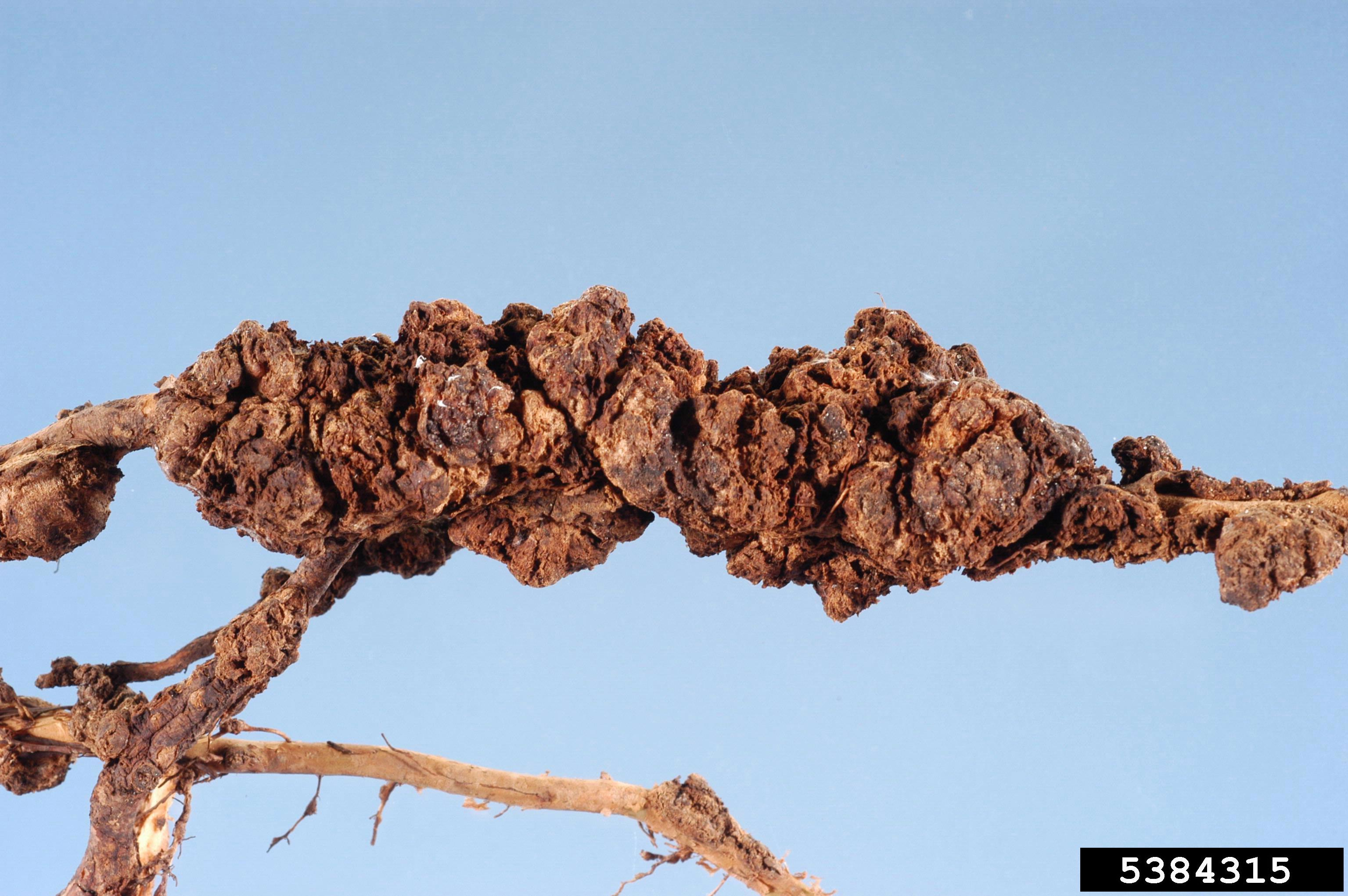
Meloidogyne enterolobii

Meloidogyne enterolobii was originally described from a population collected from the pacara earpod tree (Enterolobium contortisiliquum (Vell.) Morong) in China in 1983. In 2001 it was reported for the first time in the continental USA in Florida. M. enterolobii is now considered one of the most important root-knot nematode species because of its ability of reproducing on root-knot nematode-resistant (Mi-1 gene carrying genotypes) bell pepper and other economically important crops.

== Morphology ==
M. enterolobii, a sedentary endoparasite, has very similar morphology as other species of Meloidogyne. The perineal patterns, male stylet length values (smaller for M. enterolobii than M. incognita) and J2 tail length values (greater for M. enterolobii than M. incognita) of M. enterolobii isolates from Florida are useful morphological characters for the separation of M. enterolobii from M. incognita. Other methods such as enzyme analyses and DNA analysis also have been performed to identify M. enterolobii from other Meloidogyne species.

== Reproduction ==
M. enterolobii is an apomictic species of root-knot nematodes.

== Distribution ==
M. enterolobii is a tropical or subtropical species reported in Australia, Brazil, Venezuela, China, Cuba, France, Guatemala, Puerto Rico, Martinique, Malawi, Senegal, South Africa, Switzerland, Trinidad and Tobago, United States, and West Africa (Ivory Coast and Burkina Faso).

== Host ==
It has a variety of hosts, such as eggplant (Solanum melongena), bell pepper (Capsicum annuum), soybean (Glycine max), sweet potato (Ipomoea batatas), tobacco (Nicotiana tabacum), tomato (Lycopersicon esculentum), watermelon (Citrullus lanatus).

== Management ==
The most efficient control method is preplant soil fumigation with methyl bromide (Mbr). That can reduce the M. incognita reproduction by almost 100%. However, the soil fumigant methyl bromide has been phased out in 2005 because of its negative effects on the ozone layer. A 1995 economic study declared that banning methyl bromide without an alternative method of controlling nematodes would cost the nation's bell pepper industry $127 million in losses.

Some Mbr alternatives have been tested, such as Metham sodium plus chloropicrin (Mna+Pic) and 1,3-Dichloropropene (1,3-D) plus Pic. Mna+Pic provided equal or better Meloidogyne control than methyl bromide plus pic, for sting nematode, they are equal to MBR plus pic. Other alternative such as Multiguard, which is a formulation of furfural, a compound derived from sugarcane waste, which has been reported to have both nematicidal and antifungal properties.

Nematode-resistant bell pepper cultivar is another method to control nematode population. Two bell pepper cultivars, Carolina Wonder and Charleston Belle, have been widely planted in the United States. However, while these varieties offer resistance to M. incognita, they are susceptible to M. enterolobii.

Crop rotation and the addition of soil amendments have demonstrated some positive results in reducing M. enterolobii populations. The root-knot resistant bell peppers are not suggested to be planted in the field all over the seasons because that will select more M. enterolobii, which will survive and become a big population. Meanwhile, less severe yield loss of susceptible bell peppers has been observed when growing them after resistant bell peppers.
