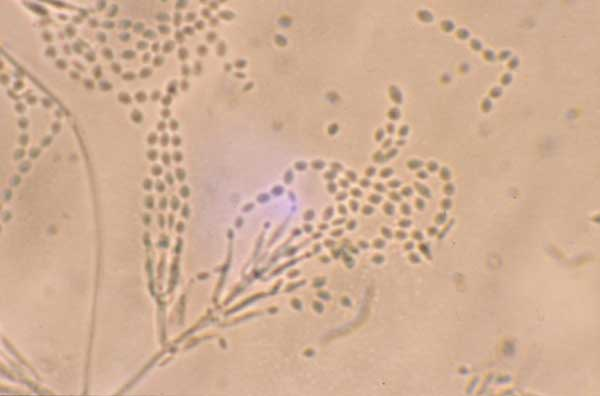
- Divergent phialides and long, tangled chains of elliptical conidia borne from more complex fruiting structures characteristic of Purpureocillium lilacinum; magnification 460X.

Scientific classification
- Kingdom: Fungi
- Division: Ascomycota
- Class: Sordariomycetes
- Order: Hypocreales
- Family: Ophiocordycipitaceae
- Genus: Purpureocillium
- Species: P. lilacinum

Binomial name
- Purpureocillium lilacinum (Thom) Luangsa-ard, Hou- braken, Hywel-Jones & Samson (2011)

Synonyms
- Paecillium Luangsa-ard, Hywel-Jones & Samson nom. prov. (2007); Penicillium lilacinum Thom (1910); Penicillium amethystinum Wehmer (1923); Spicaria rubidopurpurea Aoki (1941) Paecilomyces lilacinus (Thom) Samson (1974)

= Purpureocillium lilacinum =

Species of fungus

Purpureocillium lilacinum is a species of filamentous fungus in the family Ophiocordycipitaceae. It has been isolated from a wide range of habitats, including cultivated and uncultivated soils, forests, grassland, deserts, estuarine sediments and sewage sludge, and insects. It has also been found in nematode eggs, and occasionally from females of root-knot and cyst nematodes. In addition, it has frequently been detected in the rhizosphere of many crops. The species can grow at a wide range of temperatures – from 8 to 38 °C (46 to 100 °F) for a few isolates, with optimal growth in the range 26 to 30 °C (79 to 86 °F). It also has a wide pH tolerance and can grow on a variety of substrates. P. lilacinum has shown promising results for use as a biocontrol agent to control the growth of destructive root-knot nematodes.

== Taxonomy and phylogeny ==
The species was originally described by American mycologist Charles Thom in 1910, under than name Penicillium lilacinum. Taxonomic synonyms include Penicillium amethystinum Wehmer and Spicaria rubidopurpurea Aoki. In 1974, Robert A. Samson transferred the species to Paecilomyces. Publications in the 2000s (decade) indicated that the genus Paecilomyces was not monophyletic, and that close relatives were Paecilomyces nostocoides, Isaria takamizusanensis and Nomuraea atypicola. The new genus Purpureocillium was created to hold the taxon. The generic name refers to the purple conidia produced by the fungus.

== Description ==
Purpureocillium lilacinum forms a dense mycelium which gives rise to conidiophores. These bear phialides from the ends of which spores are formed in long chains. Spores germinate when suitable moisture and nutrients are available. Colonies on malt agar grow rather fast, attaining a diameter of 5–7 cm within 14 days at 25 °C (77 °F), consisting of a basal felt with a floccose overgrowth of aerial mycelium; at first white, but when sporulating changing to various shades of vinaceous. The reverse side is sometimes uncolored but usually in vinaceous shades. The vegetative hyphae are smooth-walled, hyaline, and 2.5–4.0 μm wide. Conidiophores arising from submerged hyphae, 400–600 μm in length, or arising from aerial hyphae and half as long. Phialides consisting of a swollen basal part, tapering into a thin distinct neck. Conidia are in divergent chains, ellipsoid to fusiform in shape, and smooth walled to slightly roughened. Chlamydospores are absent.

== Life cycles ==
Purpureocillium lilacinum is highly adaptable in its life strategy: depending on the availability of nutrients in the surrounding microenvironments it may be entomopathogenic, mycoparasitic, saprophytic, as well as nematophagous.

== Human pathogenicity ==
Purpureocillium lilacinum is an infrequent cause of human disease. Most reported cases involve patients with compromised immune systems, indwelling foreign devices, or intraocular lens implants. Research of the last decade suggests it may be an emerging pathogen of both immunocompromised as well as immunocompetent adults. It is one of the most common species causing hyalohyphomycosis along with Paecilomyces variotii. The species has also been reported to cause pulmonary infections in immunocompromised individuals.

== Biocontrol agent ==
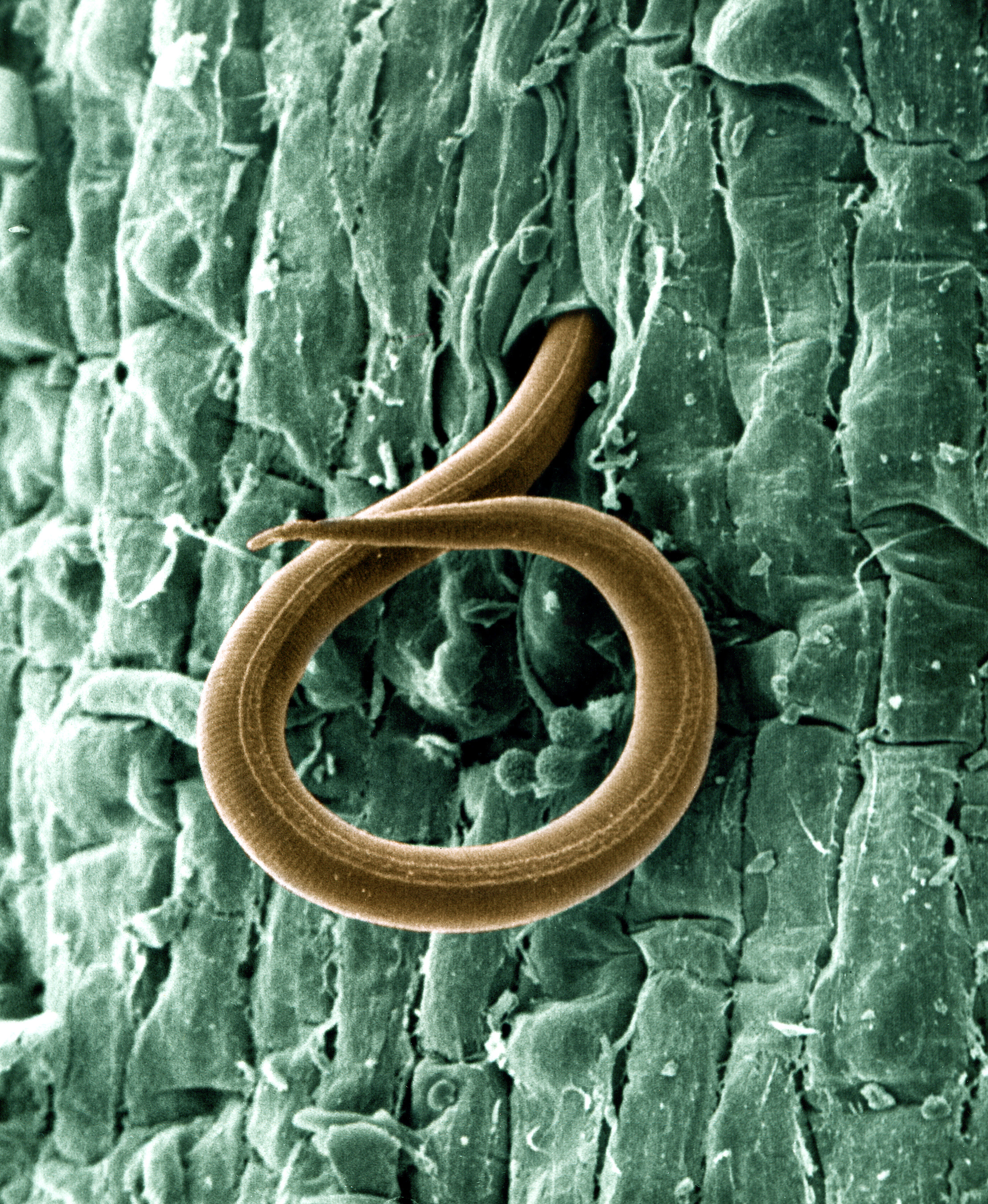
P. lilacinum is used as a biocontrol agent for several nematode species, such as Meloidogyne incognita, shown here.

Plant-parasitic nematodes cause significant economic losses to a wide variety of crops. Chemical control is a widely used option for plant-parasitic nematode management. However, chemical nematicides are now being reappraised in respect of environmental hazard, high costs, limited availability in many developing countries or their diminished effectiveness following repeated applications.

=== Control of plant-parasitic nematodes ===
Purpureocillium lilacinum was first observed in association with nematode eggs in 1966 and the fungus was subsequently found parasitising the eggs of Meloidogyne incognita in Peru. It has now been isolated from many cyst and root-knot nematodes and from soil in many locations. Several successful field trials using P. lilacinum against pest nematodes were conducted in Peru. The Peruvian isolate was then sent to nematologists in 46 countries for testing, as part of the International Meloidogyne project, resulting in many more field trials on a range of crops in many soil types and climates. Field trials, glasshouse trials and in vitro testing of P. lilacinum continues and more isolates have been collected from soil, nematodes and occasionally from insects. Isolates vary in their pathogenicity to plant-parasitic nematodes. Some isolates are aggressive parasites while others, though morphologically indistinguishable, are less or non-pathogenic. Sometimes isolates that looked promising in vitro or in glasshouse trials have failed to provide control in the field.

=== Enzymes ===
Many enzymes produced by P. lilacinum have been studied. A basic serine protease with biological activity against Meloidogyne hapla eggs has been identified. One strain of P. lilacinum has been shown to produce proteases and a chitinase, enzymes that could weaken a nematode egg shell so as to enable a narrow infection peg to push through.

=== Egg infection ===
Before infecting a nematode egg, P. lilacinum flattens against the egg surface and becomes closely appressed to it. P. lilacinum produces simple appressoria anywhere on the nematode egg shell either after a few hyphae grow along the egg surface, or after a network of hyphae form on the egg. The presence of appressoria appears to indicate that the egg is, or is about to be, infected. In either case, the appressorium appears the same, as a simple swelling at the end of a hypha, closely appressed to the eggshell. Adhesion between the appressorium and nematode egg surface must be strong enough to withstand the opposing force produced by the extending tip of a penetration hypha. When the hypha has penetrated the egg, it rapidly destroys the juvenile within, before growing out of the now empty egg shell to produce conidiophores and to grow towards adjacent eggs.

== Mycotoxins ==
Paecilotoxin is a mycotoxin isolated from the fungus. Its significance is unknown. Khan et al. (2003) tested one strain of P. lilacinum for the production of paecilotoxin and were unable to show toxin production in that strain, suggesting that toxin synthesis may vary among isolates.
