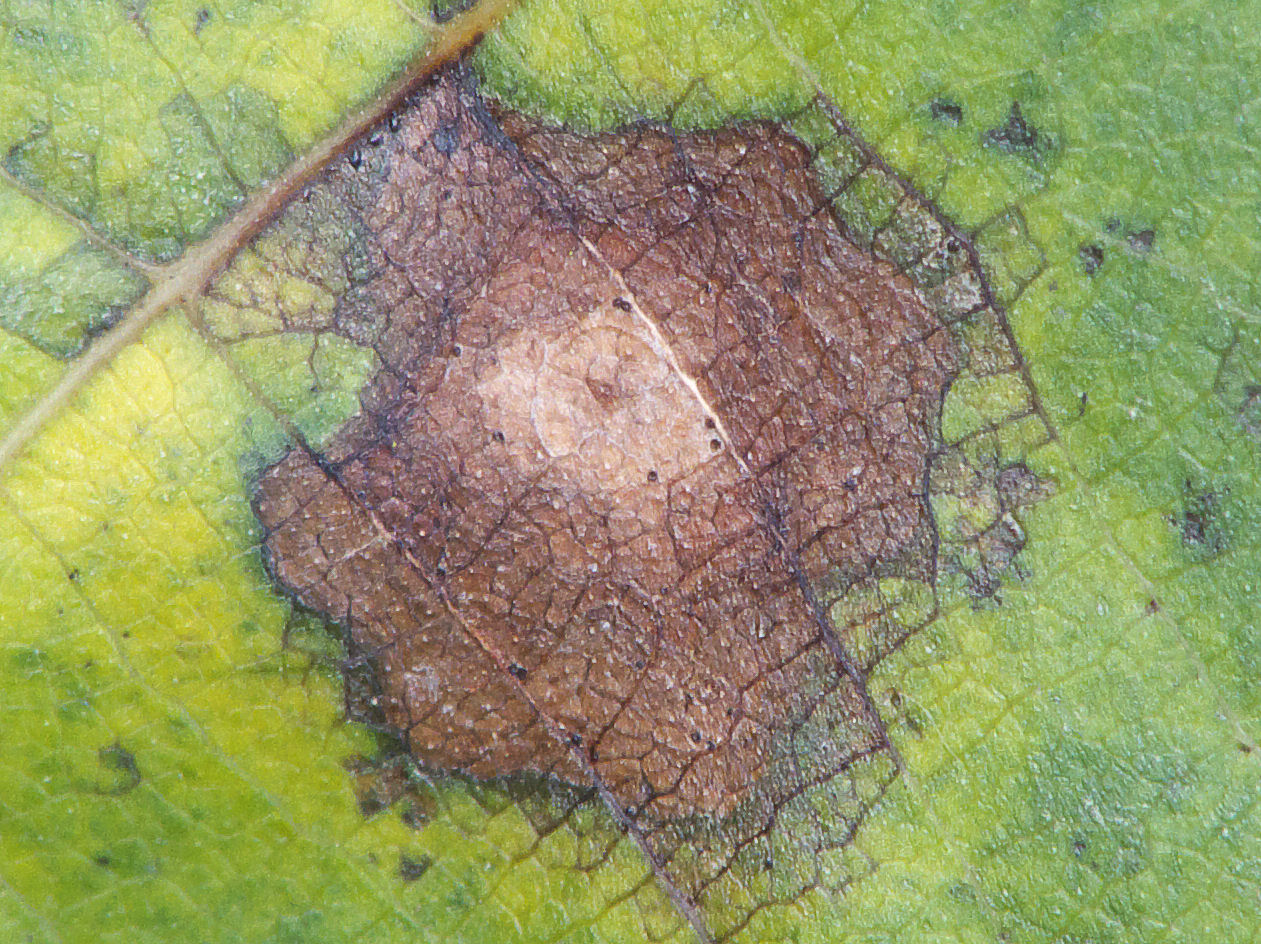
- Topside view of a Juglans regia leaf infected by G. leptostyla
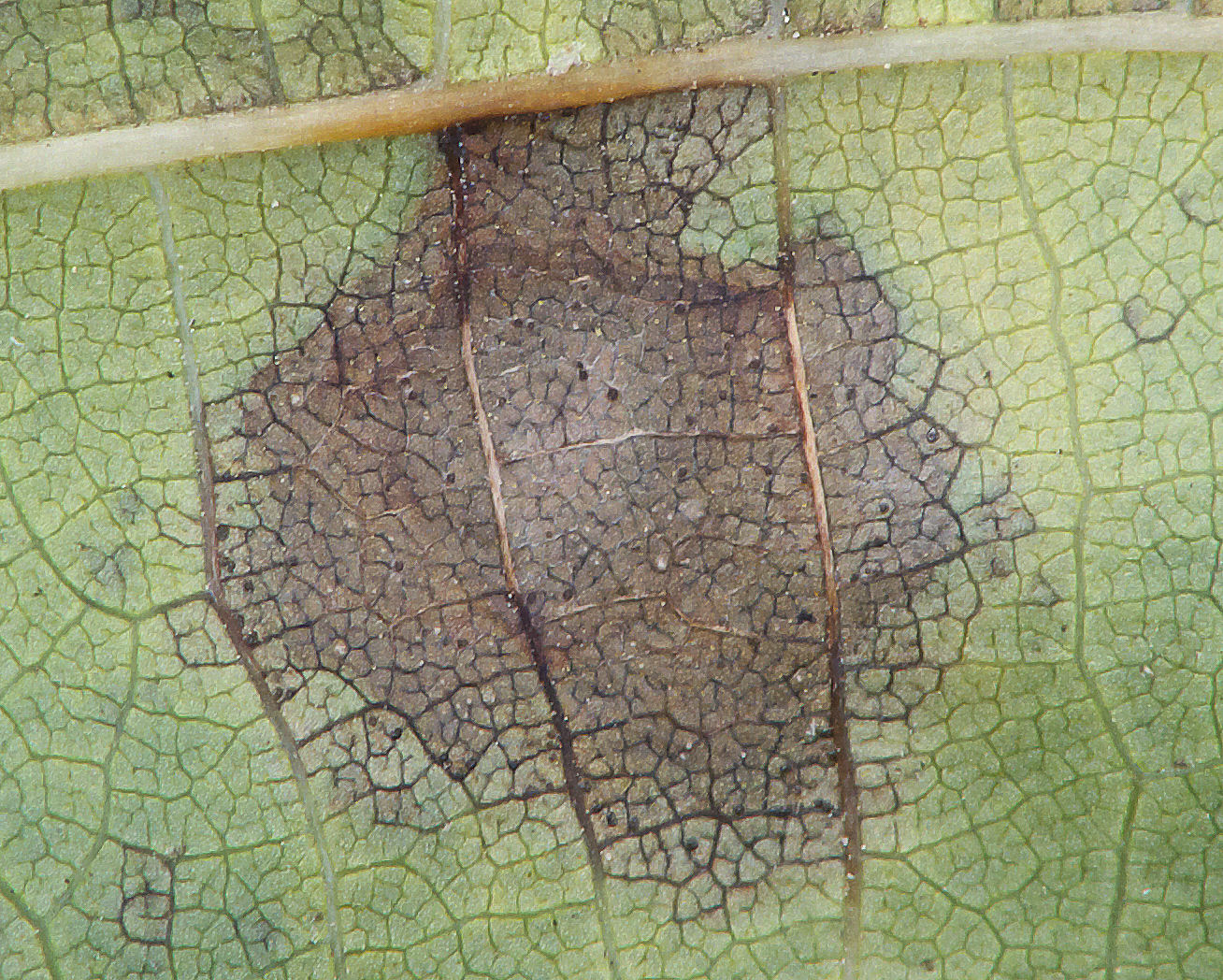
- Underside view of a Juglans regia leaf infected by G. leptostyla

Scientific classification
- Kingdom: Fungi
- Division: Ascomycota
- Class: Sordariomycetes
- Order: Diaporthales
- Family: Gnomoniaceae
- Genus: Gnomonia
- Species: G. leptostyla

Binomial name
- Gnomonia leptostyla (Fr.) Ces. & De Not., (1863)

Synonyms
- Gloeosporium juglandis (Lib.) Mont., (1849); Gnomonia juglandis (DC.) Traverso; Leptothyrium juglandis Lib.,: no. 164 (1832); Marssonia juglandis (Lib.) Sacc., (1884); Marssoniella juglandis (Lib.) Höhn., (1916); Marssonina juglandis (Lib.) Magnus, (1906); Neomarssoniella juglandis (Lib.) U. Braun, (1991); Sphaeria juglandis DC., (1815); Sphaeria leptostyla Fr., (1823)

= Gnomonia leptostyla =

Species of fungus

Gnomonia leptostyla is a fungal plant pathogen. It is newly named Ophiognomonia leptostyla and occurs on walnut (Juglans spp.) and causes leaf blotch and leaf spots which is called walnut anthracnose or walnut black spot. The anamorph is Marssoniella juglandis.
