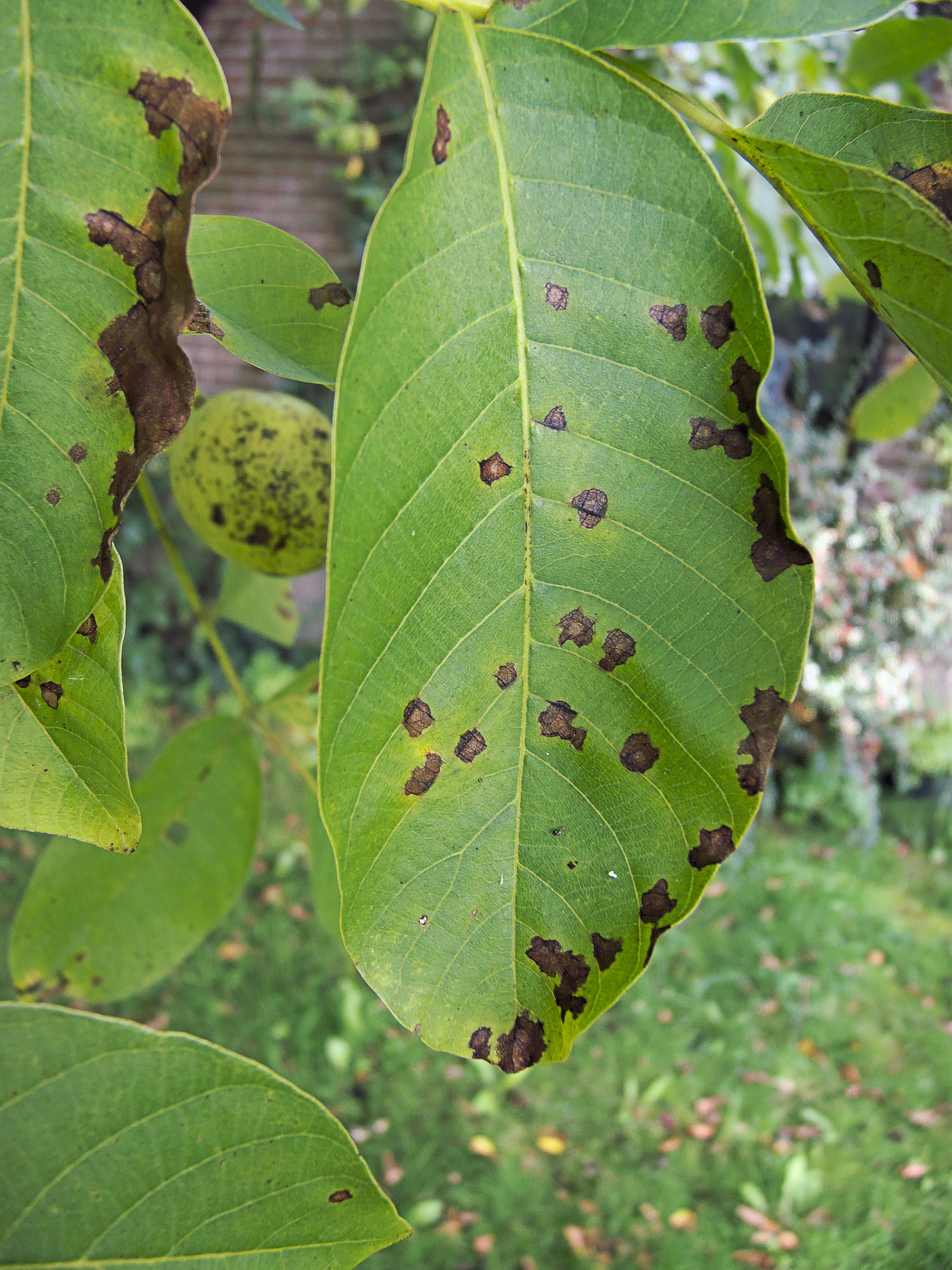
- Gnomonia leptostyla on Juglans regia Buccaneer

Scientific classification
- Kingdom: Fungi
- Division: Ascomycota
- Class: Sordariomycetes
- Order: Diaporthales
- Family: Gnomoniaceae
- Genus: Gnomonia; Ces. & De Not.

Type species
- Gnomonia vulgaris Ces. & De Not.

= Gnomonia =

Genus of fungi

Gnomonia is a genus of fungi in the family Gnomoniaceae.

The genus contains as estimated 60 species including:

- Gnomonia alnea
- Gnomonia borealis
- Gnomonia caryae
- Gnomonia comari
- Gnomonia dispora
- Gnomonia fructicola
- Gnomonia iliau
- Gnomonia leptostyla
- Gnomonia nerviseda
- Gnomonia rubi
- Gnomonia tithymalina
- Gnomonia vulgaris
