= Meloidogyne partityla =

Scientific classification
- Domain: Eukaryota
- Kingdom: Animalia
- Phylum: Nematoda
- Class: Secernentea
- Order: Tylenchida
- Family: Heteroderidae
- Genus: Meloidogyne
- Species: M. partityla

Binomial name
- Meloidogyne partityla Kleynhans, 1986

Species of parasitic nematode

Meloidogyne partityla is a plant pathogenic nematode infecting pecan. One of the first described cases of this nematode where noted in pecan trees in South Africa by Brito et al. (2013). It is thought to have been introduced into South Africa by pecan seedlings that came from the United States (Eisenback, 2015). Today, this nematode is seen infecting pecan trees in Arizona, Arkansas, Florida, Georgia, New Mexico, Oklahoma, and Texas (Eisenback, 2015). They not only infect pecans, but they also infect the California black walnut, English walnut, shagbark hickory, and laurel oak (Eisenback, 2015). The first report in the US, was reported in South Carolina in which it infected laurel oaks but later started infecting neighboring pecan trees in the shared orchards (Eisenback, 2015). The health of infested trees continue to decline every year (Eisenback, 2015).

== See also ==
- List of pecan diseases
