= Meloidogyne brevicauda =

Scientific classification
- Kingdom: Animalia
- Phylum: Nematoda
- Class: Secernentea
- Order: Tylenchida
- Family: Heteroderidae
- Genus: Meloidogyne
- Species: M. brevicauda

Binomial name
- Meloidogyne brevicauda Loos, 1953

Species of roundworm

Meloidogyne brevicauda is a plant-parasitic nematode. It is also called tea root-knot nematode, mature tea nematode or Indian root-knot nematode. It is a member of the root-knot nematodes, which was identified by C. A. Loos in 1953 in Sri Lanka.

== Description ==
Female M. brevicauda has a narrow procorpus, a large metacorpus, a large glandular region that has one dorsal and two subventral esophageal gland lobes. Two large nucleated esophago-intestinal cells are at the dorsal base of the metacorpus junction with the intestine. The labial disc and lips are prominent and protrude from the regular body contour. The perineal pattern appears with high squared dorsal and ventral arches without prominent lateral lines.

Male M. brevicauda has a slit-like stoma surrounded by six small, pore-like openings of the inner labial sensilla. The head annulations are absent. The lips are set off from the body annulations because the diameter of the lips is larger than that of the first body annule. The first body annule is also narrower than the remaining body annules. The shape of the head of males of M. brevicauda is very different from that of most root-knot males. The labial disc of most males of Meloidogyne is fused with the medial lips, but in M. brevicauda, the labial disc is distantly separated from them by a deep groove. Other than that, most root-knot males have a large head annule that may be further divided by irregular or incomplete annulations. Males of M.brevicauda do not have a head region, the lips are immediately adjacent to the first body annule. The tail is marked by acrescent-shaped fold in the cuticle surrounding the posterior portion of the cloacal opening.

== Life cycle ==
This root-knot nematode is sedentary endoparasitic nematode. Second-stage juveniles (J2) penetrate host roots where they establish a specialized feeding site (giant cells) in the stele. As J2 develop, they cause root swellings and become swollen females. Females rupture root cortex and sometime protrude with the egg masses from the root surface. J2 emerge from the egg masses and migrate in the soil.

== Distribution ==
Azerbaijan; Fujian Province, China; Tamil Naduand West Bengal, India and Sri Lanka

== Hosts ==
Camellia sinensis (tea) and Crocus sativus (saffron)

== Symptoms ==
Above-ground symptoms on tea are pale, dull leaves or abnormal leaf fall. Infestations are more apparent in bushes recovering from pruning. Severely attacked bushes may fail to recover. The infected roots have large, characteristic galls, many of which have pinhole pits.

== Management ==
- Use nematode-free planting material.
- Apply nematicides in the planting hole in areas with a history of nematode infestation.
- Avoid susceptible clones.
- Use soil amendments such as refuse tea, compost, castor oil cake and neem oil cake.
- Uproot severely damaged mature tea and replacing it with a nematode trap crop before replanting.

== Impact ==
Although M. brevicauda causes severe damage to tea, there has been no quantification of the damage caused. The risk posed by M. brevicauda is limited due to its limited distribution and host range (tea and saffron).
