= Purpureocillium roseum =

Scientific classification
- Domain: Eukaryota
- Kingdom: Fungi
- Division: Ascomycota
- Class: Sordariomycetes
- Order: Hypocreales
- Family: Ophiocordycipitaceae
- Genus: Purpureocillium
- Species: P. roseum

Binomial name
- Purpureocillium roseum Calvillo & Raymundo (2020)

Species of fungus

Purpureocillium roseum is a species of fungus in the genus Purpureocillium in the order of Hypocreales.
