= Cercospora fusca =

Scientific classification
- Kingdom: Fungi
- Division: Ascomycota
- Class: Dothideomycetes
- Order: Mycosphaerellales
- Family: Mycosphaerellaceae
- Genus: Cercospora
- Species: C. fusca

Binomial name
- Cercospora fusca F.V. Rand, (1914)

Species of fungus

Cercospora fusca is a fungal plant pathogen. It causes brown leaf spot in pecan trees.
