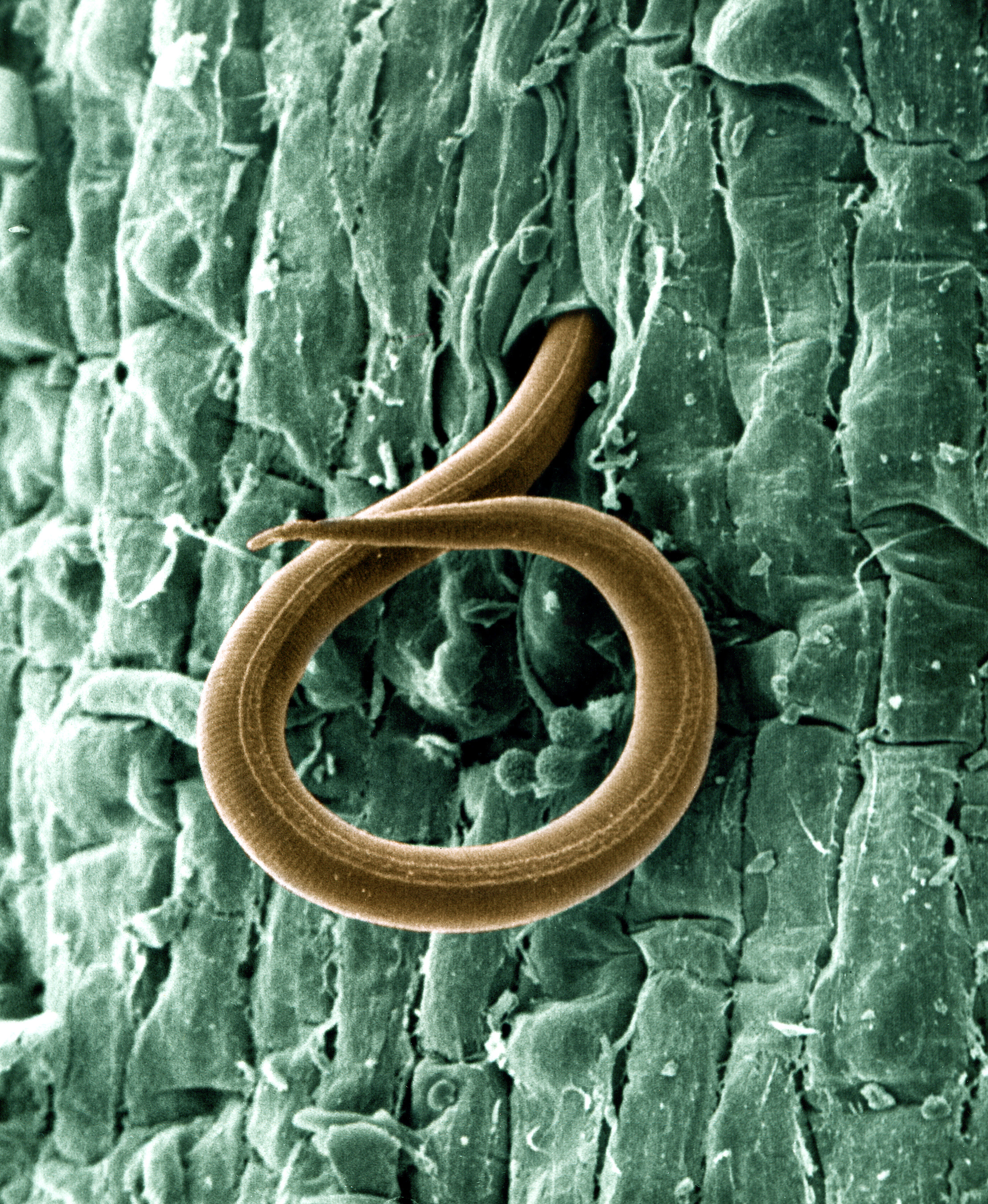

Scientific classification
- Kingdom: Animalia
- Phylum: Nematoda
- Class: Chromadorea
- Order: Rhabditida
- Family: Meloidogynidae
- Genus: Meloidogyne
- Species: M. incognita

Binomial name
- Meloidogyne incognita (Kofoid & White, 1919)

= Meloidogyne incognita =

Nematode worm, plant disease, many hosts

Meloidogyne incognita (root-knot nematode, RKN), also known as the southern root-nematode or cotton root-knot nematode, is a plant-parasitic roundworm in the family Heteroderidae. This nematode is one of the four most common species worldwide and has numerous hosts. It typically incites large, usually irregular galls on roots as a result of parasitism.

M. incognita can move along shallower temperature gradients (0.001 °C/cm) than any other known organism, an example of thermotaxis. The response is complicated and thought to allow the nematodes to move toward an appropriate level in soil, while they search for chemical cues that can guide them to specific roots.

== Distribution ==
Meloidogyne incognita is widely spread around the globe and found in many different soil types.

== Host ==
Meloidogyne incognita is probably the most economically important plant-parasitic nematode species among the tropical and subtropical regions. This nematode is extremely polyphagous, attacking both monocotyledons and dicotyledons. It is estimated that more than 3,000 plant species can be affected. It is a common cause of severe disease in the staple crop cassava (Manihot esculenta). It produces severe galling and thus yield loss.

== Symptoms ==
Plants affected by M. incognita present above ground symptoms of water- and nutrient-stress, yellowing, wilting, and stunting. Below ground galling on roots, bulbs, tubers is the typical symptom. Plant death may occur in high infestation level.

== Morphology ==
Females of M. incognita are pear-shaped with no posterior protuberance. Their stylet ranges from 15 to 16 μm long, and knobs are rounded and offset. Perineal pattern is oval to rounded, typically with high dorsal arch, striae usually wavy, and lateral field absent or weakly demarcated. Males have a not offset head with an elevated labial disc without lateral lips (usually). Their stylet ranges from 23 to 26 μm long, and knobs are rounded to oval and offset. Juveniles' second stage body size ranges from 350 to 450 μm long. Their tail has a rounded tip and ranges from 43 to 65 μm in length with a 6 to 14 μm long hyaline region.

== Life cycle ==
Within the egg, the first molt occurs and a juvenile first state (J1) becomes a juvenile second stage (J2). Under favorable conditions (temperature, moisture, host stimulus) the J2 hatches, reaches and penetrates the host root. Root tips are the primary infection court. Once inside the roots, J2 migrate through cortical tissues towards the vascular zone where they establish a permanent feeding site called giant cell. At this point the nematode enlarges acquire a "sausage" shape and becomes sedentary. Three more molts occur, J2 becomes J3, J4 and then adult. M. incognita is sexually dimorphic. Females acquire a globose shaped body while males become vermiform and leave the roots. Upon maturity females lay eggs into a gelatinous mass that protect them against unfavorable environmental conditions, and the life cycle is repeated. It takes 37 days at 21 °C (70 °F) for M. incognita to complete its life cycle.

== Management ==
Management of M. incognita depends primarily on the crop being affected and relies on multiple strategies such as cultural, biological and chemical control. Among the cultural control crop rotation with nonhost or resistant varieties can be used to keep the nematode population at tolerable levels. Also, usage of organic amendments and antagonistic crops such as Crotalaria spectabilis (Leguminosae) and several Tagetes species (Asteraceae) is effective against this nematode. Some fungi that parasitize eggs, for example Paecilomyces lilacinus, have been using as a biological control. There are several nematicides out in the market for controlling M. incognita.

== See also ==
- Coffee root-knot nematode
- Sodium azide – used for agricultural control of Meloidogyne incognita
