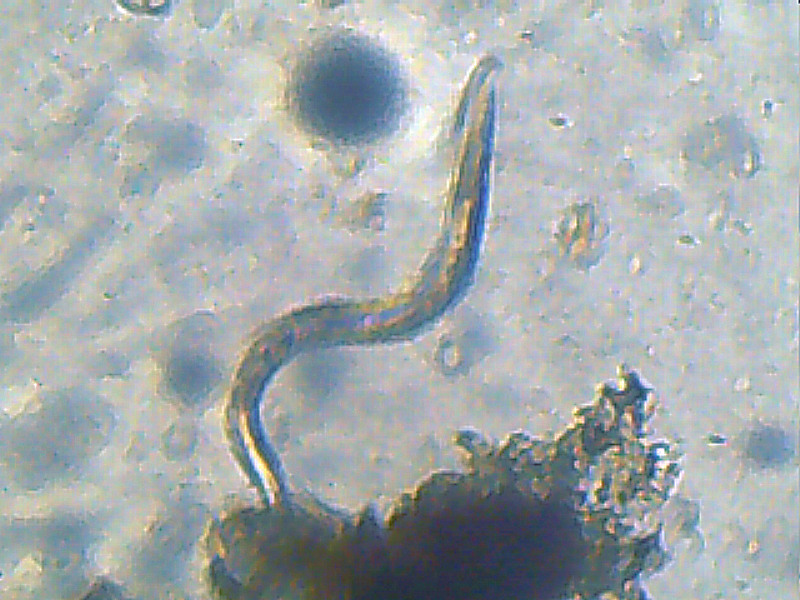

Scientific classification
- Kingdom: Animalia
- Phylum: Nematoda
- Class: Secernentea
- Order: Tylenchida
- Family: Heteroderidae
- Genus: Meloidogyne
- Species: M. chitwoodi

Binomial name
- Meloidogyne chitwoodi Golden, O'Bannon, Santo, & Finley, 1980

= Meloidogyne chitwoodi =

Species of roundworm

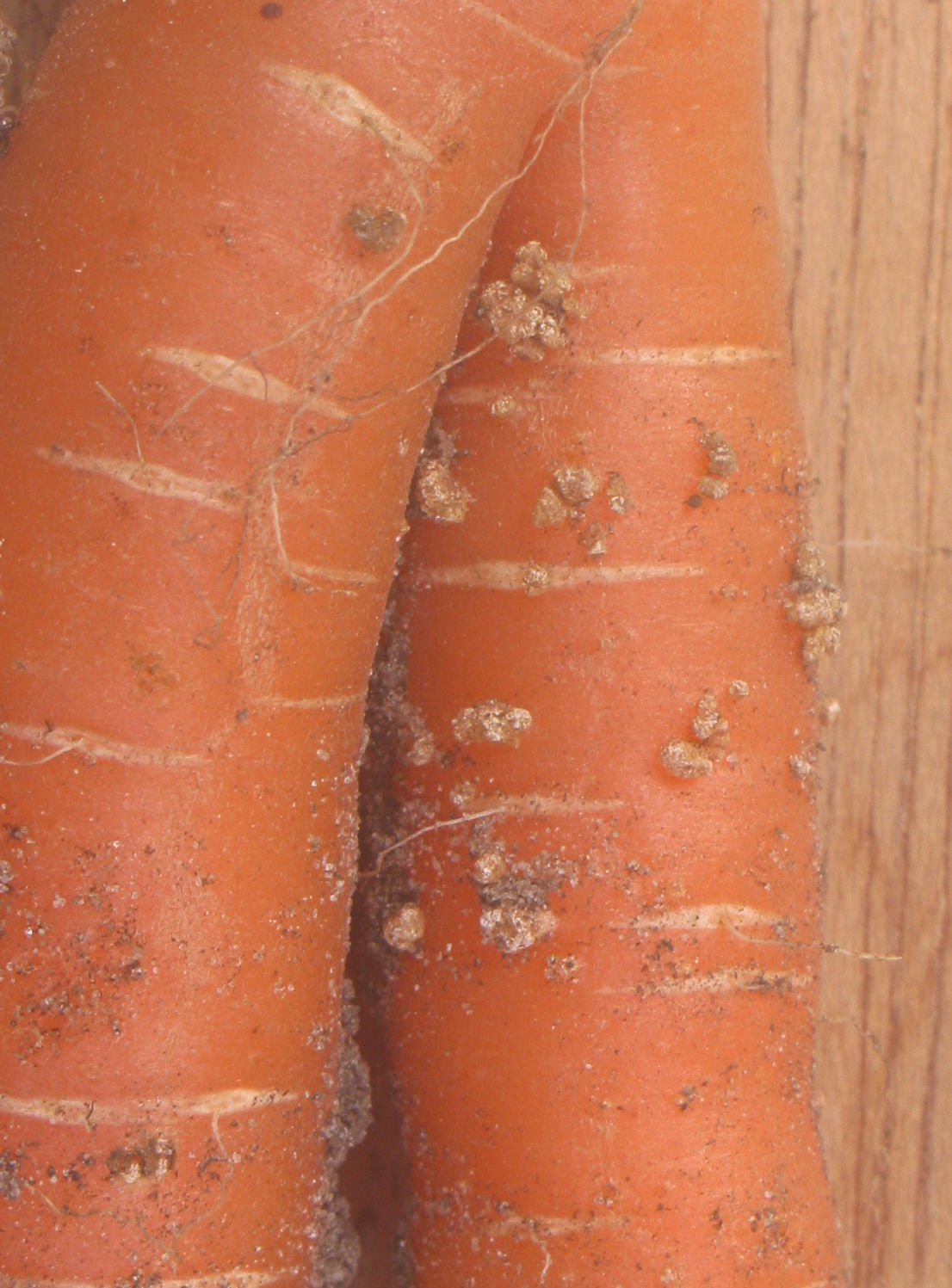
Carrot infected with Meloidogyne chitwoodi

Meloidogyne chitwoodi is a plant pathogenic root-knot nematode that is a crop pest of potatoes, carrots, and black salsify. Root-knot nematodes such as M. chitwoodi cause the production of root-knot galls when their larvae infect the plant's roots and capture nutrients stored in the roots.
