= Purpureocillium lavendulum =

Scientific classification
- Domain: Eukaryota
- Kingdom: Fungi
- Division: Ascomycota
- Class: Sordariomycetes
- Order: Hypocreales
- Family: Ophiocordycipitaceae
- Genus: Purpureocillium
- Species: P. lavendulum

Binomial name
- Purpureocillium lavendulum H. Perdomo, D. García, Gené, Cano & Guarro (2012)

Species of fungus

Purpureocillium lavendulum is a species of fungus in the genus Purpureocillium in the order of Hypocreales.
