= Purpureocillium takamizusanense =

Scientific classification
- Kingdom: Fungi
- Division: Ascomycota
- Class: Sordariomycetes
- Order: Hypocreales
- Family: Ophiocordycipitaceae
- Genus: Purpureocillium
- Species: P. takamizusanense

Binomial name
- Purpureocillium takamizusanense (Kobayasi) S. Ban, Azuma & Hirok. Sato (2015)

Synonyms
- Cordyceps ryogamimontana Kobayasi (1963); Isaria takamizusanensis Kobayasi (1941)

Species of fungus

Purpureocillium takamizusanense is a species of fungus in the genus Purpureocillium in the order of Hypocreales.

== Biology ==
P. takamizusanense is the holomorph designation of this species. The anamorph form Isaria takamizusanensis and it's teleomorph Cordyceps rogamimontana were originally described to the genera Isaria and Cordyceps respectively., before their connection was shown in 2015.

P. takamizusanense has been collected from various cicada species in Japan. Species include Hyalessa maculaticollis, from which the holotype was sampled in 1939, and Meimuna opalifera.
