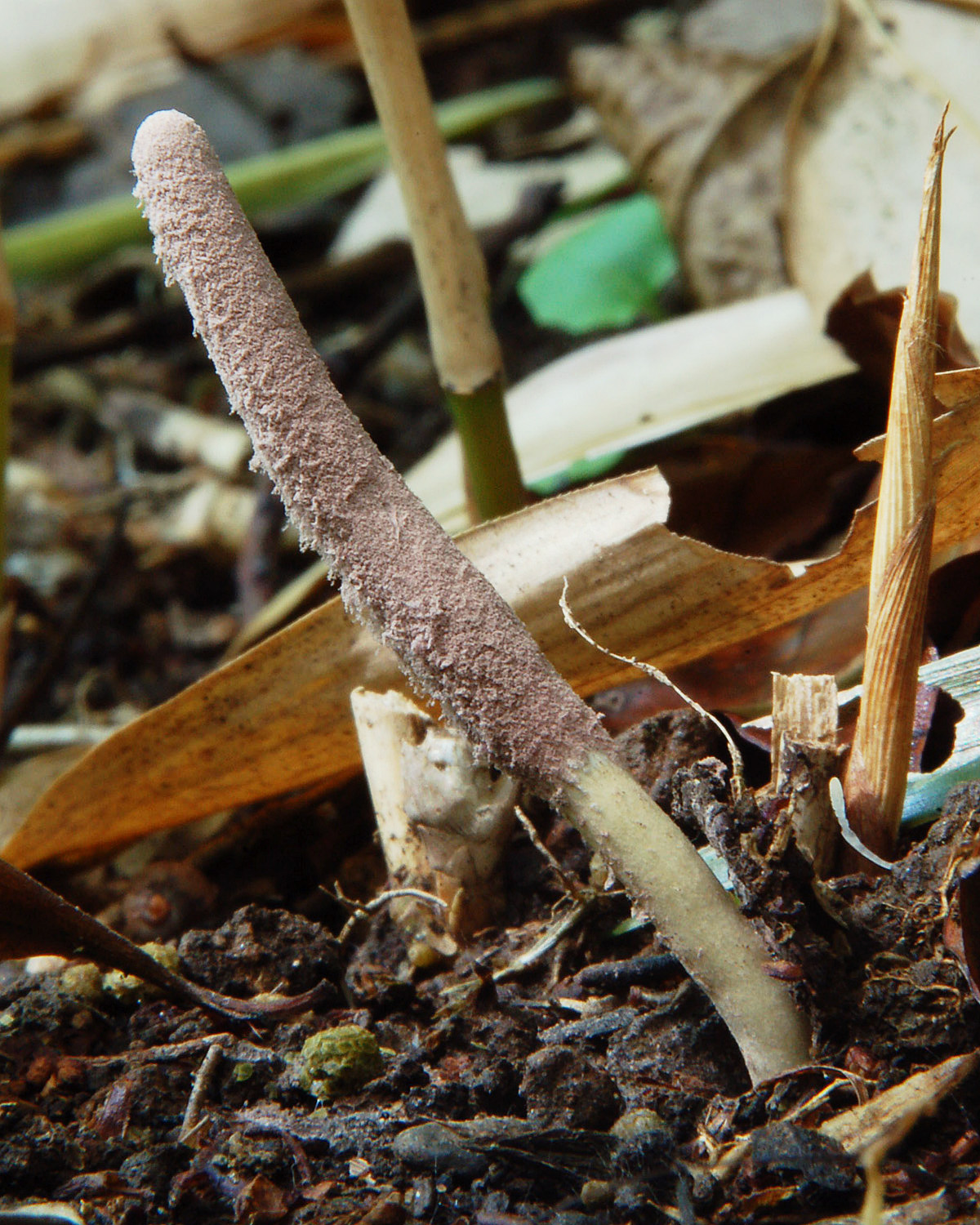

Scientific classification
- Kingdom: Fungi
- Division: Ascomycota
- Class: Sordariomycetes
- Order: Hypocreales
- Family: Ophiocordycipitaceae
- Genus: Purpureocillium
- Species: P. atypicola

Binomial name
- Purpureocillium atypicola (Yasuda) Spatafora, Hywel-Jones & Luangsa-ard, 2015

Synonyms
- Isaria atypicola Yasuda 1915 (basionym); Nomuraea atypicola (Yasuda) Samson 1974; Purpureocillium atypicolum Spicaria atypicola (Yasuda) Petch 1939

= Purpureocillium atypicola =

Species of fungus

Purpureocillium atypicola is a species of entomopathogenic fungus, previously known as Nomuraea atypicola, in the family Ophiocordycipitaceae with no subspecies listed in the Catalogue of Life. There are records of this fungus from Japan, Australia and New Zealand.
