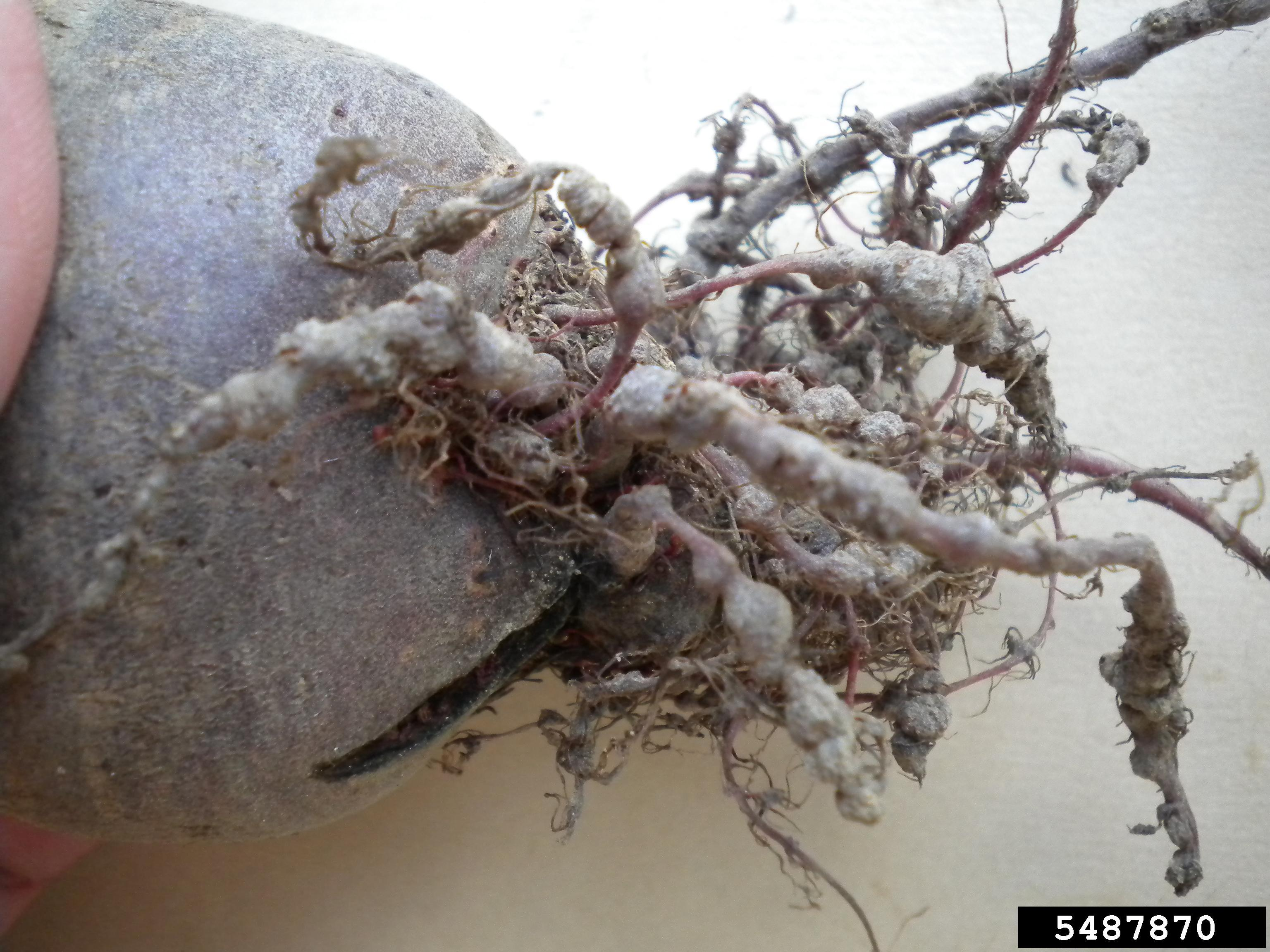
- Meloidogyne arenaria on Beta vulgaris (beetroot)

Scientific classification
- Kingdom: Animalia
- Phylum: Nematoda
- Class: Chromadorea
- Order: Rhabditida
- Family: Meloidogynidae
- Genus: Meloidogyne
- Species: M. arenaria

Binomial name
- Meloidogyne arenaria (Neal, 1889)

= Meloidogyne arenaria =

Species of roundworm

Meloidogyne arenaria is a species of plant pathogenic nematodes. This nematode is also known as the peanut root knot nematode. The word "Meloidogyne" is derived from two Greek words that mean "apple-shaped" and "female". The peanut root knot nematode, M. arenaria is one of the "major" Meloidogyne species because of its worldwide economic importance. M. arenaria is a predominant nematode species in the United States attacking peanut in Alabama, Florida, Georgia, and Texas. The most damaging nematode species for peanut in the USA is M. arenaria race 1 and losses can exceed 50% in severely infested fields. Among the several Meloidogyne species that have been characterized, M. arenaria is the most variable both morphologically and cytologically. In 1949, two races of this nematode had been identified, race 1 which reproduces on peanut and race 2 which cannot do so. However, in a recent study, three races were described (races 1, 2, and 3). López-Pérez et al (2011) had also studied populations of M. arenaria race 2, which reproduces on tomato plants carrying the Mi gene and race 3, which reproduces on both resistant pepper and tomato.

== History ==
Meloidogyne arenaria has the same history as the other root knot nematodes. Meloidogyne spp were originally grouped together with the cyst nematodes (Heterodera spp) but they were later separated after they were confirmed to be significantly different from each other. The changes that were made when discovering Meloidogyne spp of nematodes are described below:

- 1855 – Reverend Miles Joseph Berkeley (clergyman) noted galls on cucumbers in greenhouse in England. This was the first official report of nematodes that caused galls on plant roots.
- 1871 – Schmidt described Heterodera schactii, the sugarbeet cyst nematode.
- 1872 – Greeff described Anguillula radicicola – a nematode that caused galls on cereals and grasses, but this was actually Ditylenchus and not a root knot nematode.
- 1879 – Cornu described a root-knot nematode as Anguillula marioni.
- 1884 – Muller decided root-knot nematode was the same as Greeff's root-galling nematode and that both should be Heterodera – Heterodera radicicola.
- 1887 – Goeldi – Brazil – described a root knot on coffee – Meloidogyne exigua.
- 1932 – Goodey decided that use of Heterodera radicicola was incorrect according to International Rules of Zoological Nomenclature as original H. radicicola was not a root-knot nematode. He renamed it Heterodera marioni.
- 1949 – Chitwood removed them from Heterodera because they differed from cyst nematodes. Since the oldest name for the genus was Goeldi's Meloidogyne exigua, that name had precedence. Chitwood described five species based on perineal patterns, M. arenaria being one of the five.

== Distribution ==
Crop damage by this nematode is mostly faced in warmer regions and it is rarely found in areas where the average monthly temperatures approach freezing. The peanut root knot nematode, race 1 is found in all areas where peanuts are grown.

== Economic importance ==
The peanut root-knot nematode is the most serious nematode pest of the crop and questionably the most serious soil-borne disease problem. For example, the nematode is present in almost all fields where the crop is grown in Florida and economic damage is estimated to occur in greater than 50% of these fields. Individual peanut fields heavily infested with the root-knot nematode have sustained yield losses greater than 75%. In addition to causing considerable damage alone, it also increases the severity and incidence of other soil-borne diseases such as southern stem rot and Cylindrocladium blackrot. M. arenaria is C-rated pest in California.

== Morphology and anatomy ==
Different development stages of this nematode have unique features that are used to describe them. Among the characters commonly used to define nematode species and populations, morphometric characters have a marked significance.

Females are swollen, pear-shaped pearly white and sedentary. They deposit their eggs in a gelatinous mass, which usually protrudes from galled root tissue. Females of this nematode are completely endoparasitic. Mature females of M. arenaria are identified by the cuticular markings in the perineal area, stylet length, punctations on the cuticle. When describing the morphology of M. arenaria race 1, Eisenback et al. (1981) reported that in females, the dorsal arch is flattened and rounded. The striae in the arch are slightly indented at the lateral lines and generally form a shoulder on the arch. The stylet is very robust and the cone and shaft are broad. The labial disc and lips are dumb bell shaped and it has large lateral lips that are separated from the medial lips and the head region. In a study in Argentina, perineal patterns of 100 females from a population of M. arenaria, race 2 growing on tomato plants were analyzed and moderate morphological variations observed. The overall shape was rounded in most cases, but it was oval-shaped in a small proportion (4%). Forty-six percent of females showed low dorsal arch while 38% depicted a high dorsal arc, while the rest were intermediate. Lines in the post-anal region were smooth or wavy, continuous or broken, occasionally forming shoulders (18% of females). Wings were generally not observed. Phasmids were visible in 25% of the patterns and the mean distance between them was 24.33 ± 1.61 mm. Only seven out of one hundred females presented perineal patterns with lateral lines weakly demarcated by forked striae. Adult females were pyriform and lacking a terminal protuberance in the posterior area of the body. The female body lengths ranged between 465 mm and 1,129 mm. The excretory pore of the females was located closer to the base of the stylet than to the median bulb, at approximately 2-stylet lengths, in agreement with a typical M. arenaria specimen. The stylet was dorsally curved.

Second stage juveniles of this nematode are short (400–600 micrometers) with very short stylets (10-15micrometers). The stylet is lightly sclerotized with indistinct Knobs. The cephalic framework is also weakly sclerotized. The esophageal gland overlaps the intestine ventrally and the tail tapers to a pointed tip with a clear terminus In a study, second stage juveniles (J2s) averaged 458.51 ± 20.48 mm in length and 15.35 ± 0.76 mm in width. The rectum was undilated. Tail length (from anus to posterior end) was 56.21 ± 2.78 mm and the tail tip was rounded.

Males of M. arenaria are long (1.0 to 2.0 mm). The stylet is short and has distinct knobs. The esophageal gland overlaps the intestine ventrally. The tail is short and rounded and has no bursa. Spicules open a short distance from the tail tip. The males also have a head cap that is low and slopes posteriorly with 2 or 3 incomplete annulations around the head region. The stylet is pointed and the lumen opening has a small protuberance on the ventral side. From their study, Garcı´a and Sa´nchez-Puerta, (2012) also reported that the mean length of the male body was 1.6 ± 0.31 mm. The head of the males was flat to concave and showed a moderately elevated labial disc. The males also had four lateral lines, which were easily observed.

== Symptoms of root knot disease of peanut ==
These nematodes cause symptoms both on leaves and roots. Foliar symptoms of root-knot disease may be expressed at any time during the growing season. These symptoms of nematode damage on peanut plants range from stunting, yellowing, wilting and even plant death. Ferris (1999–2012), also reported that nematodes cause yellowing; mid-day wilting; symptoms of water and nutrient stress; and sometimes death, especially if the nematode is interacting with other organisms. They can appear in a peanut crop beginning about 100 days after planting or after periods of dry hot weather. Areas of root-knot nematode damaged peanut are usually round to oblong in shape, and rows of infected plants may never overlap as those of healthy plants. It is common for plants to wilt and eventually die in areas where nematode populations are high.

Root symptoms are similar to those caused by all nematodes including a reduction in number of feeder roots and root stunting, but root knot nematodes cause unique symptoms on roots and pods. Nematodes cause galls (knots) to form on both roots and pods of the peanut, and these galls are highly diagnostic for root-knot nematode presence compared to other nematodes affecting peanut. The presence of galls on roots, pegs and pods appears as single or multiple wart-like growths that may or may not be discolored. As root knot nematode infection progresses, and generally later in the season, secondary root and pod rots cause further damage and eventual death of the plants.

Many soil-borne fungi, especially Sclerotium rolfsii (which causes southern stem rot) and Sclerotinia minor (which causes Sclerotinia blight), will infect the weakened peanut plants and cause more plant death. Root knot nematode infection of the peg weakens the peg so that it breaks during harvest, contributing to additional yield losses because the detached pods are then left in the soil. Infection of the pods leads to a decline in yield quality.

The damage threshold, or the initial nematode population density at which peanut yields begin to decline, has been reported to be in the range of 1 to 10 eggs and second stage juveniles per 500 cm3 soil for M. arenaria on susceptible peanut cultivars.

== Reproduction and life cycle ==
Reproduction occurs mitotically by parthenogenesis and the species has chromosome numbers that range from 30 to 50 The life cycle of all Meloidoigyne spp is similar but they have different temperature requirements. At temperatures ranging from 32.8 to 39.50C, M. arenaria reached the egg laying stage in about 21 days on peanut and completed its life cycle in 32 days. The population levels increased faster from a starting level of 10 juveniles per plant that from 1000 or 10,000 per plant.

Adult females deposit eggs into a protective gelatinous matrix, near or just outside the root surface. A single female lays about 500 to 1,500 eggs during her life, which lasts about two to three months. Eggs hatch only under favorable conditions, such as adequate moisture and warm temperatures. Root knot nematode development begins inside the egg. After the completion of embryogenesis, the first-stage juvenile remains inside the egg until it molts into the second stage juvenile. The first stage juvenile (J1) lacks a stylet. Second stage juveniles (J2) hatch from the egg and move freely in the soil in quest for a suitable host plant. Once they find suitable host and enter the root with the help of the stylet, they start to feed within 24 hours, inducing giant cells to form. J2s then molt thrice (to J3, J4 and then the adult) before they mature in to adults. Adult males remain vermiform and get out of the root while females swell and obtain the pyriform/round shape. Females lay eggs in the gelatinous matrix which hatch again and the cycle is repeated if environmental conditions are favorable. The length of the life cycle depends on environmental factors mostly temperature and host status. It may take about 1 month to complete the life cycle. The nematodes also have a very high reproductive rate.

== Feeding behavior ==
Just like the other root knot nematodes, to be able to feed within the host, this nematode must establish an interaction with the plant. J2s are attracted to the root tip in the zone of elongation and the areas of lateral root emergence. Initially it was reported that they are attracted by CO_{2}, and apparently by small molecules that are dialysable – perhaps amino acids. Recent studies suggest that the attraction may not be to CO_{2} but to lower pH resulting from carbonic acid formed from the CO_{2} in solution.

The second juvenile (J2) penetrates zone of elongation by mechanical (stylet thrusts) and probably chemical (cellulase and pectinase) means. It moves between, rather than through, cortical cells towards root apex, turns at the meristem, and migrates back to the vascular cylinder in the zone of cell differentiation. Once the J2 is in the root, they migrate intracellularly to the provascular cells and begin to parasitize cells within 24 hours. The nematode initiates formation of the giant cell (also called a nurse cell) from potential vascular tissue. Sub ventral gland become prominent after penetrating the root, and it could be playing a role of secreting enzymes that play a role in the formation of the giant cell which is a large cell with several nuclei. Giant cell are very large in size (100 fold increase), with reduced vacuoles and they are multinucleate containing about 40 to 100 nuclei. The female feeds from the giant cell as it expands further posteriorly accumulating eggs. After formation of the giant cells, gall development occurs though these two events are separate. Galls result from hypertrophy and hyperplasia of the cells around the giant cells. Growth regulators (IAA) are thought to have a role in cell enlargement since they increases cell wall plasticity.

== Host range ==
M. arenaria parasitizes peanut, vegetables, grasses, fruit ornamentals and tobacco. The root-knot nematode, M. arenaria can infect almost every plant family. While characterizing the host range of the peanut root knot nematode, López-Pérez et al., 2011, reported that the most frequent hosts of the peanut root knot nematode were vegetables, fruit trees, tobacco, grapevine, and weeds.

== Management ==
- Plant resistant cultivars: Although genes conferring resistance to peanut root knot nematode have not been found in cultivated peanut, other Arachis spp. have been identified to be highly resistant or immune to the peanut root knot nematode. Simpson and Starr (1991) and Garcia et al. (1996) reported successful crosses to transfer a high level of nematode resistance into A. hypogaea. The resistance was obtained from a wild species, Arachis cardenasii. Resistance was obtained by introgression of resistance genes into A. hypogaea using a series of backcrosses. Examples of resistant peanut varieties are COAN and NemaTAM. Both cultivars are highly susceptible to tomato spotted wilt virus and prevalent fungal diseases. In 2008, however, the USDA released a cultivar, Tifguard, which has resistance to both tomato spotted wilt virus and root-knot nematode.
- Rotation with crops that are poor or non-hosts of the nematode. Two year rotations with cotton, bahai grass, or velvet bean are effective also.
- Use of nematicides as needed. Management of root-knot nematodes on peanut has traditionally relied primarily on treatment of infested fields with nematicides such as granular aldicarb (Temik) or the fumigant 1,3-dichloropropene (Telone). Nematicides are usually recommended for high value crops such as peanuts, tobacco and peach.
- Plant tolerant varieties. Crop yields will not be affected even in the presence of M. arenaria.

== Promising ongoing research and other issues ==
- Plant breeders and nematologists are actively pursuing the incorporation of the root-knot nematode resistance into varieties adapted to the disease situation in the southeastern U.S. Tifguard is the first of many future varieties that will be released from peanut breeding programs including the UF/IFAS peanut breeding program. These resistant varieties will not solve the peanut root knot nematode problems in peanut production; however, they hold great promise to reduce losses from this disease by more than 50%.
- Since neither COAN nor NemaTAM are resistant to the tomato spotted wilt virus (Tospovirus, family Bunyaviridae), efforts to introgress resistance into other high yielding peanut varieties is ongoing. This will reduce crop losses in the areas with high incidences of the virus. The tomato spotted wilt virus, which causes substantial yield losses in Georgia, Alabama, and Florida.

== Points to ponder ==
- The resistance in Tifguard and other varieties that will soon be released is the same single dominant gene. Continuous planting of peanut with this gene in the same fields is likely to eventually lead to resistance-breaking nematode biotypes. This can be delayed or prevented by utilizing proper crop rotation and even planting non-resistant peanut in the rotation as well.
- Secondly, this resistance does not reduce damage from lesion nematodes which are a major problem in peanut production in the central peninsular production area of Florida.

== See also ==
- Coffee root-knot nematode
