= Purpureocillium sodanum =

Scientific classification
- Domain: Eukaryota
- Kingdom: Fungi
- Division: Ascomycota
- Class: Sordariomycetes
- Order: Hypocreales
- Family: Ophiocordycipitaceae
- Genus: Purpureocillium
- Species: P. sodanum

Binomial name
- Purpureocillium sodanum Papizadeh, Soudi, Wijayaw., Shahz.-Faz. & K.D. Hyde (2016)

Species of fungus

Purpureocillium sodanum is a species of fungus in the genus Purpureocillium in the order of Hypocreales.
