= Gnomonia rubi =

Scientific classification
- Kingdom: Fungi
- Division: Ascomycota
- Class: Sordariomycetes
- Order: Diaporthales
- Family: Gnomoniaceae
- Genus: Gnomonia
- Species: G. rubi

Binomial name
- Gnomonia rubi Rehm, (1885)

Species of fungus

Gnomonia rubi is a fungal plant pathogen that causes cane canker on Rubus.
