= Root invasion (parasitic) =

Parasitic Root invasion is the invasion of plant root systems by parasitic pathogens, such as root-knot nematode and other nematodes.
