= Gnomonia fructicola =

Scientific classification
- Kingdom: Fungi
- Division: Ascomycota
- Class: Sordariomycetes
- Order: Diaporthales
- Family: Gnomoniaceae
- Genus: Gnomonia
- Species: G. fructicola

Binomial name
- Gnomonia fructicola (Arnaud) Sogonov

Synonyms
- Gnomonia fragariae

Species of fungus

Fruit rot of strawberry
- Causal agents: Gnomonia fructicola
- Hosts: Strawberries
- EPPO Code: GNOMFR
- Distribution: Canada (British Columbia), Europe (Belgium, France) and U.S.A. (MD, NY)

Gnomonia fructicola is a fungal plant pathogen on strawberries causing leaf spot disease. It can overwinter on leaves and fruits of Fragaria spp. (Rosaceae), occasionally pathogenic on fruits causing strawberry stem-end rot. The causal organism has often been referred to as Gnomonia comari, now considered Gnomoniopsis comari. It occurs in Canada (British Columbia), Europe (Belgium, France) and U.S.A. (MD, NY).
