= Leptothyrium nervisedum =

Scientific classification
- Kingdom: Fungi
- Division: Ascomycota
- Class: Dothideomycetes
- Order: Pleosporales
- Genus: Leptothyrium
- Species: L. nervisedum

Binomial name
- Leptothyrium nervisedum Cole, (1933)

Species of fungus

Leptothyrium nervisedum is an ascomycete fungus that is a plant pathogen.
