= Gnomonia dispora =

Scientific classification
- Kingdom: Fungi
- Division: Ascomycota
- Class: Sordariomycetes
- Order: Diaporthales
- Family: Gnomoniaceae
- Genus: Gnomonia
- Species: G. dispora

Binomial name
- Gnomonia dispora Demaree & Cole, (1936)

Species of fungus

Gnomonia dispora is a fungal plant pathogen. It was first described by J. B. Demaree and J. R. Cole in 1936.
