= Gnomonia nerviseda =

Scientific classification
- Kingdom: Fungi
- Division: Ascomycota
- Class: Sordariomycetes
- Order: Diaporthales
- Family: Gnomoniaceae
- Genus: Gnomonia
- Species: G. nerviseda

Binomial name
- Gnomonia nerviseda Cole, (1933)

Species of fungus

Gnomonia nerviseda is a fungal plant pathogen. It has been found to cause vein spot disease in pecan trees.
