= Gnomonia caryae =

Scientific classification
- Kingdom: Fungi
- Division: Ascomycota
- Class: Sordariomycetes
- Order: Diaporthales
- Family: Gnomoniaceae
- Genus: Gnomonia
- Species: G. caryae

Binomial name
- Gnomonia caryae F.A. Wolf

Species of fungus

Gnomonia caryae is a fungal plant pathogen. It causes spots on leaves.
