= Ragnhildiana diffusa =

Scientific classification
- Kingdom: Fungi
- Division: Ascomycota
- Class: Dothideomycetes
- Order: Mycosphaerellales
- Family: Mycosphaerellaceae
- Genus: Ragnhildiana
- Species: R. diffusa

Binomial name
- Ragnhildiana diffusa (Heald & F.A. Wolf) Videira & Crous (2017)

Synonyms
- Clasterosporium diffusum Heald & F.A. Wolf (1911); Sirosporium diffusum (Heald & F.A. Wolf) Deighton (1976)

Species of fungus

Ragnhildiana diffusa is an ascomycete fungus that is a plant pathogen, infecting pecan.
