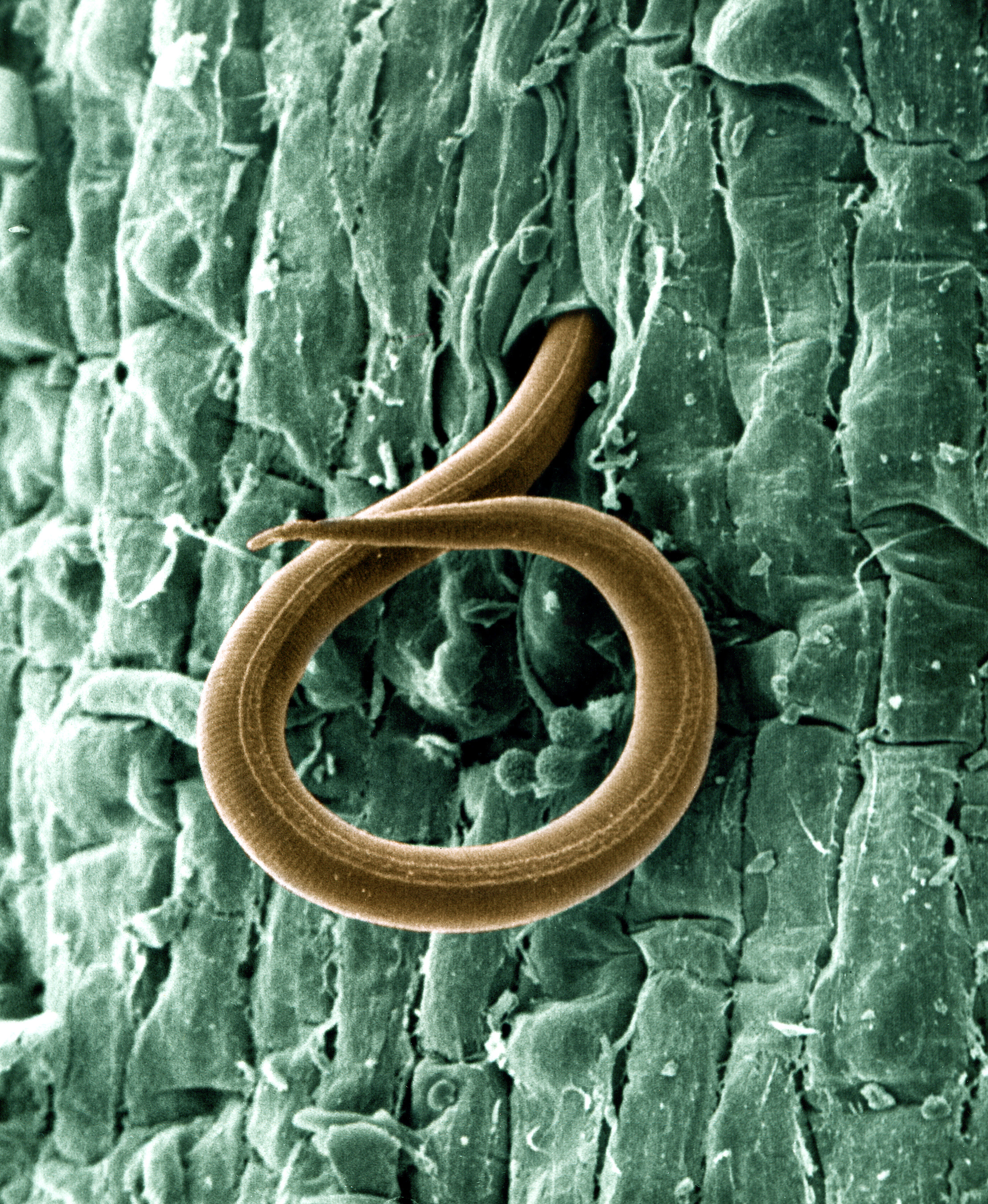
- Larva of root-knot nematode, Meloidogyne incognita, magnified 500×, shown here penetrating a tomato root

Scientific classification
- Kingdom: Animalia
- Phylum: Nematoda
- Class: Chromadorea
- Order: Rhabditida
- Family: Meloidogynidae
- Genus: Meloidogyne; Göldi, 1892

Species
- See text

= Root-knot nematode =

Genus of parasitic worms

Root-knot nematodes are plant-parasitic nematodes from the genus Meloidogyne. They exist in soil in areas with hot climates or short winters. About 2000 species of plants worldwide are susceptible to infection by root-knot nematodes and they cause approximately 5% of global crop loss. Root-knot nematode larvae infect plant roots, causing the development of root-knot galls that drain the plant's photosynthate and nutrients. Infection of young plants may be lethal, while infection of mature plants causes decreased yield.

== Economic impact ==
Root-knot nematodes (Meloidogyne spp.) are one of the three most economically damaging genera of plant-parasitic nematodes on horticultural and field crops. Root-knot nematodes are distributed worldwide, and are obligate parasites of the roots of thousands of plant species, including monocotyledonous and dicotyledonous, herbaceous and woody plants. The genus includes more than 90 species, with some species having several races. Four Meloidogyne species (M. javanica, M. arenaria, M. incognita, and M. hapla) are major pests worldwide, with another seven being important on a local basis. Meloidogyne occurs in 23 of 43 crops listed as having plant-parasitic nematodes of major importance, ranging from field crops, through pasture and grasses, to horticultural, ornamental and vegetable crops. If root-knot nematodes become established in deep-rooted, perennial crops, control is difficult and options are limited.

Meloidogyne spp. were first reported in cassava by Neal in 1889. Damage on cassava is variable depending on cultivar planted, and can range from negligible to serious. Early-season infection leads to worse damage. In most crops, nematode damage reduces plant health and growth; in cassava, though, nematode damage sometimes leads to increased aerial growth as the plants try to compensate. This possibly enables the plant to maintain a reasonable level of production. Therefore, aerial correlations to nematode density can be positive, negative or not at all. Vegetable crops grown in warm climates can experience severe losses from root-knot nematodes, and are often routinely treated with a chemical nematicide. Root-knot nematode damage results in poor growth, a decline in quality and yield of the crop and reduced resistance to other stresses, both biotic and abiotic. A high level of damage can lead to total crop loss. Damage is often most severe under moderate drought conditions, and Nematode-damaged roots do not use water and fertilizers as effectively, leading to additional losses for the grower. In cassava, it has been suggested that levels of Meloidogyne spp. that are sufficient to cause injury rarely occur naturally. However, with changing farming systems, in a disease complex or weakened by other factors, nematode damage is likely to be associated with other problems.

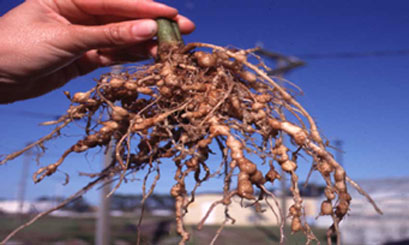
Root-knot galls

== Control ==
Root-knot nematodes can be controlled with biocontrol agents Paecilomyces lilacinus, Pasteuria penetrans and Juglone. Certain saponins have shown effectiveness in trials, though more research is required prior to commercial availability.

== Life cycle ==
All nematodes pass through an embryonic stage, four juvenile stages (J1–J4) and an adult stage. Juvenile Meloidogynes parasites hatch from eggs as vermiform, second-stage juveniles (J2), the first moult having occurred within the egg. Newly hatched juveniles have a short free-living stage in the soil, in the rhizosphere of the host plants. They may reinvade the host plants of their parent or migrate through the soil to find a new host root. J2 larvae do not feed during the free-living stage, but use lipids stored in the gut.

An excellent model system for the study of the parasitic behaviour of plant-parasitic nematodes has been developed using Arabidopsis thaliana as a model host. The Arabidopsis roots are initially small and transparent, enabling every detail to be seen. Invasion and migration in the root was studied using M. incognita. Briefly, second stage juveniles invade in the root elongation region and migrate in the root until they became sedentary. Oesophageal gland secretions from the J2 promote parenchyma cells within the stele near the head of the nematode to become multinucleate to form feeding cells, generally known as giant cells, from which the J2 and later the adults feed. Multinucleation is achieved through multiple mitotic cycles of the nucleus paired with uncoupled cytokinesis, leading to several independent nuclei existing within a single cell wall. It is important to distinguish between this process and the formation of syncytia, commonly seen in Soybean Cyst Nematode infections, which form multinucleate feeding cells through the fusion of adjacent cells. Giant cells become highly metabolically active, constituting a sink of nutrient for the developing nematode. Concomitant with giant cell formation, the surrounding root tissue gives rise to a gall in which the developing juvenile is embedded. Juveniles first feed from the giant cells about 24 hours after becoming sedentary.

After further feeding, the J2s undergo morphological changes and become saccate. Without further feeding, they moult three times and eventually become adults. In females, which are close to spherical, feeding resumes and the reproductive system develops. The life span of an adult female may extend to three months, and many hundreds of eggs can be produced. Females can continue egg laying after harvest of aerial parts of the plant and the survival stage between crops is generally within the egg.

The length of the life cycle is temperature-dependent. The relationship between rate of development and temperature is linear over much of the root-knot nematode life cycle, though it is possible the component stages of the life cycle, e.g. egg development, host root invasion or growth, have slightly different optima. Species within the genus Meloidogyne also have different temperature optima. In M. javanica, development occurs between 13 and 34 °C, with optimal development at about 29 °C.

=== Gelatinous matrix ===
Root-knot nematode females lay eggs into a gelatinous matrix produced by six rectal glands and secreted before and during egg laying. The matrix initially forms a canal through the outer layers of root tissue and later surrounds the eggs, providing a barrier to water loss by maintaining a high moisture level around the eggs. As the gelatinous matrix ages, it becomes tanned, turning from a sticky, colourless jelly to an orange-brown substance which appears layered.

=== Egg formation and development ===
Egg formation in M. javanica has been studied in detail, and is similar to egg formation in the well studied, free-living nematode Caenorhabditis elegans. Embryogenesis has also been studied, and the stages of development are easily identifiable with a phase contrast microscope following preparation of an egg mass squash. The egg is formed as one cell, with two-cell, four-cell and eight-cell stages recognisable. Further cell division leads to the tadpole stage, with further elongation resulting in the first stage juvenile, which is roughly four times as long as the egg. The J1 stage of C. elegans has 558 cells, and the J1 of M. javanica likely has a similar number, since all nematodes are morphologically and anatomically similar. The egg shell has three layers, with the vitelline layer outermost, then a chitinous layer and a lipid layer innermost.

=== Egg hatching ===
Preceded by induced changes in eggshell permeability, hatching may involve physical and/or enzymatic processes in plant-parasitic nematodes. Cyst nematodes, such as Globodera rostochiensis, may require a specific signal from the root exudates of the host to trigger hatching. Root-knot nematodes are generally unaffected by the presence of a host, but hatch freely at the appropriate temperature when water is available. However, in an egg mass or cyst, not all eggs will hatch when the conditions are optimal for their particular species, leaving some eggs to hatch at a later date. Ammonium ions have been shown to inhibit hatching and to reduce the plant-penetration ability of M. incognita juveniles that do hatch.

=== Reproduction ===
Root-knot nematodes exhibit a range of reproductive modes, including sexuality (amphimixis), facultative sexuality, meiotic parthenogenesis (automixis) and mitotic parthenogenesis (apomixis).

== Species ==
- Meloidogyne acronea
- Meloidogyne ardenensis Santos, 1968
- Meloidogyne arenaria
- Meloidogyne artiellia
- Meloidogyne brevicauda
- Meloidogyne chitwoodi
- Meloidogyne coffeicola
- Meloidogyne enterolobii
- Meloidogine exigua
- Meloidogyne hapla
- Meloidogyne incognita
- Meloidogyne javanica
- Meloidogyne luci
- Meloidogyne naasi
- Meloidogyne partityla
- Meloidogyne thamesi
