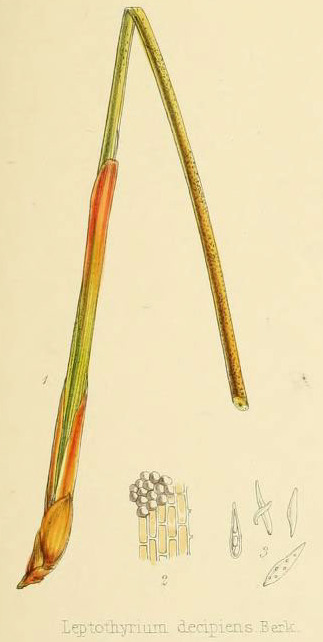
- Leptothyrium decipiens

Scientific classification
- Domain: Eukaryota
- Kingdom: Fungi
- Division: Ascomycota
- Class: Dothideomycetes
- Order: Pleosporales
- Genus: Leptothyrium; Kunze (1823)

Synonyms
- Manginulopsis Bat. & Peres (1963); Myxodiscus Höhn. (1906); Rhabdothyrella Höhn. (1917); Rhabdothyrium Höhn. (1915)

= Leptothyrium =

Genus of fungi

Leptothyrium is a genus of fungi belonging to the order Pleosporales, family unknown.

The genus has an almost cosmopolitan distribution.

Species: (list is highly incomplete)

- Leptothyrium acerigenum Kabát & Bubák
- Leptothyrium aegiphilae Henn.
- Leptothyrium aegiphilae Syd. & P.Syd.
