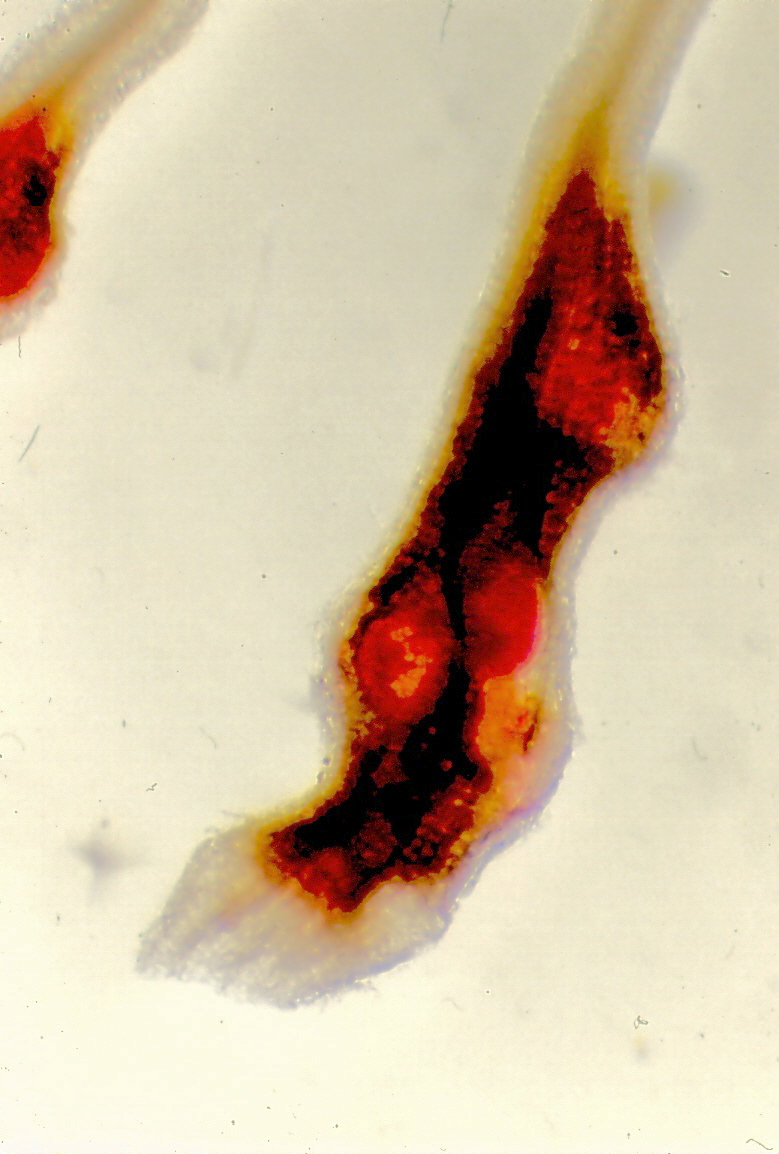
- Meloidogyne Arenaria Females

Scientific classification
- Kingdom: Animalia
- Phylum: Nematoda
- Class: Chromadorea
- Order: Rhabditida
- Family: Meloidogynidae

= Meloidogynidae =

Family of roundworms

Meloidogynidae is a family of nematodes belonging to the order Rhabditida.

Genera:

- Meloidoderella Khan, 1972
- Meloidogyne Goeldi, 1892
- Spartonema Siddiqi, 1986
