= List of Pseudocercospora species =

This is a list of the fungus species in the genus Pseudocercospora. Many are plant pathogens. As of 5 September 2023, the GBIF lists up to 1,540 species, while Species Fungorum lists about 1,517 species (out of 1,660 records). Over 1000 species are accepted by Wijayawardene et al. 2020.

This list of name, authority and dates is based on the Species Fungorum list.

== A ==
- Pseudocercospora abacopteridicola (J.M. Yen & Lim) J.M. Yen (1980)
- Pseudocercospora abeliae (Katsuki) Nishij., C. Nakash. & Tak. Kobay. (1999)
- Pseudocercospora abelmoschi (Ellis & Everh.) Deighton (1976)
- Pseudocercospora aberrans (Petr.) Deighton (1987)
- Pseudocercospora abri Deighton (1987)
- Pseudocercospora abricola (Boedijn) U. Braun (2001)
- Pseudocercospora abutilonicola (Chupp) U. Braun & Crous (2002)
- Pseudocercospora acaciae Kamal & R.P. Singh (1980)
- Pseudocercospora acaciae-confusae (Sawada) Goh & W.H. Hsieh (1989)
- Pseudocercospora acaciigena Crous & M.J. Wingf. (2004)
- Pseudocercospora acalyphae (Lacy & Thirum.) Raghu Ram, Mallaiah & U. Braun (1995)
- Pseudocercospora acalyphicola (J.M. Yen) J.M. Yen (1980)
- Pseudocercospora acalyphincola (Petr.) Deighton (1976)
- Pseudocercospora acanthi Deighton (1987)
- Pseudocercospora acericola (Woron.) Y.L. Guo & X.J. Liu (1992)
- Pseudocercospora acerosa U. Braun & M.A. Dick (2002)
- Pseudocercospora acetosellae (Ellis) U. Braun (1997)
- Pseudocercospora aciculina (Chupp) U. Braun & Crous (2003)
- Pseudocercospora aciotidis (Chupp) U. Braun & Crous (2002)
- Pseudocercospora ackamae U. Braun & C.F. Hill (2008)
- Pseudocercospora acosmii-subelegantis A. Hern.-Gut., Z.M. Chaves & Dianese (2015)
- Pseudocercospora acrocarpicola (Agnihothr.) Kamal (2010)
- Pseudocercospora actinidiae Deighton (1976)
- Pseudocercospora actinidiicola Goh & W.H. Hsieh (1989)
- Pseudocercospora actinostemmatis Sawada ex Goh & W.H. Hsieh (1987)
- Pseudocercospora acuminata (S. Das) Kamal (2010)
- Pseudocercospora adansoniae McTaggart & R.G. Shivas (2010)
- Pseudocercospora adenosmae Y.L. Guo (2001)
- Pseudocercospora adianti (Syd.) Deighton (1976)
- Pseudocercospora adinae A.K. Singh, Kamal & H.B. Singh (2003)
- Pseudocercospora adinandrae Y.L. Guo & X.J. Liu (1992)
- Pseudocercospora adinicola (A.K. Kar & M. Mandal) Deighton (1976)
- Pseudocercospora adonidis (Gonz. Frag.) U. Braun & Crous (2003)
- Pseudocercospora aeschynomenicola Meir. Silva, R.W. Barreto & Crous (2016)
- Pseudocercospora aethiopicae Deighton (1976)
- Pseudocercospora afgoiensis E. Castell. & Gullino (1983)
- Pseudocercospora agarwalii (Chupp) U. Braun & Bagyan. (1999)
- Pseudocercospora ageratoides (Ellis & Everh.) Y.L. Guo (1993)
- Pseudocercospora agharkarii (Chidd.) Crous & M.E. Palm (1999)
- Pseudocercospora ahmadiana U. Braun (1995)
- Pseudocercospora ailanthicola (Patw.) Deighton (1976)
- Pseudocercospora airliensis R.G. Shivas, Marney & Y.P. Tan (2014)
- Pseudocercospora alangii Y.L. Guo & X.J. Liu (1989)
- Pseudocercospora alchemillae (Syd.) U. Braun & Crous (2003)
- Pseudocercospora allamandae (J.M. Yen) J.M. Yen (1980)
- Pseudocercospora allophyli (Hansf.) Deighton (1987)
- Pseudocercospora allophylicola Deighton (1987)
- Pseudocercospora allophylina Sawada ex Goh & W.H. Hsieh (1987)
- Pseudocercospora allophylorum (A.K. Kar & M. Mandal) Bagyan., U. Braun & Jagad. (1995)
- Pseudocercospora alocasiicola U. Braun & McKenzie (1999)
- Pseudocercospora alpiniae S.Q. Chen & P.K. Chi (1990)
- Pseudocercospora alpiniae-katsumadicola (S.Q. Chen & P.K. Chi) U. Braun & Crous (2003)
- Pseudocercospora alpiniicola S.Q. Chen & P.K. Chi (1990)
- Pseudocercospora alstoniae Goh & W.H. Hsieh (1989)
- Pseudocercospora alternantherae J.M. Yen, A.K. Kar & B.K. Das (1982)
- Pseudocercospora alternantherae-nodiflorae (Sawada) Goh & W.H. Hsieh (1987)
- Pseudocercospora alternanthericola (Pavgi & U.P. Singh) Deighton (1976)
- Pseudocercospora amaranthicola (J.M. Yen) J.M. Yen (1979)
- Pseudocercospora amasoniae U. Braun & F.O. Freire (2004)
- Pseudocercospora amelanchieris C. Nakash., Tak. Kobay. & Crous (2016)
- Pseudocercospora amomi (A.K. Kar & M. Mandal) Deighton (1987)
- Pseudocercospora amoorae A.K. Das (1991)
- Pseudocercospora ampelopsidis Crous, U. Braun & H.D. Shin (2012)
- Pseudocercospora anacardii E. Castell. & Casulli (1981)
- Pseudocercospora anamirtae (Bhalla, K. Srivast. & A.K. Srivast.) Kamal (2010)
- Pseudocercospora andirae U. Braun & Urtiaga (2012)
- Pseudocercospora anemopsidis (Chupp) U. Braun & Crous (2002)
- Pseudocercospora angiopteridis Goh & W.H. Hsieh (1989)
- Pseudocercospora angolensis (T. Carvalho & O. Mendes) Crous & U. Braun (2003)
- Pseudocercospora angraeci (Feuilleaub. & Roum.) U. Braun & Urtiaga (2013)
- Pseudocercospora angularis W.S. Lisboa, D.M. Macedo & R.W. Barreto (2017)e
- Pseudocercospora angulomaculae (A.K. Kar & M. Mandal) U. Braun & Crous (2003)
- Pseudocercospora angustata (Chupp & Solheim) Deighton (1976)
- Pseudocercospora anisomelicola Sawada ex Goh & W.H. Hsieh (1987)
- Pseudocercospora annellidica A. Hern.-Gut. & Dianese (2013)
- Pseudocercospora annonacea (Kamal, Narayan & R.P. Verma) U. Braun (1994)
- Pseudocercospora annonae U. Braun & Crous (2002)
- Pseudocercospora annonae-squamosae U. Braun & R.F. Castañeda (1989)
- Pseudocercospora annonarum (Petr. & Cif.) U. Braun & Crous (2008)
- Pseudocercospora annonicola Goh & W.H. Hsieh (1990)
- Pseudocercospora annonifolii (Bat. & Peres) U. Braun & F.O. Freire (2003)
- Pseudocercospora anogeissi U. Braun & Kamal (2003)
- Pseudocercospora anogeissina P. Sharma & Majumdar (2003)
- Pseudocercospora anomala (Berk. & M.A. Curtis) de Hoog (1992)
- Pseudocercospora anthocephali (Tak. Kobay.) Deighton (1990)
- Pseudocercospora anthocleistae (J.M. Yen & Gilles) Deighton (1976)
- Pseudocercospora antidesmatis (A.K. Kar & M. Mandal) Deighton (1987)
- Pseudocercospora apeibae U. Braun & Urtiaga (2013)
- Pseudocercospora aphanamixidis M.K. Khan, M.S. Khan bis & Kamal (1994)
- Pseudocercospora apocynacearum B.K. Gupta & Kamal (1987)
- Pseudocercospora aquae-emendadasensis A. Hern.-Gut., Z.M. Chaves & Dianese (2015)
- Pseudocercospora aracearum U. Braun & McKenzie (1999)
- Pseudocercospora arachniodis Y.L. Guo (1993)
- Pseudocercospora araliae (Henn.) Deighton (1976)
- Pseudocercospora aranetae Borlaza & Roldan ex J.M. Yen (1980)
- Pseudocercospora ardisiicola B.K. Gupta & Kamal (1987)
- Pseudocercospora arecacearum U. Braun & C.F. Hill (2006)
- Pseudocercospora argyreiae (Govindu & Thirum.) A.K. Das & Sarbajna (1990)
- Pseudocercospora argyreiigena Y.L. Guo (2012)
- Pseudocercospora argyrolobii (Chupp & Doidge) Deighton (1976)
- Pseudocercospora argythamniae (Dearn. & House) U. Braun & Crous (2003)
- Pseudocercospora aristolochiana Kamal (2010)
- Pseudocercospora aristoteliae (Cooke) Deighton (1976)
- Pseudocercospora arrabidaeae R. Kirschner (2006)
- Pseudocercospora artanthes (Henn.) Crous, Alfenas & R.W. Barreto (1997)
- Pseudocercospora artemisiicola Y.L. Guo (1997)
- Pseudocercospora artocarpi (Syd. & P. Syd.) Deighton (1976)
- Pseudocercospora artocarpicola U. Braun & McKenzie (1999)
- Pseudocercospora arunjae B. Sutton (1994)
- Pseudocercospora asclepiadina (Speg.) Deighton (1976)
- Pseudocercospora asiatica H.S.G. Rao, Arch. Singh & Kamal (1998)
- Pseudocercospora asiminae (Ellis & Morgan) U. Braun & Crous (2008)
- Pseudocercospora asiminae-pygmaeae U. Braun (1995)
- Pseudocercospora asphodelina (Sacc.) U. Braun (1993)
- Pseudocercospora aspidospermatis (Bat., Peres & R. Garnier) Dianese & M.P.S. Câmara (1994)
- Pseudocercospora assamensis Arzanlou & Crous (2008)
- Pseudocercospora asteracearum R.K. Verma & Kamal (1992)
- Pseudocercospora astronii A. Hern.-Gut. & Dianese (2009)
- Pseudocercospora astroniicola U. Braun & F.O. Freire (2003)
- Pseudocercospora astroniiphila A. Hern.-Gut. & Dianese (2009)
- Pseudocercospora asystasiae (J.M. Yen) J.M. Yen (1980)
- Pseudocercospora athyrii Goh & W.H. Hsieh (1989)
- Pseudocercospora atrofiliformis (J.M. Yen, T.C. Lo & C.C. Chi) J.M. Yen (1981)
- Pseudocercospora atrofuliginosa F.B. Rocha, U. Braun & R.W. Barreto (2010)
- Pseudocercospora atromarginalis (G.F. Atk.) Deighton (1976)
- Pseudocercospora atrovelutina Deighton (1976)
- Pseudocercospora atylosiae (Thirum. & Govindu) U. Braun & Crous (2003)
- Pseudocercospora aurelianae Firmino & O.L. Pereira (2013)
- Pseudocercospora austroplenckiae A. Hern.-Gut. & Dianese (2009)
- Pseudocercospora avicenniae R.G. Shivas, A.J. Young & Crous (2009)
- Pseudocercospora avicenniicola U. Braun & F.O. Freire (2010)
- Pseudocercospora azanzae (Yadav) Deighton (1976)

== B ==
- Pseudocercospora bagdogrensis (A.K. Kar & M. Mandal) Deighton (1987)
- Pseudocercospora bakeriana Deighton (1976)
- Pseudocercospora balsaminae (Syd.) Deighton (1976)
- Pseudocercospora balsaminicola (J.M. Yen & Lim) U. Braun & Crous (2003)
- Pseudocercospora bambusae Saikia & A.K. Sarbhoy (1986)
- Pseudocercospora bangalorensis (Thirum. & Chupp) Deighton (1976)
- Pseudocercospora banisteriopsidis-megaphyllae A. Hern.-Gut. & Dianese (2013)
- Pseudocercospora baphiae Deighton (1981)
- Pseudocercospora baphicacanthi Goh & W.H. Hsieh (1989)
- Pseudocercospora barleriae (J.M. Yen & Lim) U. Braun (2001)
- Pseudocercospora barringtoniae-acutangulae U. Braun & Mouch. (2000)
- Pseudocercospora barringtoniicola U. Braun & Mouch. (1999)
- Pseudocercospora barringtoniigena U. Braun & Mouch. (2000)
- Pseudocercospora baruipurensis Sarbajna (1990)
- Pseudocercospora basellae Goh & W.H. Hsieh (1989)
- Pseudocercospora basiramifera Crous (1998)
- Pseudocercospora basitruncata Crous (1998)
- Pseudocercospora bauhiniae (Syd. & P. Syd.) Deighton (1976)
- Pseudocercospora bauhiniana Kamal (2010)
- Pseudocercospora bauhiniicola (J.M. Yen) J.M. Yen (1979)
- Pseudocercospora bauhiniigena M.K. Khan, M.S. Khan bis & Kamal (1994)
- Pseudocercospora beaucarneae (Pollack & D.F. Farr) U. Braun (2014)
- Pseudocercospora beijingensis Y. Zhang ter & Q. Wang (2019)
- Pseudocercospora beilschmiediae U. Braun & C.F. Hill (2003)
- Pseudocercospora berberidis-vulgaris S.P. Gautam, P.K. Rajak & Malaviya (1983)
- Pseudocercospora bernardiae (F. Stevens) U. Braun (2001)
- Pseudocercospora berryae Deighton (1979)
- Pseudocercospora bertholletiae (F.C. Albuq.) U. Braun & F.O. Freire (2004)
- Pseudocercospora besleriae U. Braun & Urtiaga (2008)
- Pseudocercospora bhopalensis Deighton (1976)
- Pseudocercospora bignoniacearum B.K. Gupta & Kamal (1987)
- Pseudocercospora biophyti (Syd. & P. Syd.) Deighton (1976)
- Pseudocercospora biophyticola P.N. Singh, Kharwar & H.S.G. Rao (1997)
- Pseudocercospora bischofiae (W. Yamam.) Deighton (1987)
- Pseudocercospora bischofigena Sh. Kumar & Raghv. Singh (2015)
- Pseudocercospora bixae (Allesch. & F. Noack) Crous, Alfenas & R.W. Barreto (1997)
- Pseudocercospora bixicola Goh & W.H. Hsieh (1990)
- Pseudocercospora blechi U. Braun, Crous & N. Pons (2002)
- Pseudocercospora blepharidis (Chidd.) U. Braun & Crous (2003)
- Pseudocercospora blumeae (Thüm.) Deighton (1976)
- Pseudocercospora blumeae-balsamiferae Sawada ex Guo & W.H. Hsieh (1987)
- Pseudocercospora blumeae-oxyodontae H.S.G. Rao & S. Narayan (1999)
- Pseudocercospora boedijniana U. Braun (2001)
- Pseudocercospora boehmeriigena U. Braun (1997)
- Pseudocercospora bolkanii Furlan. & Dianese (1999)
- Pseudocercospora bombacina (T.S. Ramakr. & K. Ramakr.) Deighton (1987)
- Pseudocercospora bomplandiana (Speg.) U. Braun (2000)
- Pseudocercospora bonducellae (Henn.) U. Braun, Dianese & A. Hern.-Gut. (2009)
- Pseudocercospora boraginis (G.P. Agarwal & N.D. Sharma) U. Braun & Crous (2003)
- Pseudocercospora boringuensis (E. Young) Deighton (1976)
- Pseudocercospora borreriae (Ellis & Everh.) Deighton (1976)
- Pseudocercospora bougainvilleae Y.L. Guo (1999)
- Pseudocercospora brachypoda (Speg.) U. Braun (2000)
- Pseudocercospora brachypus (Ellis & Everh.) Y.L. Guo & X.J. Liu (1992)
- Pseudocercospora brackenicola Guatim., R.W. Barreto & Crous (2016)
- Pseudocercospora bradburyae (E. Young) Deighton (1976)
- Pseudocercospora brasiliensis U. Braun & F.O. Freire (2004)
- Pseudocercospora brassicae U. Braun & McKenzie (1999)
- Pseudocercospora breonadiae Crous & Jol. Roux (2018)
- Pseudocercospora bretschneiderae X.J. Liu & Y.L. Guo (1992)
- Pseudocercospora brevis B. Sutton (1994)
- Pseudocercospora breyniae-rhamnoidis (Thirum. & Govindu) Deighton (1976)
- Pseudocercospora briareus (Ellis & Everh.) U. Braun & Crous (2003)
- Pseudocercospora brideliae Deighton (1976)
- Pseudocercospora brideliicola J.M. Yen, A.K. Kar & B.K. Das (1982)
- Pseudocercospora brideliigena H.S. Rao, Arch. Singh & Kamal (1996)
- Pseudocercospora broussonetiae (Chupp & Linder) Y.L. Guo & X.J. Liu (1989)
- Pseudocercospora bruceae (Petch) Y.L. Guo & X.J. Liu (1989)
- Pseudocercospora bruneiensis U. Braun & Sivap. (1999)
- Pseudocercospora buchaniana S.K. Majumdar, S. Singh ter & Anuradha ex Kamal (2010)
- Pseudocercospora buddlejae (W. Yamam.) Goh & W.H. Hsieh (1987)
- Pseudocercospora buteae Kamal, R.P. Singh & D.N. Shukla (1980)
- Pseudocercospora butleri (Syd. & P. Syd.) U. Braun (2000)
- Pseudocercospora byliana (Syd.) J.M. Yen (1980)
- Pseudocercospora byrsonimae (Maubl.) U. Braun & Mouch. (2000)
- Pseudocercospora byrsonimae-basilobae A. Hern.-Gut. & Dianese (2013)
- Pseudocercospora byrsonimae-coccolobifoliae A. Hern.-Gut. & Dianese (2013)
- Pseudocercospora byrsonimicola A. Hern.-Gut. & Dianese (2013)
- Pseudocercospora byrsonimigena A. Hern.-Gut. & Dianese (2013)

== C ==
- Pseudocercospora cadabae (Thirum. & Govindu) U. Braun (1995)
- Pseudocercospora caesalpiniae Goh & W.H. Hsieh (1989)
- Pseudocercospora caesalpinigena U. Braun (2004)
- Pseudocercospora caesalpiniicola U. Braun, Dianese & A. Hern.-Gut. (2009)
- Pseudocercospora cajanicola (Pavgi & R.A. Singh) Deighton (1987)
- Pseudocercospora cajani-flavi Y.L. Guo & X.J. Liu (1992)
- Pseudocercospora calcarata R. Kirschner (2018)
- Pseudocercospora californiae (Joanne E. Taylor & Crous) Joanne E. Taylor & Crous (2013)
- Pseudocercospora callicarpae (Cooke) Y.L. Guo & W.X. Zhao (1989)
- Pseudocercospora callicarpicola Sawada ex Goh & W.H. Hsieh (1989)
- Pseudocercospora caloloma (Petr.) U. Braun (1995)
- Pseudocercospora calopogonii (F. Stevens & Solheim) Deighton (1976)
- Pseudocercospora calospilea (Syd.) Deighton (1976)
- Pseudocercospora calycophylli U. Braun & Urtiaga (2013)
- Pseudocercospora camelliae (Deighton) U. Braun (1993)
- Pseudocercospora camelliicola U. Braun & C.F. Hill (2002)
- Pseudocercospora campanulae U. Braun & Crous (2007)
- Pseudocercospora campanumoeae Sawada ex Goh & W.H. Hsieh (1987)
- Pseudocercospora campograndensis A. Hern.-Gut. & Dianese (2013)
- Pseudocercospora camptothecae X.J. Liu & Y.L. Guo (1987)
- Pseudocercospora canarii C.F. Zhang & P.K. Chi (2000)
- Pseudocercospora canavaliigena J.M. Yen & Lim (1982)
- Pseudocercospora cannabina (Wakef.) Deighton (1976)
- Pseudocercospora capensis Crous & B. Sutton (1997)
- Pseudocercospora caperoniae (L.S. Olive) Deighton (1976)
- Pseudocercospora caprifoliacearum (C. Gupta, Abbasi & Kamal) Kamal (2010)
- Pseudocercospora careyae (T.S. Ramakr. & K. Ramakr.) R.K. Verma, M.K. Khan & Kamal (1989)
- Pseudocercospora carissae B.B. Singh & P. Mukerjee (1980)
- Pseudocercospora carolinensis (Tharp) U. Braun & Crous (2003)
- Pseudocercospora carpentariae Deighton (1987)
- Pseudocercospora carrii (Barthol.) U. Braun (1999)
- Pseudocercospora carveriana (Sacc. & D. Sacc.) Crous & M.P.S. Câmara (1999)
- Pseudocercospora caseariae (F. Stevens) U. Braun & Sivap. (1999)
- Pseudocercospora caseariae-tomentosae Kamal (2010)
- Pseudocercospora caseariigena H.S.G. Rao, S. Chandra & Kamal (1995)
- Pseudocercospora cassiae-alatae (J.M. Yen & Lim) J.M. Yen (1980)
- Pseudocercospora cassiae-diphyllae U. Braun (1989)
- Pseudocercospora cassiae-fistulae Goh & W.H. Hsieh (1990)
- Pseudocercospora cassiae-occidentalis (J.M. Yen) J.M. Yen (1981)
- Pseudocercospora cassiae-siameae (Chidd.) Deighton (1976)
- Pseudocercospora cassiae-sophorae S.K. Singh & Bhalla (2000)
- Pseudocercospora cassiigena (J.M. Yen & Lim) J.M. Yen (1980)
- Pseudocercospora castaneae U. Braun & Crous (2003)
- Pseudocercospora casuarinae Crous & R.G. Shivas (2010)
- Pseudocercospora catalpicola U. Braun (1999)
- Pseudocercospora catalpigena U. Braun & Crous (2003)
- Pseudocercospora catappae (Henn.) Y.L. Guo & X.J. Liu (1989)
- Pseudocercospora caudata (J. Kranz) U. Braun (2000)
- Pseudocercospora cavarae (Sacc. & D. Sacc.) Deighton (1976)
- Pseudocercospora ceanothi (Kellerm. & Swingle) Y.L. Guo & X.J. Liu (1989)
- Pseudocercospora cecropiae (F. Stevens) Deighton (1976)
- Pseudocercospora cecropiicola Deighton (1976)
- Pseudocercospora cecropiigena U. Braun & F.O. Freire (2003)
- Pseudocercospora cedrelae-mexicanae U. Braun & Crous (2003)
- Pseudocercospora celastri Suj. Singh (1979)
- Pseudocercospora celosiarum (A.K. Kar & M. Mandal) Deighton (1976)
- Pseudocercospora centellae Rashmi Dubey & Akh.K. Pandey (2008)
- Pseudocercospora centrosematicola (J.M. Yen & Lim) J.M. Yen (1980)
- Pseudocercospora cephalanthi Goh & W.H. Hsieh (1990)
- Pseudocercospora ceratoniae (Pat. & Trab.) Deighton (1976)
- Pseudocercospora cercidicola Crous, U. Braun & C. Nakash. (2012)
- Pseudocercospora cercidis-chinensis H.D. Shin & U. Braun (2000)
- Pseudocercospora chamaecristae U. Braun & F.O. Freire (2003)
- Pseudocercospora chamaecristigena A. Hern.-Gut. & Dianese (2009)
- Pseudocercospora chamaecyparidis (Sawada) C. Nakash. & U. Braun (2013)
- Pseudocercospora chamaesyces (F. Stevens & Dalbey) Deighton (1987)
- Pseudocercospora chamissoana R.F. Castañeda & U. Braun (1989)
- Pseudocercospora chebulae B. Sutton (1994)
- Pseudocercospora chengtuensis (F.L. Tai) Deighton (1976)
- Pseudocercospora chenopodiacearum U. Braun (2000)
- Pseudocercospora chenopodii-ambrosioidis (J.M. Yen) U. Braun & R.F. Castañeda (1989)
- Pseudocercospora chiangmaiensis Cheew., K.D. Hyde & Crous (2008)
- Pseudocercospora chibaensis Tak. Kobay. & Nagash. (1991)
- Pseudocercospora chionanthicola C. Nakash. & Tak. Kobay. (2002)
- Pseudocercospora chionanthi-retusi Goh & W.H. Hsieh (1990)
- Pseudocercospora chirguensis U. Braun, Crous & N. Pons (2003)
- Pseudocercospora chloranthi (Togashi & Katsuki) X.J. Liu & Y.L. Guo (1992)
- Pseudocercospora chlorophorae (J.M. Yen & Gilles) Deighton (1976)
- Pseudocercospora chlorophoricola (J.M. Yen & Gilles) Deighton (1979)
- Pseudocercospora chloroxyli (T.S. Ramakr. & G.S. Reddy) U. Braun, Bagyan. & Jagad. (1992)
- Pseudocercospora chloroxylicola Hosag. & R.K. Verma (1992)
- Pseudocercospora chorisiae (Tak. Kobay. & Onuki) U. Braun & Crous (2003)
- Pseudocercospora chowdhurii (A.K. Roy) R.K. Chaudhary & V.K. Pal (2007)
- Pseudocercospora christellae Phengs., McKenzie, K.D. Hyde & U. Braun (2010)
- Pseudocercospora chrysanthemicola (J.M. Yen) Deighton (1976)
- Pseudocercospora chrysobalani (Ellis & Everh.) U. Braun & Crous (2003)
- Pseudocercospora cinchonae (Ellis & Everh.) U. Braun & Crous (2003)
- Pseudocercospora cinchonicola (Boedijn) U. Braun (2001)
- Pseudocercospora cinerea (Pavgi & U.P. Singh) Deighton (1976)
- Pseudocercospora cinnamomi (Sawada & Katsuki) Goh & W.H. Hsieh (1987)
- Pseudocercospora cissi Bagyan., U. Braun & Jagad. (1992)
- Pseudocercospora citri Y.L. Guo (2001)
- Pseudocercospora cladophora Sawada ex Goh & W.H. Hsieh (1987)
- Pseudocercospora cladosporioides (Sacc.) U. Braun (1993)
- Pseudocercospora cladrastidis (Jacz.) J.K. Bai & M.Y. Cheng (1992)
- Pseudocercospora clausenae (Thirum. & Chupp) X.J. Liu & Y.L. Guo (1989)
- Pseudocercospora clavicarpa (Ellis & Everh.) U. Braun (1999)
- Pseudocercospora cleidionis Haldar & J.B. Ray (2011)
- Pseudocercospora clematidicola P.N. Singh, Kharwar & H.S.G. Rao (1997)
- Pseudocercospora clematidigena U. Braun & Crous (2005)
- Pseudocercospora clematidis-haenkeanae U. Braun & Urtiaga (2013)
- Pseudocercospora clematoclethrae X.J. Liu & Y.L. Guo (1992)
- Pseudocercospora clerodendri (I. Miyake) Deighton (1976)
- Pseudocercospora clerodendricola D.M. Macedo & R.W. Barreto (2010)
- Pseudocercospora clerodendrigena U. Braun (2002)
- Pseudocercospora clerodendri-hastati C. Nakash. (2011)
- Pseudocercospora clibadiicola U. Braun & Urtiaga (2008)
- Pseudocercospora clitoriae (G.F. Atk.) Deighton (1976)
- Pseudocercospora clusiae R. Kirschner (2018)
- Pseudocercospora clutiae (Kalchbr. & Cooke) Deighton (1976)
- Pseudocercospora clutiicola Crous & U. Braun (1994)
- Pseudocercospora cocculi (Syd.) Deighton (1976)
- Pseudocercospora cocculicola S.K. Singh & Bhalla (2000)
- Pseudocercospora cocculigena Y.L. Guo (2001)
- Pseudocercospora cochlospermi (R.E.D. Baker & W.T. Dale) U. Braun & Crous (2003)
- Pseudocercospora coffeigena Y.L. Guo & X.J. Liu (1999)
- Pseudocercospora colebrookiae H.S.G. Rao, A.S. Moses & P.N. Singh (1996)
- Pseudocercospora colebrookiae-oppositifoliae U. Braun (2009)
- Pseudocercospora colebrookiicola P.N. Singh, M.S. Tripathi, A.N. Singh bis & R.K. Chaudhary (1998)
- Pseudocercospora coleosanthi (Ellis & Everh.) U. Braun & Crous (2003)
- Pseudocercospora collinsiae (U. Braun & Rogerson) U. Braun & Crous (2002)
- Pseudocercospora colocasiae Deighton (1976)
- Pseudocercospora comandrae (Ellis & Dearn.) U. Braun & Crous (2003)
- Pseudocercospora combretacearum R.K. Verma & Kamal (1987)
- Pseudocercospora combreti A.K. Singh & Kamal (1987)
- Pseudocercospora combreticola U. Braun & F.O. Freire (2003)
- Pseudocercospora combretigena U. Braun (2001)
- Pseudocercospora commonsii (Sacc.) U. Braun & F.O. Freire (2003)
- Pseudocercospora comocladiae (Petr. & Cif.) Deighton (1976)
- Pseudocercospora conjugans (F. Stevens & Solheim) U. Braun & Crous (2003)
- Pseudocercospora conocarpi N. Pons, U. Braun & Crous (2003)
- Pseudocercospora consociata (G. Winter) Y.L. Guo & X.J. Liu (1989)
- Pseudocercospora conspicua (Earle) Deighton (1976)
- Pseudocercospora constrictoflexuosa (U. Braun) U. Braun (2014)
- Pseudocercospora contraria (Syd. & P. Syd.) Deighton (1976)
- Pseudocercospora convoluta (Crous & Den Breeÿen) U. Braun, C. Nakash., Videira & Crous (2017)
- Pseudocercospora conyzae Sawada ex Goh & W.H. Hsieh (1987)
- Pseudocercospora coperniciae U. Braun & F.O. Freire (2003)
- Pseudocercospora coprosmae U. Braun & C.F. Hill (2003)
- Pseudocercospora corchorica (Petr. & Cif.) Deighton (1976)
- Pseudocercospora corchorifoliae (Thirum. & Govindu) Deighton (1976)
- Pseudocercospora cordiae Kamal & R.P. Singh (1980)
- Pseudocercospora cordiae-alliodorae U. Braun & Urtiaga (2012)
- Pseudocercospora cordiana Crous & Bench. (2000)
- Pseudocercospora cordiicola (J.M. Yen) J.M. Yen (1980)
- Pseudocercospora cordiigena U. Braun & Urtiaga (2012)
- Pseudocercospora cordylines U. Braun (1998)
- Pseudocercospora coremioides U. Braun & Urtiaga (2013)
- Pseudocercospora cornicola (Tracy & Earle) Y.L. Guo & X.J. Liu (1989)
- Pseudocercospora correae B. Sutton & Pascoe (1987)
- Pseudocercospora correicola B. Sutton & Pascoe (1988)
- Pseudocercospora corylopsidis (Togashi & Katsuki) C. Nakash. & Tak. Kobay. (1999)
- Pseudocercospora cosmicola (A.K. Kar & M. Mandal) Deighton (1987)
- Pseudocercospora costi (F. Stevens) U. Braun & Crous (2003)
- Pseudocercospora costina (Syd. & P. Syd.) Deighton (1976)
- Pseudocercospora cotini (Katsuki & Tak. Kobay.) Deighton (1987)
- Pseudocercospora cotoneastri (Katsuki & Tak. Kobay.) Deighton (1987)
- Pseudocercospora couratari (Chupp) U. Braun & Crous (2003)
- Pseudocercospora coussapoae F.B. Rocha & R.W. Barreto (2010)
- Pseudocercospora cratevae Phengs., U. Braun, McKenzie, Chukeat., L. Cai & K.D. Hyde (2013)
- Pseudocercospora cratevicola C. Nakash. & U. Braun (2013)
- Pseudocercospora crescentiae U. Braun & Urtiaga (2012)
- Pseudocercospora crispans G.C. Hunter & Crous (2012)
- Pseudocercospora crocea Crous, U. Braun, G.C. Hunter & H.D. Shin (2012)
- Pseudocercospora crossopterygis Deighton (1983)
- Pseudocercospora crotalariana (Pavgi & U.P. Singh) Deighton (1976)
- Pseudocercospora crotalariicola (J.M. Yen) J.M. Yen (1979)
- Pseudocercospora crotalariigena A. Singh, P.N. Singh & N.K. Dubey (2021)
- Pseudocercospora crousii U. Braun & M.A. Dick (2002)
- Pseudocercospora cryptolepidis (Pandotra & Ganguly) Deighton (1976)
- Pseudocercospora cryptomeriicola (Sawada) C. Nakash., Akashi & M. Akiba (2007)
- Pseudocercospora cryptostegiae (W. Yamam.) Deighton (1976)
- Pseudocercospora cryptostegiae-madagascariensis J.L. Silva, R.W. Barreto & O.L. Pereira (2008)
- Pseudocercospora cubae Crous (1998)
- Pseudocercospora cucurbitina (Speg.) U. Braun (2000)
- Pseudocercospora cupaniae (Syd.) U. Braun & F.O. Freire (2003)
- Pseudocercospora cupheae (Syd.) U. Braun (1999)
- Pseudocercospora curculiginis Y.L. Guo & X.J. Liu (1992)
- Pseudocercospora curcumicola A. Yoshida, I. Araki & C. Nakash. (2014)
- Pseudocercospora curta (Syd.) U. Braun & Crous (2002)
- Pseudocercospora curtisiae (Chupp & Doidge) Crous & U. Braun (1996)
- Pseudocercospora cyatheae C. Nakash. & S. Inaba (2006)
- Pseudocercospora cyatheicola Crous & R.G. Shivas (2011)
- Pseudocercospora cyathulae (Syd.) U. Braun (2015)
- Pseudocercospora cybistacis (Henn.) X.J. Liu & Y.L. Guo (1989)
- Pseudocercospora cycleae (Chidd.) Deighton (1976)
- Pseudocercospora cyclosori Haldar & J.B. Ray ex R. Kirschner (2019)
- Pseudocercospora cydoniae (Ellis & Everh.) Y.L. Guo & X.J. Liu (1992)
- Pseudocercospora cylindrata (Chupp & Linder) N. Pons & B. Sutton (1988)
- Pseudocercospora cylindrosporioides (Solheim & Chupp) Y.L. Guo & X.J. Liu (1992)
- Pseudocercospora cymbidiicola U. Braun & C.F. Hill (2002)
- Pseudocercospora cynometrae Deighton (1987)
- Pseudocercospora cypripedii (Ellis & Dearn.) U. Braun & Crous (2003)

== D ==
- Pseudocercospora dalbergiae (S.H. Sun) J.M. Yen (1979)
- Pseudocercospora danaicola (Vienn.-Bourg.) Pirnia & Zare (2012)
- Pseudocercospora daphniphylli (Katsuki & Tak. Kobay.) Deighton (1987)
- Pseudocercospora daphniphyllicola U. Braun & Hönig (2015)
- Pseudocercospora daspurensis (A.K. Kar & M. Mandal) Deighton (1976)
- Pseudocercospora daturae Chidd. (1957)
- Pseudocercospora daturina (J.M. Yen) Deighton (1976)
- Pseudocercospora davalliae (A.K. Kar & M. Mandal) U. Braun & Crous (2003)
- Pseudocercospora davalliicola U. Braun (2013)
- Pseudocercospora davidiicola C. Nakash., H. Horie & Tak. Kobay. (2008)
- Pseudocercospora debregeasiae Y.L. Guo (2013)
- Pseudocercospora decumariae (Tracy & Earle) U. Braun & Crous (2003)
- Pseudocercospora deglupta Crous (1998)
- Pseudocercospora deightonii Minter (1980)
- Pseudocercospora deinbolliae Deighton (1976)
- Pseudocercospora delonicis (J.M. Yen) J.M. Yen (1980)
- Pseudocercospora dendrobii Goh & W.H. Hsieh (1990)
- Pseudocercospora denticulata Crous (1998)
- Pseudocercospora depazeoides (Desm.) U. Braun & Crous (2015)
- Pseudocercospora desmodiicola (B. Rai & Kamal) U. Braun & Crous (2003)
- Pseudocercospora desmodii-salicifolii Deighton (1987)
- Pseudocercospora destructiva (Ravenel) Y.L. Guo & X.J. Liu (1992)
- Pseudocercospora dianellae U. Braun & C.F. Hill (2003)
- Pseudocercospora dichrocephalae (W. Yamam.) Goh & W.H. Hsieh (1987)
- Pseudocercospora diclipterae (A.K. Kar & M. Mandal) Deighton (1987)
- Pseudocercospora dictamni (Fuckel) U. Braun & Crous (2002)
- Pseudocercospora didymochetonis (Wakef.) Y.L. Guo (1999)
- Pseudocercospora didymospora (Ellis & Barthol.) U. Braun & Crous (2003)
- Pseudocercospora diervillae (Ellis & Everh.) U. Braun (1996)
- Pseudocercospora dilleniae (Petch) Sarbajna (1989)
- Pseudocercospora dimorphandrae Marg. Silva & R.W. Barreto (2016)
- Pseudocercospora dingleyae U. Braun & C.F. Hill (2002)
- Pseudocercospora dioscoreae U. Braun, Mouch. & McKenzie (1999)
- Pseudocercospora diospyricola Goh & W.H. Hsieh (1990)
- Pseudocercospora diospyri-erianthae Sawada ex Goh & W.H. Hsieh (1987)
- Pseudocercospora diospyri-japonicae U. Braun (2020)
- Pseudocercospora diospyri-lycioides Crous & U. Braun (1995)
- Pseudocercospora diospyri-morrisianae Sawada ex Goh & W.H. Hsieh (1987)
- Pseudocercospora diospyriphila H.D. Shin & U. Braun (2020)
- Pseudocercospora diplusodonis Meir. Silva, R.W. Barreto & Crous (2016)
- Pseudocercospora dipterocarpacearum U. Braun (2000)
- Pseudocercospora dispori (U. Braun) U. Braun (2014)
- Pseudocercospora dissotidis (Chupp & Doidge) Crous & U. Braun (1996)
- Pseudocercospora diversispora Goh & W.H. Hsieh (1989)
- Pseudocercospora dodonaeae Boesew. (1981)
- Pseudocercospora doemiae (A.K. Kar & M. Mandal) Deighton (1979)
- Pseudocercospora doidgeae Crous & U. Braun (1996)
- Pseudocercospora dolichandrones (Chupp) Deighton (1976)
- Pseudocercospora dolichi (Ellis & Everh.) J.M. Yen (1981)
- Pseudocercospora doliocarpi U. Braun & R.F. Castañeda (1991)
- Pseudocercospora domingensis (Petr. & Cif.) Quaedvl., Verkley & Crous (2013)
- Pseudocercospora dominicana (Cif. & Gonz. Frag.) U. Braun (1995)
- Pseudocercospora donacicola Rita Singh & Abbasi (2002)
- Pseudocercospora dovyalidis (Chupp & Doidge) Deighton (1976)
- Pseudocercospora dracunculi (Sarwar) Y.L. Guo (1996)
- Pseudocercospora duabangae M.D. Mehrotra & R.K. Verma (1991)
- Pseudocercospora durantae N. Pons, U. Braun & Crous (2003)
- Pseudocercospora dypsidis Y.J. Chen, Jayaward. & K.D. Hyde (2020)

== E ==
- Pseudocercospora ebulicola (W. Yamam.) Deighton (1976)
- Pseudocercospora ecbolii (A.K. Kar & M. Mandal) Deighton (1987)
- Pseudocercospora ecdysantherae (J.M. Yen) J.M. Yen (1981)
- Pseudocercospora egenula (Syd.) U. Braun & Crous (2003)
- Pseudocercospora ehretiae Sawada ex Goh & W.H. Hsieh (1989)
- Pseudocercospora ehretiae-thyrsiflorae Goh & W.H. Hsieh (1989)
- Pseudocercospora ekebergiae (Crous & B. Sutton) U. Braun & Crous (2002)
- Pseudocercospora elaeagnicola (Chidd.) Deighton (1987)
- Pseudocercospora elaeocarpi B. Sutton & Sankaran (1994)
- Pseudocercospora elaeocarpicola Tak. Kobay., Nishij. & C. Nakash. (1998)
- Pseudocercospora elaeodendri (G.P. Agarwal & Hasija) Deighton (1976)
- Pseudocercospora elephantopodicola (J.M. Yen & Gilles) U. Braun & F.O. Freire (2006)
- Pseudocercospora elephantopodis (Ellis & Everh.) R.F. Castañeda & U. Braun (1989)
- Pseudocercospora embeliicola C.D. Sharma, Gadp., A.N. Rai & K.M. Vyas (1996)
- Pseudocercospora emmoticola Meir. Silva, R.W. Barreto & Crous (2016)
- Pseudocercospora encephalarti Y. Meswaet, Mangelsdorff, Yorou & M. Piepenbr. (2019)
- Pseudocercospora entebbeensis (Deighton) Deighton (1976)
- Pseudocercospora epidendri Meir. Silva & O.L. Pereira (2011)
- Pseudocercospora epigaeae (Ellis & Dearn.) U. Braun & Crous (2003)
- Pseudocercospora epispermogoniana Crous & M.J. Wingf. (1996)
- Pseudocercospora eriobotryae (Enjoji) Goh & W.H. Hsieh (1987)
- Pseudocercospora eriobotryicola (J.M. Yen) J.M. Yen (1979)
- Pseudocercospora eriodendri (Racib.) U. Braun (1992)
- Pseudocercospora eriothecae A. Hern.-Gut. & Dianese (2009)
- Pseudocercospora ershadii M. Bakhshi, U. Braun & Zare (2020)
- Pseudocercospora ervatamiae (J.M. Yen & Lim) J.M. Yen (1980)
- Pseudocercospora erythrinicola U. Braun & Urtiaga (2013)
- Pseudocercospora erythrinigena J.M. Yen (1979)
- Pseudocercospora erythrogena (G.F. Atk.) U. Braun (1999)
- Pseudocercospora erythrophlei Z.Q. Yuan (1996)
- Pseudocercospora erythroxyli (Govindu & Thirum.) U. Braun, Bagyan. & Jagad. (1992)
- Pseudocercospora erythroxylicola U. Braun & Urtiaga (2013)
- Pseudocercospora escalloniae (Marchion.) U. Braun & C.F. Hill (2008)
- Pseudocercospora eucalypticola S.K. Singh & Bhalla (2000)
- Pseudocercospora eucalyptigena U. Braun (2001)
- Pseudocercospora eucalyptorum Crous, M.J. Wingf., Marasas & B. Sutton (1989)
- Pseudocercospora eucleae Crous & B. Sutton (1997)
- Pseudocercospora eucommiae Y.L. Guo & X.J. Liu (1987)
- Pseudocercospora eugeniicola U. Braun, J.C. David & F.O. Freire (1999)
- Pseudocercospora eumusae Crous & Mour. (2002)
- Pseudocercospora euodiicola (Boedijn) U. Braun (2001)
- Pseudocercospora euonymi-japonici Y. Zhang ter & Q. Wang (2019)
- Pseudocercospora eupatoriella Crous & Den Breeÿen (2006)
- Pseudocercospora eupatorii (Peck) U. Braun & R.F. Castañeda (1991)
- Pseudocercospora eupatoriicola (Govindu & Thirum.) A.Z.M. Khan & Shamsi (1983)
- Pseudocercospora eupatorii-formosani U. Braun & Bagyan. (1999)
- Pseudocercospora euphorbiacearum U. Braun (2003)
- Pseudocercospora euphorbiae-piluliferae J.M. Yen, A.K. Kar & B.K. Das (1982)
- Pseudocercospora euphorbiae-pubescentis (Unamuno) U. Braun & Crous (2003)
- Pseudocercospora euphorbiicola (G.F. Atk.) U. Braun & Crous (2003)
- Pseudocercospora euryae Y.L. Guo (1999)
- Pseudocercospora evolvuli (Chupp) U. Braun & Crous (2003)
- Pseudocercospora exilis A. Hern.-Gut. & Dianese (2009)
- Pseudocercospora exochordae (Chupp & J.A. Stev.) Deighton (1987)

== F ==
- Pseudocercospora fabacearum (M.K. Khan, R.K. Verma & Kamal) Kamal (2010)
- Pseudocercospora fagarae (W. Yamam.) Deighton (1976)
- Pseudocercospora fagaricola Sawada ex Goh & W.H. Hsieh (1990)
- Pseudocercospora fasciculata (Speg.) Deighton (1976)
- Pseudocercospora fatouae Goh & W.H. Hsieh (1990)
- Pseudocercospora feigeana U. Braun (2003)
- Pseudocercospora feijoae El-Gholl & T.S. Schub. (1989)
- Pseudocercospora fengshanensis (T.Y. Lin & J.M. Yen) J.M. Yen & S.K. Sun (1983)
- Pseudocercospora fici (Heald & F.A. Wolf) X.J. Liu & Y.L. Guo (1991)
- Pseudocercospora fici-caricae (Sawada) Goh & W.H. Hsieh (1990)
- Pseudocercospora fici-chartaceae (J.M. Yen & Lim) J.M. Yen (1980)
- Pseudocercospora ficicola H.S.G. Rao, S. Chandra & Kamal (1995)
- Pseudocercospora ficigena U. Braun (2000)
- Pseudocercospora fici-hispidae Kamal (2010)
- Pseudocercospora fici-microcarpae R. Kirschner (2014)
- Pseudocercospora ficina U. Braun (2003)
- Pseudocercospora fici-religiosae (Chidd.) U. Braun, Bagyan. & Jagad. (1992)
- Pseudocercospora fici-septicae Sawada ex Goh & W.H. Hsieh (1987)
- Pseudocercospora fici-sycamori Crous & U. Braun (1996)
- Pseudocercospora fijiensis (M. Morelet) Deighton (1976)
- Pseudocercospora filiformis (Davis) J.K. Bai & M.Y. Cheng (1992)
- Pseudocercospora filipendulae-ulmariae U. Braun & C.F. Hill (2004)
- Pseudocercospora firmianae Y.L. Guo (2018)
- Pseudocercospora firmianicola Y.L. Guo (2018)
- Pseudocercospora flacourtiicola U. Braun & Kamal (2003)
- Pseudocercospora flagellariae Sawada ex Goh & W.H. Hsieh (1987)
- Pseudocercospora flavomarginata G.C. Hunter, Crous & M.J. Wingf. (2006)
- Pseudocercospora flemingiae (S.M. Singh) U. Braun & Crous (2003)
- Pseudocercospora flemingiae-macrophyllae U. Braun & Crous (2003)
- Pseudocercospora forestierae (E. West) U. Braun & Crous (2005)
- Pseudocercospora fori (G.C. Hunter, Crous & M.J. Wingf.) G.C. Hunter, Crous & M.J. Wingf. (2009)
- Pseudocercospora formosana (W. Yamam.) Deighton (1976)
- Pseudocercospora forrestiae Sawada ex Goh & W.H. Hsieh (1987)
- Pseudocercospora forsythiae (Katsuki & Tak. Kobay.) Deighton (1987)
- Pseudocercospora fothergillae Tak. Kobay., Ogawa & Nagash. (1991)
- Pseudocercospora fragarina (Q.Z. Huang & P.K. Chi) P.K. Chi (2000)
- Pseudocercospora fraserae (Ellis & Everh.) U. Braun (1993)
- Pseudocercospora fraxinites (Ellis & Everh.) Y.L. Guo & X.J. Liu (1992)
- Pseudocercospora froelichiae U. Braun & F.O. Freire (2004)
- Pseudocercospora fudinga T.Z. Huang & Ze Yu Chen (1989)
- Pseudocercospora fukuii (W. Yamam.) Goh & W.H. Hsieh (1987)
- Pseudocercospora fukuokaensis (Chupp) X.J. Liu & Y.L. Guo (1992)
- Pseudocercospora fuligena (Roldan) Deighton (1976)
- Pseudocercospora fumosa (Speg.) U. Braun (2000)

== G ==
- Pseudocercospora gangetici (Bharadwaj) U. Braun (1999)
- Pseudocercospora gardeniae (Boedijn) Deighton (1976)
- Pseudocercospora garhwalensis S.L. Srivast. & Topal (1985)
- Pseudocercospora garryae (Harkn.) U. Braun & Crous (2005)
- Pseudocercospora gaultheriae (Ellis & Everh.) U. Braun & Crous (2003)
- Pseudocercospora gaurae (Kellerm. & Swingle) U. Braun & Crous (2003)
- Pseudocercospora gei (Fuckel) Y.L. Guo & X.J. Liu (1987)
- Pseudocercospora geicola U. Braun (1991)
- Pseudocercospora gelsemiicola U. Braun & Crous (2003)
- Pseudocercospora genipicola U. Braun & F.O. Freire (2003)
- Pseudocercospora gentianacearum H.S. Rao, A.S. Moses & P.N. Singh (1996)
- Pseudocercospora gentianicola (Ellis & Everh.) U. Braun & Crous (2003)
- Pseudocercospora geraniacearum U. Braun & Rogerson (1993)
- Pseudocercospora geraniicola U. Braun (1993)
- Pseudocercospora getoniae Phengs., Chukeat., McKenzie, K.D. Hyde & U. Braun (2013)
- Pseudocercospora ghanensis Deighton (1976)
- Pseudocercospora ghissambilae U. Braun & Crous (2003)
- Pseudocercospora ginkgoana R. Kirschner (2018)
- Pseudocercospora giranensis Sawada ex Goh & W.H. Hsieh (1987)
- Pseudocercospora glauca (Syd.) Y.L. Guo & X.J. Liu (1992)
- Pseudocercospora glaucescens (G. Winter) U. Braun (1999)
- Pseudocercospora gleicheniae (J.M. Yen) U. Braun (2013)
- Pseudocercospora globosae (J.M. Yen) Deighton (1976)
- Pseudocercospora glochidii (Sawada) Goh & W.H. Hsieh (1987)
- Pseudocercospora glomerata (Harkn.) U. Braun & Crous (2003)
- Pseudocercospora glycines (Cooke) Deighton (1976)
- Pseudocercospora glycosmidis (M. Mandal) U. Braun & Crous (2003)
- Pseudocercospora gomphrenae Sawada ex Goh & W.H. Hsieh (1989)
- Pseudocercospora gomphrenae-pulchellae U. Braun, Delhey & Kiehr (2001)
- Pseudocercospora gomphrenicola Chidd. (1957)
- Pseudocercospora gonolobicola U. Braun & Urtiaga (2012)
- Pseudocercospora gorakhpurensis H.S.G. Rao, S. Chandra & Kamal (1995)
- Pseudocercospora gracilenta (Syd.) Deighton (1976)
- Pseudocercospora gracilis Crous & Alfenas (1995)
- Pseudocercospora grajauensis A. Hern.-Gut. & Dianese (2013)
- Pseudocercospora greenei Deighton (1976)
- Pseudocercospora grewiicola (Govindu & Thirum.) Bagyan., U. Braun & Jagad. (1995)
- Pseudocercospora grewiigena Y.L. Guo (1995)
- Pseudocercospora grindeliae U. Braun, Delhey & Kiehr (2001)
- Pseudocercospora grisea (Cooke & Ellis) U. Braun (1999)
- Pseudocercospora griseola (Sacc.) Crous & U. Braun (2006)
- Pseudocercospora grossulariacearum U. Braun & Crous (2003)
- Pseudocercospora guanarensis U. Braun & Urtiaga (2013)
- Pseudocercospora guanicensis (E. Young) U. Braun & Crous (2003)
- Pseudocercospora guazumae (Syd.) Deighton (1976)
- Pseudocercospora guettardae (Chupp) Deighton (1976)
- Pseudocercospora guianensis (F. Stevens & Solheim) Deighton (1976)
- Pseudocercospora gunnerae U. Braun & C.F. Hill (2006)
- Pseudocercospora guttulata (Ellis & Kellerm.) U. Braun & Crous (2003)
- Pseudocercospora gymnanthis (Chupp) U. Braun & Crous (2003)
- Pseudocercospora gymnematis P. Kumar & Kamal (1979)
- Pseudocercospora gymnopetali Sawada ex Goh & W.H. Hsieh (1987)
- Pseudocercospora gymnosporiae R.K. Dubey, Firdousi, A.N. Rai & K.M. Vyas (1990)
- Pseudocercospora gyrocarpi (Karan & J.L. Mulder) U. Braun (1994)

== H ==
- Pseudocercospora hachijokibushi C. Nakash., H. Horie & Tak. Kobay. (2004)
- Pseudocercospora haiweiensis Crous & X. Zhou (2012)
- Pseudocercospora hakeae (U. Braun & Crous) U. Braun & Crous (2012)
- Pseudocercospora haldibariensis (A.K. Kar & M. Mandal) U. Braun (2001)
- Pseudocercospora haldinae Sanjay Yadav, Sanjeet Verma & Raghv. Singh (2021)
- Pseudocercospora halleriae (Chupp & Doidge) Deighton (1976)
- Pseudocercospora haloragis (Hansf.) U. Braun (1995)
- Pseudocercospora hamiltoniani Raghvendra Singh, Sanjeet Kumar Verma, Sanjay Yadav, Puja Bhojak & Shambhu Kumar (2020)
- Pseudocercospora hangzhouensis X.J. Liu & Y.L. Guo (1987)
- Pseudocercospora hansfordii (Chupp) Deighton (1987)
- Pseudocercospora haplophragmatis (Kamal & R.P. Singh) U. Braun (2000)
- Pseudocercospora hardwarensis (Naras.) U. Braun & Crous (2003)
- Pseudocercospora harunganae Deighton (1987)
- Pseudocercospora hebeicola U. Braun & C.F. Hill (2004)
- Pseudocercospora hedychii (Boedijn) U. Braun (2001)
- Pseudocercospora hedyosmi (Petr.) U. Braun (1995)
- Pseudocercospora hedyotidis (Suj. Singh) B. Sutton (1994)
- Pseudocercospora heliconiae Meir. Silva & O.L. Pereira (2010)
- Pseudocercospora helicteris U. Braun & Urtiaga (2013)
- Pseudocercospora heliotropii U. Braun & F.O. Freire (2003)
- Pseudocercospora helleri (Earle) Deighton (1976)
- Pseudocercospora helminthostachydis (Henn.) Deighton (1976)
- Pseudocercospora hemidesmi (A.K. Kar & M. Mandal) Deighton (1987)
- Pseudocercospora hemidiodiae (Toro) Deighton (1976)
- Pseudocercospora herpestica (Petr. & Cif.) U. Braun (2001)
- Pseudocercospora heteromalla (Syd.) Deighton (1987)
- Pseudocercospora heteromelis (Harkn.) U. Braun & Crous (2002)
- Pseudocercospora heteropyxidicola Crous (2019)
- Pseudocercospora heterospermi Budathoki & S.K. Singh (1995)
- Pseudocercospora heveae (Vincens) Deighton (1976)
- Pseudocercospora hibbertiae-asperae Beilharz & Cunningt. (2003)
- Pseudocercospora hibisci-cannabini (Sawada) Deighton (1976)
- Pseudocercospora hibiscigena P.N. Singh, S.K. Singh & S.C. Tripathi (1996)
- Pseudocercospora hibisci-mutabilis (S.H. Sun) J.M. Yen (1981)
- Pseudocercospora hibiscina (Ellis & Everh.) Y.L. Guo & X.J. Liu (1989)
- Pseudocercospora hieracii (Ellis & Everh.) U. Braun & Crous (2003)
- Pseudocercospora hieronymae (Chupp) U. Braun & Crous (2003)
- Pseudocercospora hilliana U. Braun (2010)
- Pseudocercospora himalayana Budathoki & S.K. Singh (1995)
- Pseudocercospora hiptages (Petch) U. Braun & Crous (2003)
- Pseudocercospora hiratsukana (Togashi & Katsuki) Deighton (1976)
- Pseudocercospora hirtellae U. Braun, J.C. David & F.O. Freire (1999)
- Pseudocercospora holarrhenae (Thirum. & Chupp) Deighton (1976)
- Pseudocercospora holmskioldiae C. Nakash. & Meeboon (2007)
- Pseudocercospora holopteleae (Chidd.) U. Braun & Crous (2003)
- Pseudocercospora homalanthi Deighton (1987)
- Pseudocercospora hopetounensis Beilharz & Pascoe (2002)
- Pseudocercospora horii C. Nakash. & Tak. Kobay. (2002)
- Pseudocercospora houstoniae (Ellis & Everh.) U. Braun & Crous (2003)
- Pseudocercospora houttuyniae (Togashi & Katsuki) Y.L. Guo & W.X. Zhao (1989)
- Pseudocercospora hoveae (Syd. & P. Syd.) K. Schub. & U. Braun (2005)
- Pseudocercospora humuli (Hori) Y.L. Guo & X.J. Liu (1987)
- Pseudocercospora humulicola Crous, U. Braun & H.D. Shin (2012)
- Pseudocercospora humuli-japonici Sawada ex Goh & W.H. Hsieh (1990)
- Pseudocercospora hunanensis Y.L. Guo (2016)
- Pseudocercospora hurae (F. Stevens) Deighton (1976)
- Pseudocercospora hybanthi U. Braun & F.O. Freire (2004)
- Pseudocercospora hydrangeae-angustipetalae Goh & W.H. Hsieh (1989)
- Pseudocercospora hymenaeae R. Kirschner & U. Braun (2006)
- Pseudocercospora hymenocardiae Deighton (1987)
- Pseudocercospora hypsophila (Syd.) U. Braun & F.O. Freire (2003)

== I ==
- Pseudocercospora ichnocarpi (A.K. Kar & M. Mandal) Deighton (1987)
- Pseudocercospora ichthyomethiae (Dearn. & Barthol.) U. Braun & Crous (2003)
- Pseudocercospora ilicis (Ellis) U. Braun (2003)
- Pseudocercospora ilicis-micrococcae Sawada ex Goh & W.H. Hsieh (1987)
- Pseudocercospora imazekii Tak. Kobay. & Nagash. (1991)
- Pseudocercospora indica D. Gupta, Padhi & Chowdhry (1982)
- Pseudocercospora indohimalayana Kamal (2010)
- Pseudocercospora indonesiana Arzanlou & Crous (2008)
- Pseudocercospora infuscans (Ellis & Everh.) U. Braun (1998)
- Pseudocercospora insueta (Petr.) Deighton (1976)
- Pseudocercospora insularis Alcorn (1978)
- Pseudocercospora inulae Y.L. Guo & Y. Jiang (2000)
- Pseudocercospora ipomoeae-purpureae (J.M. Yen) J.M. Yen (1980)
- Pseudocercospora irregularis Crous (1998)
- Pseudocercospora isorae R.K. Verma & N. Sharma (2008)
- Pseudocercospora iteae (Sawada & Katsuki) Goh & W.H. Hsieh (1987)
- Pseudocercospora iwakiensis C. Nakash., Shibayama & Motohashi (2016)
- Pseudocercospora ixorae (Solheim) Deighton (1976)
- Pseudocercospora ixorana (J.M. Yen & Lim) U. Braun & Crous (2003)
- Pseudocercospora ixoricola (J.M. Yen) J.M. Yen (1980)
- Pseudocercospora izuohshimensis C. Nakash., H. Horie & Tak. Kobay. (2004)

== J ==
- Pseudocercospora jacquemontiae U. Braun & F.O. Freire (2004)
- Pseudocercospora jagerae R.G. Shivas, Marney & Y.P. Tan (2014)
- Pseudocercospora jahnii (Syd.) U. Braun & Crous (2003)
- Pseudocercospora jamaicensis (Chupp) Deighton (1976)
- Pseudocercospora jasminicola A.S. Mull. & Chupp ex Deighton (1976)
- Pseudocercospora jatrophae (G.F. Atk.) A.K. Das & Chattopadh. (1990)
- Pseudocercospora jatrophae-curcas (J.M. Yen) Deighton (1976)
- Pseudocercospora jatropharum (Speg.) U. Braun (2000)
- Pseudocercospora javanica Deighton (1983)
- Pseudocercospora juglandicola Y.L. Guo (1999)
- Pseudocercospora juglandis (Kellerm. & Swingle) U. Braun & Crous (2003)
- Pseudocercospora jujubae (S. Chowdhury) A.Z.M. Khan & Shamsi (1983)
- Pseudocercospora juniperi (Ellis & Everh.) B. Sutton & Hodges (1990)
- Pseudocercospora jussiaeae (G.F. Atk.) Deighton (1976)
- Pseudocercospora jussiaeae-repentis (Sawada) Goh & W.H. Hsieh (1987)
- Pseudocercospora justiciae (F.L. Tai) Y.L. Guo & X.J. Liu (1991)
- Pseudocercospora justiciicola P.N. Singh, S.K. Singh & S.C. Tripathi (1996)

== K ==
- Pseudocercospora kadsurae (Togashi & Katsuki) Y.L. Guo & X.J. Liu (1992)
- Pseudocercospora kaiseri M.D. Mehrotra (1991)
- Pseudocercospora kaki Goh & W.H. Hsieh (1990)
- Pseudocercospora kakiicola C. Nakash. (2020)
- Pseudocercospora kakiigena U. Braun (2020)
- Pseudocercospora kallarensis (T.S. Ramakr. & K. Ramakr.) Y.L. Guo & X.J. Liu (1992)
- Pseudocercospora kalmiae (Ellis & Everh.) U. Braun (1996)
- Pseudocercospora kamalii Rajeshk., Rah. Sharma & S.K. Singh (2011)
- Pseudocercospora karaka (G.F. Laundon) Deighton (1976)
- Pseudocercospora kashotoensis (W. Yamam.) Deighton (1976)
- Pseudocercospora katongensis (J.M. Yen) J.M. Yen (1980)
- Pseudocercospora kenemensis Deighton (1976)
- Pseudocercospora kennediae (Cooke & Massee) U. Braun (1996)
- Pseudocercospora kennediicola Beilharz, Pascoe & Parbery (2002)
- Pseudocercospora khasiana B.K. Gupta & Kamal (1987)
- Pseudocercospora kiagweensis Deighton (1976)
- Pseudocercospora kigeziensis (Ebbels & Deighton) Deighton (1976)
- Pseudocercospora kiggelariae (Syd.) Crous & U. Braun (1994)
- Pseudocercospora kirganeliae (Thirum. & Govindu) Deighton (1976)
- Pseudocercospora kirishimensis (Naito) C. Nakash. & Tak. Kobay. (2000)
- Pseudocercospora kleinhoviae (Höhn.) Deighton (1976)
- Pseudocercospora kobayashiana C. Nakash. (2020)
- Pseudocercospora kolanensis S.K. Singh & Bhalla (2000)
- Pseudocercospora krameriae U. Braun, J.C. David & F.O. Freire (1999)
- Pseudocercospora kurimensis (Fukui) U. Braun (1996)
- Pseudocercospora kydiae A.K. Singh & Kamal (1987)

== L ==
- Pseudocercospora laburni (W.W. Ray) Deighton (1987)
- Pseudocercospora lagerstroemiae (R.C. Rajak, Soni & G.P. Pathak) Kamal (2010)
- Pseudocercospora lagerstroemiae-lanceolatae U. Braun & Crous (2003)
- Pseudocercospora lagerstroemiae-parviflorae H.S.G. Rao, S. Narayan & Bhartiya (1996)
- Pseudocercospora lagerstroemiae-subcostatae (Sawada) Goh & W.H. Hsieh (1990)
- Pseudocercospora lagerstroemiigena Goh & W.H. Hsieh (1990)
- Pseudocercospora lamiacearum H.S.G. Rao, A.S. Moses & S. Narayan (1996)
- Pseudocercospora latens (Ellis & Everh.) Y.L. Guo & X.J. Liu (1989)
- Pseudocercospora lathyri (Dearn. & House) Y.L. Guo & X.J. Liu (1992)
- Pseudocercospora launaeae (K.L. Kothari, M.K. Bhatn. & N.S. Bhatt) U. Braun & Crous (2003)
- Pseudocercospora lauracearum H.S.G. Rao, A.S. Moses & S. Narayan (1996)
- Pseudocercospora laxipes U. Braun & Crous (2003)
- Pseudocercospora leandrae (Syd.) U. Braun (1999)
- Pseudocercospora leandrae-fragilis O.L. Pereira & Meir. Silva (2017)
- Pseudocercospora lecheae (Chupp & H.C. Greene) U. Braun & Crous (2003)
- Pseudocercospora lecythidacearum C.D. Sharma, Gadp., A.N. Rai & K.M. Vyas (1996)
- Pseudocercospora leeae-macrophyllae (A.K. Kar & M. Mandal) Sarbajna (1989)
- Pseudocercospora leguminum (Chupp & Linder) Deighton (1976)
- Pseudocercospora leonensis (Deighton) Deighton (1976)
- Pseudocercospora lepidagathidis U. Braun & Crous (2005)
- Pseudocercospora lespedezicola Goh & W.H. Hsieh (1990)
- Pseudocercospora leucadendri (Cooke) U. Braun & Crous (2012)
- Pseudocercospora leucadis (Uppal, Patel & V.P. Bhide) U. Braun (1992)
- Pseudocercospora leucaenicola Raghu Ram & Mallaiah (1993)
- Pseudocercospora leucothoes (B.H. Davis) Deighton (1987)
- Pseudocercospora libertiae U. Braun & C.F. Hill (2003)
- Pseudocercospora licaniae U. Braun & Urtiaga (2008)
- Pseudocercospora lichenum (Keissl.) D. Hawksw. (1979)
- Pseudocercospora ligustri Deighton (1976)
- Pseudocercospora lilacis (Desm.) Deighton (1987)
- Pseudocercospora linariae (Chidd.) U. Braun & Crous (2003)
- Pseudocercospora lindenbergiae P.N. Singh, M.S. Tripathi, A.N. Singh bis & R.K. Chaudhary (1998)
- Pseudocercospora lini (Ellis & Everh.) U. Braun (1997)
- Pseudocercospora linnaeae U. Braun & Melnik (1995)
- Pseudocercospora lippiae-albae U. Braun & R.F. Castañeda (1989)
- Pseudocercospora liquidambaricola (J.M. Yen) U. Braun (2000)
- Pseudocercospora liquidambaris Sawada ex Goh & W.H. Hsieh (1990)
- Pseudocercospora litseae (A.N. Rai, B. Rai & Kamal) U. Braun (1995)
- Pseudocercospora litseae-cubebae Y.L. Guo (1991)
- Pseudocercospora litseicola (Boedijn) Y.L. Guo & X.J. Liu (1992)
- Pseudocercospora litseigena U. Braun (2000)
- Pseudocercospora lonchitidis (Chupp) U. Braun & Crous (2003)
- Pseudocercospora lonchocarpi (J.A. Stev.) Crous & M.P.S. Câmara (1998)
- Pseudocercospora lonchocarpicola U. Braun & Urtiaga (2013)
- Pseudocercospora lonchocarpigena U. Braun & Urtiaga (2013)
- Pseudocercospora longispora Arzanlou & Crous (2008)
- Pseudocercospora lonicerae Y.L. Guo (1995)
- Pseudocercospora lonicericola (W. Yamam.) Deighton (1976)
- Pseudocercospora lonicerigena U. Braun & Crous (2007)
- Pseudocercospora lophostemonicola U. Braun (2013)
- Pseudocercospora luculiae (M.K. Khan, Budathoki & Kamal) D.E. Shaw & Alcorn (1993)
- Pseudocercospora ludwigiana G. Bagyan, U. Braun & P. Jagad. (1995)
- Pseudocercospora lueheae U. Braun & F.O. Freire (2006)
- Pseudocercospora luetzelburgiae U. Braun & F.O. Freire (2003)
- Pseudocercospora lupini (Cooke) Deighton (1976)
- Pseudocercospora luxurians (A.K. Kar & M. Mandal) Deighton (1976)
- Pseudocercospora luzardii Furlan. & Dianese (1999)
- Pseudocercospora luzianiensis A. Hern.-Gut. & Dianese (2009)
- Pseudocercospora lyciicola (J.M. Yen) J.M. Yen (1980)
- Pseudocercospora lycopodis (Ellis & Everh.) Deighton (1976)
- Pseudocercospora lygodiicola Y.L. Guo & U. Braun (2013)
- Pseudocercospora lygodiigena U. Braun (2013)
- Pseudocercospora lyoniae (Katsuki & Tak. Kobay.) Deighton (1987)
- Pseudocercospora lysidices Y.L. Guo & F.Y. Zhai (2017)
- Pseudocercospora lysimachiae (Ellis & Halst.) Deighton (1976)
- Pseudocercospora lythracearum (Heald & F.A. Wolf) X.J. Liu & Y.L. Guo (1992)
- Pseudocercospora lythri H.D. Shin & U. Braun (2000)

== M ==
- Pseudocercospora macadamiae Beilharz, Mayers & Pascoe (2003)
- Pseudocercospora macarangae (Syd. & P. Syd.) Deighton (1976)
- Pseudocercospora macarangicola Deighton (1976)
- Pseudocercospora macclatchieana (Sacc. & P. Syd.) U. Braun & Crous (2003)
- Pseudocercospora machili Sawada ex Goh & W.H. Hsieh (1987)
- Pseudocercospora macleayae Y.L. Guo & X.J. Liu (1992)
- Pseudocercospora maclurae (Thüm.) Morgan-Jones & R.A. Phelps (1996)
- Pseudocercospora macrospora (Bat. & Peres) Crous & Bench. (2000)
- Pseudocercospora macutensis (Syd.) Deighton (1976)
- Pseudocercospora madagascariensis Crous & M.J. Wingf. (2009)
- Pseudocercospora maesae (Hansf.) X.J. Liu & Y.L. Guo (1992)
- Pseudocercospora maetaengensis J.F. Li & R. Phookamsak (2020)
- Pseudocercospora maianthemi R. Kirschner (2008)
- Pseudocercospora mali (Ellis & Everh.) Deighton (1976)
- Pseudocercospora malloti (Kharwar, P.N. Singh & R.K. Chaudhary) U. Braun (2009)
- Pseudocercospora malloticola Goh & W.H. Hsieh (1990)
- Pseudocercospora malloti-repandi (Bhalla, S.K. Singh & A.K. Srivast.) U. Braun (2000)
- Pseudocercospora malvastricola P.N. Singh, M.S. Tripathi, A.N. Singh bis & R.K. Chaudhary (1998)
- Pseudocercospora malvaviscina P.N. Singh, M.S. Tripathi, A.N. Singh bis & R.K. Chaudhary (1998)
- Pseudocercospora mamaonis (Viégas & Chupp) Tak. Kobay. & Tokash. (1995)
- Pseudocercospora mangifericola R.G. Shivas, A.J. Young & Grice (2009)
- Pseudocercospora manihotis Meir. Silva, R.W. Barreto & Crous (2016)
- Pseudocercospora manilkarae Kamal, M.K. Khan & R.K. Verma (1990)
- Pseudocercospora mannanorensis Bagyan., U. Braun & Jagad. (1995)
- Pseudocercospora manuensis Matsush. (1993)
- Pseudocercospora mapelanensis J.A. Osorio & Jol. Roux (2015)
- Pseudocercospora maracasensis (R.E.D. Baker & W.T. Dale) Deighton (1976)
- Pseudocercospora marcelliana (Chupp) U. Braun & Crous (2003)
- Pseudocercospora marginalis G.C. Hunter, Crous, U. Braun & H.D. Shin (2012)
- Pseudocercospora marsdeniae (Hansf.) Deighton (1976)
- Pseudocercospora marsdeniicola (A.K. Kar & M. Mandal) Deighton (1976)
- Pseudocercospora marsdeniigena U. Braun & F.O. Freire (2006)
- Pseudocercospora mate (Speg.) Y.L. Guo & W.X. Zhao (1989)
- Pseudocercospora matogrossoensis A. Hern.-Gut. & Dianese (2013)
- Pseudocercospora maughaniae (Suj. Singh) U. Braun & Crous (2003)
- Pseudocercospora mazandaranensis Bakhshi, Arzanlou, Babai-ahari & Crous (2014)
- Pseudocercospora mecardoniicola Kamal (2010)
- Pseudocercospora medicaginicola Deighton (1976)
- Pseudocercospora megalopotamica (Speg.) U. Braun (2000)
- Pseudocercospora meibomiae (Chupp) Deighton (1976)
- Pseudocercospora melaena (Syd.) Deighton (1976)
- Pseudocercospora melanolepidis Sawada ex Goh & W.H. Hsieh (1987)
- Pseudocercospora melanotes (Syd.) U. Braun (1999)
- Pseudocercospora melastomobia (W. Yamam.) Goh & W.H. Hsieh (1987)
- Pseudocercospora meliacearum C.D. Sharma, Gadp., A.N. Rai & K.M. Vyas (1996)
- Pseudocercospora meliae A.N. Rai & Kamal (1982)
- Pseudocercospora melicyti U. Braun & C.F. Hill (2004)
- Pseudocercospora meliicola J.M. Yen, A.K. Kar & B.K. Das (1982)
- Pseudocercospora meliosmicola Y.L. Guo, Q. Zhao & Y.X. Shi (2019)
- Pseudocercospora melochiae (Henn.) Deighton (1976)
- Pseudocercospora melochiicola (Syd.) U. Braun & Crous (2003)
- Pseudocercospora melochiigena H.S.G. Rao, Arch. Singh & Kamal (1998)
- Pseudocercospora melothriae Sawada ex Goh & W.H. Hsieh (1987)
- Pseudocercospora membranaceae H.S.G. Rao & S. Narayan (1999)
- Pseudocercospora menispermacearum P. Kumar & Kamal (1981)
- Pseudocercospora merremiae Y.L. Guo (2011)
- Pseudocercospora metrosideri U. Braun (2001)
- Pseudocercospora meynae-laxiflorae Kamal, C. Gupta & A.N. Rai (1986)
- Pseudocercospora micheliae (Boedijn) U. Braun (2001)
- Pseudocercospora micheliicola J.M. Yen, A.K. Kar & B.K. Das (1982)
- Pseudocercospora miconiae (Gonz. Frag. & Cif.) U. Braun & Crous (2003)
- Pseudocercospora miconiicola (Chupp) U. Braun & Crous (2003)
- Pseudocercospora miconiigena U. Braun & Urtiaga (2008)
- Pseudocercospora microlepiae R. Kirschner (2015)
- Pseudocercospora micromeli Phengs., Chukeat., McKenzie, K.D. Hyde & U. Braun (2013)
- Pseudocercospora microphora (Seshadri) Deighton (1976)
- Pseudocercospora microsori R.G. Shivas, A.J. Young & B.C. McNeil (2010)
- Pseudocercospora midnapurensis (A.K. Kar & M. Mandal) Deighton (1979)
- Pseudocercospora miliusae Raghv. Singh, Sh. Kumar & Kamal (2011)
- Pseudocercospora miliusae-tomentosae Kamal (2010)
- Pseudocercospora millettiae Goh & W.H. Hsieh (1989)
- Pseudocercospora millettiicola Y.L. Guo (1991)
- Pseudocercospora millingtoniae Raghu Ram & Mallaiah (1996)
- Pseudocercospora mimosae (Pat.) U. Braun (1993)
- Pseudocercospora mimosigena U. Braun & F.O. Freire (2003)
- Pseudocercospora mimulicola (Pavgi) Pavgi & H.P. Upadhyay (1965)
- Pseudocercospora minuta S.R. Chowdhury & Chandel (1986)
- Pseudocercospora mirandensis (Chupp) R.F. Castañeda & U. Braun (1991)
- Pseudocercospora mississippiensis (Tracy & Earle) R.F. Castañeda & U. Braun (1989)
- Pseudocercospora mitracarpicola (J.M. Yen & Gilles) U. Braun & Crous (2003)
- Pseudocercospora mitragynae (Deighton, Pavgi & U.P. Singh) U. Braun (1995)
- Pseudocercospora mitteriana Goh & W.H. Hsieh (1990)
- Pseudocercospora modesta (Syd.) Deighton (1976)
- Pseudocercospora moelleriana (G. Winter) U. Braun (1997)
- Pseudocercospora mogiphanes (Speg.) U. Braun (1994)
- Pseudocercospora mombin (Petr. & Cif.) Deighton (1976)
- Pseudocercospora monochaeticola (Chupp) U. Braun & Crous (2003)
- Pseudocercospora monoicae (Ellis & Holw.) Deighton (1976)
- Pseudocercospora montanae C.D. Sharma, K.K. Gadpandey, A.N. Rai & K.M. Vyas (1996)
- Pseudocercospora montantiana M.D. Mehrotra (1987)
- Pseudocercospora montrichardiae (Henn.) U. Braun & F.O. Freire (2003)
- Pseudocercospora moracearum R.K. Verma & Kamal (1992)
- Pseudocercospora mori (Hara) Deighton (1976)
- Pseudocercospora moricola H.S.G. Rao, S. Narayan & Poonam Srivast. (1997)
- Pseudocercospora morindae (Syd.) Sarbajna (1989)
- Pseudocercospora morindicola (Jenkins & Chupp) U. Braun & McKenzie (1999)
- Pseudocercospora morongiae (Tracy & Earle) U. Braun & Crous (2003)
- Pseudocercospora mucronata (Purkay. & A.K. Pal bis) Kamal (2010)
- Pseudocercospora mucunae-ferrugineae (W. Yamam.) Deighton (1976)
- Pseudocercospora mucunicola (Cif. & Gonz. Frag.) Deighton (1976)
- Pseudocercospora mulderi (Tyagi) U. Braun (1995)
- Pseudocercospora mulleri Deighton (1976)
- Pseudocercospora mungo Deighton (1979)
- Pseudocercospora munroniae Y.L. Guo (2016)
- Pseudocercospora muntingiae (Petr. & Cif.) Deighton (1976)
- Pseudocercospora muntingiicola (J.M. Yen) J.M. Yen (1979)
- Pseudocercospora murrayae (A.K. Kar & M. Mandal) Deighton (1987)
- Pseudocercospora murrayicola P. Kumar & Kamal (1981)
- Pseudocercospora musae (Zimm.) Deighton (1976)
- Pseudocercospora musae-sapientium (A.K. Kar & M. Mandal) U. Braun & Mouch. (1999)
- Pseudocercospora musicola U. Braun (1999)
- Pseudocercospora mussaendae Katsuki (1956)
- Pseudocercospora mutabiliconidiophorum A. Hern.-Gut. & Dianese (2013)
- Pseudocercospora mycetiae Y.L. Guo (2001)
- Pseudocercospora myopori Y.L. Guo (2013)
- Pseudocercospora myriactidis Sawada ex Goh & W.H. Hsieh (1987)
- Pseudocercospora myricacearum M.K. Khan, Budathoki & Kamal (1991)
- Pseudocercospora myrtacearum (A.N. Rai, B. Rai & Kamal) U. Braun (1995)
- Pseudocercospora myrticola (Speg.) Deighton (1976)
- Pseudocercospora mysorensis (Thirum. & Chupp) Deighton (1976)
- Pseudocercospora mytilariae Y.L. Guo (2001)

== N ==
- Pseudocercospora naitoi (Togashi) C. Nakash. & Tak. Kobay. (1999)
- Pseudocercospora namae (Dearn. & House) U. Braun & Crous (2003)
- Pseudocercospora nandinae (Nagat.) X.J. Liu & Y.L. Guo (1992)
- Pseudocercospora naraveliae (A.K. Kar & M. Mandal) Deighton (1987)
- Pseudocercospora natalensis Crous & T.A. Cout. (1998)
- Pseudocercospora nelumbonicola R. Kirschner & Kuan L. Chen (2017)
- Pseudocercospora neobalsaminae C.D. Sharma, Gadp., A.N. Rai & K.M. Vyas (1996)
- Pseudocercospora neoboutoniae (Hansf.) Deighton (1976)
- Pseudocercospora neococculi S.L. Jain, A.N. Rai & P. Mehta (2003)
- Pseudocercospora neoliquidambaris C. Nakash. & Tak. Kobay. (2002)
- Pseudocercospora neophrymae C. Nakash. & Tak. Kobay. (2002)
- Pseudocercospora nephelii B. Sutton & Peregrine (1990)
- Pseudocercospora nepheloides (Ellis & Holw. ex Heald & F.A. Wolf) U. Braun, D.F. Farr & Minnis (2009)
- Pseudocercospora nephrolepidicola Crous & R.G. Shivas (2010)
- Pseudocercospora nephrolepidigena U. Braun, Meeboon & C. Nakash. (2013)
- Pseudocercospora nephrolepidis R. Kirschner (2007)
- Pseudocercospora neriella (Sacc.) Deighton (1976)
- Pseudocercospora nerii H.S.G. Rao, S. Narayan & Bhartiya (1996)
- Pseudocercospora neriicola Crous, Frisullo & Camele (2014)
- Pseudocercospora nesaeae (Ellis & Everh.) U. Braun (1999)
- Pseudocercospora newtonensis (Deighton) Deighton (1976)
- Pseudocercospora nicolaiae (Boedijn) U. Braun (2001)
- Pseudocercospora nicotianae-benthamianae Goh & W.H. Hsieh (1990)
- Pseudocercospora nigricans (Cooke) Deighton (1976)
- Pseudocercospora njalaensis Deighton (1987)
- Pseudocercospora nodosa (Constant.) U. Braun, C. Nakash., Videira & Crous (2017)
- Pseudocercospora nogalesii (Urries) U. Braun & M.A. Dick (2003)
- Pseudocercospora nojimae (Togashi & Katsuki) Y.L. Guo & X.J. Liu (1992)
- Pseudocercospora norchiensis Crous (2007)
- Pseudocercospora nothopegiae (T.S. Ramakr., Sriniv. & Sundaram) Deighton (1976)
- Pseudocercospora noveboracensis Goh & W.H. Hsieh (1990)
- Pseudocercospora nyctanthis (A.K. Roy) U. Braun, Bagyan. & Jagad. (1992)
- Pseudocercospora nymphaeacea (Cooke & Ellis) Deighton (1987)

== O ==
- Pseudocercospora oblecta (Syd.) Crous & U. Braun (2008)
- Pseudocercospora obtegens (Syd. & P. Syd.) U. Braun & Crous (2003)
- Pseudocercospora ocellata (Deighton) Deighton (1987)
- Pseudocercospora ocimi-basilici Crous, M.E. Palm & U. Braun (2012)
- Pseudocercospora ocimicola (Petr. & Cif.) Deighton (1976)
- Pseudocercospora odinae Sarbajna (1990)
- Pseudocercospora odontoglossi (Prill. & Delacr.) U. Braun (2002)
- Pseudocercospora odontonematis (Chupp) U. Braun & Crous (2003)
- Pseudocercospora oenotherae (Ellis & Everh.) Y.L. Guo & X.J. Liu (1992)
- Pseudocercospora oenotherae-speciosae U. Braun & Crous (2003)
- Pseudocercospora ogawae (Katsuki & Tak. Kobay.) Deighton (1987)
- Pseudocercospora olacicola (Muthappa) Kamal, M.K. Khan & R.K. Verma (1990)
- Pseudocercospora olacis-zeylanicae R.K. Chaudhary & V.K. Pal (2007)
- Pseudocercospora oleariae U. Braun & M.A. Dick (2003)
- Pseudocercospora oliniae (Verwoerd & Dippen.) Crous & U. Braun (1996)
- Pseudocercospora onagrae (Purkay. & Mallik) Kamal (2010)
- Pseudocercospora operculinae H.S.G. Rao, Arch. Singh & Kamal (1998)
- Pseudocercospora opuli (Fuckel) U. Braun & Crous (2003)
- Pseudocercospora opuntiae Ayala-Escobar, U. Braun & Crous (2006)
- Pseudocercospora orchidacearum U. Braun (2014)
- Pseudocercospora ormosiae Y.L. Guo & Y.R. Lin (1995)
- Pseudocercospora orogeniae (W.B. Cooke & C.G. Shaw) U. Braun & Crous (2003)
- Pseudocercospora oroxyli (A.K. Kar & M. Mandal) Deighton (1987)
- Pseudocercospora oroxyligena J.M. Yen, A.K. Kar & B.K. Das (1982)
- Pseudocercospora osbeckiae (Chona, Lall & Munjal) Kamal, M.K. Khan & R.K. Verma (1990)
- Pseudocercospora osmanthi-asiatici Sawada ex Goh & W.H. Hsieh (1987)
- Pseudocercospora osmanthicola (P.K. Chi & C.K. Pai) X.J. Liu & Y.L. Guo (1991)
- Pseudocercospora oxybaphi (Ellis & Halst.) U. Braun & Crous (2003)
- Pseudocercospora oxydendri (Tracy & Earle) U. Braun (1999)
- Pseudocercospora oxysporae (A.K. Kar & M. Mandal) Deighton (1987)
- Pseudocercospora oxystelmatis (S.A. Khan & M. Kamal) Kamal, A.N. Rai & A.S. Moses (1991)
- Pseudocercospora oyedaeae (Syd.) U. Braun & Crous (2003)

== P ==
- Pseudocercospora pachirae U. Braun, Crous & N. Pons (2003)
- Pseudocercospora pachyrhizi (Sawada & Katsuki) Goh & W.H. Hsieh (1987)
- Pseudocercospora paederiae Sawada ex Goh & W.H. Hsieh (1990)
- Pseudocercospora pahudiae (Syd. & P. Syd.) U. Braun & Crous (2003)
- Pseudocercospora palicoureae O.L. Pereira & R.W. Barreto (2006)
- Pseudocercospora palicoureina (Petr. & Cif.) U. Braun (2001)
- Pseudocercospora palleobrunnea Cheew. & Crous (2009)
- Pseudocercospora pallida (Ellis & Everh.) H.D. Shin & U. Braun (2000)
- Pseudocercospora paludicola (Speg.) U. Braun (2000)
- Pseudocercospora pamelae-ellisiae (G.P. Agarwal & N.D. Sharma) U. Braun (1999)
- Pseudocercospora pampangensis (Petr.) U. Braun (1996)
- Pseudocercospora panacis (Thirum. & Chupp) Y.L. Guo & X.J. Liu (1992)
- Pseudocercospora pancratii (Ellis & Everh.) U. Braun & R.F. Castañeda (1991)
- Pseudocercospora pandoreae U. Braun & C.F. Hill (2006)
- Pseudocercospora pangiicola U. Braun & Sivap. (1999)
- Pseudocercospora paradoxa U. Braun & Bagyan. (1999)
- Pseudocercospora paraexosporioides C. Nakash. & U. Braun (2013)
- Pseudocercospora paraguayensis (Tak. Kobay.) Crous (1996)
- Pseudocercospora paramignyae (Thirum. & Chupp) Y.L. Guo (1993)
- Pseudocercospora paranaensis Guatim., R.W. Barreto & Crous (2016)
- Pseudocercospora parapseudarthriae Crous & A.R. Wood (2014)
- Pseudocercospora pareirae (Speg.) Crous & U. Braun (1996)
- Pseudocercospora parviflorae H.S.G. Rao, S. Narayan & Bhartiya (1996)
- Pseudocercospora passiflorae U. Braun & Crous (2003)
- Pseudocercospora passiflorae-setaceae A.C. Dianese, A.M. Costa & Dianese (2008)
- Pseudocercospora paulliniae U. Braun & Urtiaga (2013)
- Pseudocercospora paulowniae Goh & W.H. Hsieh (1990)
- Pseudocercospora pavettae-indicae (Govindu & Thirum.) J.M. Yen, A.K. Kar & B.K. Das (1982)
- Pseudocercospora pavoniae (Petr. & Cif.) U. Braun (2001)
- Pseudocercospora pediformiconidiorum A. Hern.-Gut. & Dianese (2013)
- Pseudocercospora pehriae U. Braun & Urtiaga (2008)
- Pseudocercospora pehriicola U. Braun & Urtiaga (2012)
- Pseudocercospora peltophori (J.M. Yen) J.M. Yen (1980)
- Pseudocercospora penicillus (Ellis & Everh.) U. Braun & Crous (2003)
- Pseudocercospora penstemonis (Ellis & Kellerm.) U. Braun (1999)
- Pseudocercospora pentanematis U. Braun & Crous (2003)
- Pseudocercospora pentatropidis (S.A. Khan) Deighton (1976)
- Pseudocercospora perae Meir. Silva, R.W. Barreto & Crous (2016)
- Pseudocercospora pereskiae O.L. Pereira & R.W. Barreto (2007)
- Pseudocercospora pergulariae (J.M. Yen & Lim) J.M. Yen (1980)
- Pseudocercospora perillulae (Togashi & Katsuki) X.J. Liu & Y.L. Guo (1992)
- Pseudocercospora peristeriae (H.C. Burnett) U. Braun & Crous (2003)
- Pseudocercospora peronosporoidea (Pat. & Har.) Deighton (1981)
- Pseudocercospora persicariae (W. Yamam.) Deighton (1976)
- Pseudocercospora petila Goh & W.H. Hsieh (1990)
- Pseudocercospora phaea (Syd.) Deighton (1976)
- Pseudocercospora phaeochlora (Speg.) U. Braun, Delhey & Kiehr (2001)
- Pseudocercospora phaseolicola Goh & W.H. Hsieh (1990)
- Pseudocercospora philippinensis (Tak. Kobay. & E.D. Guzmán) U. Braun & Crous (2003)
- Pseudocercospora photiniae (Fukui) C. Nakash. & Tak. Kobay. (2000)
- Pseudocercospora photiniae-serrulatae (L. Anzal. & Plakidas) U. Braun & Crous (2007)
- Pseudocercospora phrymae Y.L. Guo & X.J. Liu (1991)
- Pseudocercospora phyllanthi (Chupp) Deighton (1976)
- Pseudocercospora phyllanthi-niruri (J.M. Yen) J.M. Yen (1980)
- Pseudocercospora phyllanthi-reticulati Deighton (1976)
- Pseudocercospora phyllitidis (H.H. Hume) U. Braun & Crous (2003)
- Pseudocercospora physalidis-minimae v(Pavgi & U.P. Singh) Deighton (1976)
- Pseudocercospora physaligena P.N. Singh, M.S. Tripathi, A.N. Singh bis & R.K. Chaudhary (1998)
- Pseudocercospora physostegiae (W.A. Jenkins ex Chupp) U. Braun & Crous (2009)
- Pseudocercospora phytolaccacearum Kamal, C. Gupta & A.N. Rai (1986)
- Pseudocercospora picramniae U. Braun & Urtiaga (2013)
- Pseudocercospora picrasmicola Y.L. Guo & F.Y. Zhai (2016)
- Pseudocercospora pileae P.N. Singh, S.K. Singh & S.C. Tripathi (1996)
- Pseudocercospora pilicola (Petr. & Cif.) U. Braun (2001)
- Pseudocercospora piperigena U. Braun & F.O. Freire (2006)
- Pseudocercospora piperina (J.M. Yen) J.M. Yen (1980)
- Pseudocercospora piperis (Pat.) Deighton (1976)
- Pseudocercospora piperis-arborei D.J. Soares, F.B. Rocha & R.W. Barreto (2008)
- Pseudocercospora piperis-gigantifolii F.B. Rocha, D.J. Soares & R.W. Barreto (2008)
- Pseudocercospora piperis-muricati (J.M. Yen) J.M. Yen (1980)
- Pseudocercospora pipturi (F. Stevens & Glick) U. Braun & Crous (2003)
- Pseudocercospora pipturicola U. Braun & McKenzie (1999)
- Pseudocercospora pistaciae (Chupp) Crous & U. Braun (2001)
- Pseudocercospora pistacina (Allesch.) Crous, Quaedvl. & Sarpkaya (2013)
- Pseudocercospora pittieri (Syd.) Deighton (1976)
- Pseudocercospora pittospori (Plakidas) Y.L. Guo & X.J. Liu (1991)
- Pseudocercospora plagiogyriae Sawada ex Goh & W.H. Hsieh (1987)
- Pseudocercospora planaltinensis A. Hern.-Gut. & Dianese (2013)
- Pseudocercospora platani (J.M. Yen) J.M. Yen (1979)
- Pseudocercospora platanicola (Ellis & Everh.) U. Braun (1997)
- Pseudocercospora platanigena Videira & Crous (2017)
- Pseudocercospora platensis (Speg.) U. Braun (2000)
- Pseudocercospora platycaryae Goh & W.H. Hsieh (1989)
- Pseudocercospora platylobii Beilharz & Cunningt. (2003)
- Pseudocercospora plectranthi G.C. Hunter, Crous, U. Braun & H.D. Shin (2012)
- Pseudocercospora plumeriae (Chupp) Tak. Kobay., Nishij. & C. Nakash. (1998)
- Pseudocercospora plumeriifolii (Bat. & Peres) U. Braun, J.C. David & F.O. Freire (1999)
- Pseudocercospora plunkettii (Chupp) R.F. Castañeda & U. Braun (1991)
- Pseudocercospora pluriseptata C.D. Sharma, Gadp., A.N. Rai & K.M. Vyas (1996)
- Pseudocercospora pogostemonis (A.K. Singh & Kamal) U. Braun (1995)
- Pseudocercospora polliae Sawada ex Goh & W.H. Hsieh (1987)
- Pseudocercospora poltronieriana U. Braun & F.O. Freire (2006)
- Pseudocercospora polyalthiae J.M. Yen, A.K. Kar & B.K. Das (1982)
- Pseudocercospora polygonicola (A.K. Kar & M. Mandal) Deighton (1987)
- Pseudocercospora polygonigena (J.M. Yen) U. Braun & Crous (2003)
- Pseudocercospora polygonorum (Cooke) Y.L. Guo & X.J. Liu (1991)
- Pseudocercospora polymniae (Chupp) U. Braun & Crous (2003)
- Pseudocercospora polypodiacearum D.N. Shukla, A.K. Singh, P. Kumar & Kamal (1982)
- Pseudocercospora polysciadis (S.H. Sun) J.M. Yen (1979)
- Pseudocercospora polysciatis-pinnatae U. Braun & Mouch. (1999)
- Pseudocercospora polytricha (Cooke) Chupp (1954)
- Pseudocercospora pomaderridis U. Braun & C.F. Hill (2003)
- Pseudocercospora pometiae U. Braun & R.G. Shivas (2008)
- Pseudocercospora pongamiae-pinnatae Raghu Ram & Mallaiah (1993)
- Pseudocercospora populi U. Braun & M. Morelet (2000)
- Pseudocercospora populigena U. Braun, Alé-Agha & Feige (2005)
- Pseudocercospora poranae (Suj. Singh) A.K. Das & Chattopadh. (1990)
- Pseudocercospora portilloi (Unamuno) U. Braun & Crous (2003)
- Pseudocercospora pothomorphes Meir. Silva, R.W. Barreto & Crous (2016)
- Pseudocercospora pouzolziae (Syd.) Y.L. Guo & X.J. Liu (1992)
- Pseudocercospora pouzolziae-indicae Kamal (2010)
- Pseudocercospora premnicola Y.L. Guo & X.J. Liu (1992)
- Pseudocercospora profusa (Syd. & P. Syd.) Deighton (1987)
- Pseudocercospora proiphydis R.G. Shivas, Marney & Y.P. Tan (2014)
- Pseudocercospora proteae Crous (2012)
- Pseudocercospora protearum (Cooke) U. Braun & Crous (2002)
- Pseudocercospora protensa (Syd.) Deighton (1976)
- Pseudocercospora protii A. Hern.-Gut. & Dianese (2009)
- Pseudocercospora pruinosivora (V.G. Rao & B.R.D. Yadav) Kamal (2010)
- Pseudocercospora prunicola (Ellis & Everh.) U. Braun (1997)
- Pseudocercospora pruni-persicicola (J.M. Yen) J.M. Yen (1981)
- Pseudocercospora pruni-yedoensis Sawada ex Goh & W.H. Hsieh (1990)
- Pseudocercospora pseudarthriae (Petch) Deighton (1976)
- Pseudocercospora pseudehretiae Chao H. Chung & Tzean (2000)
- Pseudocercospora pseudobasitruncata U. Braun & M.A. Dick (2002)
- Pseudocercospora pseudobombacis A. Hern.-Gut. & Dianese (2009)
- Pseudocercospora pseudoeucalyptorum Crous (2004)
- Pseudocercospora pseudomusae Crous & Carlier (2020)
- Pseudocercospora pseudomyrticola Crous (2019)
- Pseudocercospora pseudostigmina-platani Crous, U. Braun & H.D. Shin (2012)
- Pseudocercospora pseudotrichodesmatis Bagyan., Jagad. & U. Braun (1991)
- Pseudocercospora psidii (Rangel) R.F. Castañeda & U. Braun (1989)
- Pseudocercospora psophocarpi (J.M. Yen) Deighton (1976)
- Pseudocercospora psoraleae H.S.G. Rao, A.S. Moses & S. Narayan (1996)
- Pseudocercospora psoraleae-bituminosae (Săvul. & Sandu) Sarbajna (1989)
- Pseudocercospora psorospermi Deighton (1979)
- Pseudocercospora psychotriicola (Chupp & Doidge) Crous & U. Braun (1994)
- Pseudocercospora pteridicola U. Braun & Y.L. Guo (1997)
- Pseudocercospora pteridigena U. Braun (2013)
- Pseudocercospora pteridophytophila Goh & W.H. Hsieh (1989)
- Pseudocercospora pterocarpicola (J.M. Yen) J.M. Yen (1980)
- Pseudocercospora pterocaryae Y.L. Guo & W.X. Zhao (1989)
- Pseudocercospora pterocauli (Petr.) Deighton (1976)
- Pseudocercospora pteroceltidis U. Braun & Y.L. Guo (1997)
- Pseudocercospora ptisanae U. Braun (2013)
- Pseudocercospora puderi B.H. Davis ex Deighton (1976)
- Pseudocercospora puerariae (Syd. & P. Syd.) Deighton (1976)
- Pseudocercospora puerariicola (W. Yamam.) Deighton (1976)
- Pseudocercospora puerariina (J.M. Yen) J.M. Yen (1980)
- Pseudocercospora pulviniformis (J. Kranz) Deighton (1976)
- Pseudocercospora pulvinula (Cooke & Ellis) U. Braun (2003)
- Pseudocercospora pulvinulata (Sacc. & G. Winter) U. Braun (1997)
- Pseudocercospora punctata (Wakef.) B. Sutton (1993)
- Pseudocercospora punctiformis Goh & W.H. Hsieh (1990)
- Pseudocercospora punensis S.K. Singh, Dhanorkar & Waing. (2004)
- Pseudocercospora punicae (Henn.) Deighton (1976)
- Pseudocercospora punjabensis (Syd.) U. Braun & Bagyan. (1999)
- Pseudocercospora purpurea (Cooke) Deighton (1976)
- Pseudocercospora putranjivae Kamal, P. Kumar, R.P. Singh & D.N. Shukla (1980)
- Pseudocercospora pycnidioides (Chupp) U. Braun & Crous (2003)
- Pseudocercospora pyracanthae (Katsuki) C. Nakash. & Tak. Kobay. (1997)
- Pseudocercospora pyracanthae-fortuneanae Z. Liu, Y. Zhang ter & U. Braun (2016)
- Pseudocercospora pyracanthigena Crous, U. Braun & H.D. Shin (2012)
- Pseudocercospora pyricola (Sawada) J.M. Yen (1981)
- Pseudocercospora pyrina Goh & W.H. Hsieh (1990)

== Q ==
- Pseudocercospora qinlingensis Y.L. Guo (1996)
- Pseudocercospora quarta (Chupp & H.C. Greene) Y.L. Guo & Y. Jiang (2000)
- Pseudocercospora quisqualidis (Narain & B.S. Mehrotra) Z.D. Jiang & P.K. Chi (1994)

== R ==
- Pseudocercospora radermacherae (Boedijn) U. Braun (2001)
- Pseudocercospora radermachericola Phengs., McKenzie, K.D. Hyde & U. Braun (2010)
- Pseudocercospora ramischiae (Melnik) U. Braun & Melnik (1997)
- Pseudocercospora randiae (Thirum. & Govindu) Y.L. Guo & X.J. Liu (1993)
- Pseudocercospora ranjita (S. Chowdhury) Deighton (1976)
- Pseudocercospora ranunculacearum C. Gupta, Abbasi & Kamal (1987)
- Pseudocercospora rapaneae (Syd.) U. Braun (1999)
- Pseudocercospora rauvolfiae Deighton (1983)
- Pseudocercospora rauvolfiae-serpentinae H.S. Rao, Arch. Singh & Kamal (1996)
- Pseudocercospora rauvolfiae-tetraphyllae U. Braun & Urtiaga (2012)
- Pseudocercospora ravenalicola G.C. Hunter & Crous (2012)
- Pseudocercospora repens (Ellis & Everh.) U. Braun (1997)
- Pseudocercospora rhabdothamni U. Braun & C.F. Hill (2004)
- Pseudocercospora rhamnacearum A.K. Singh, H.B. Singh & Kamal (2004)
- Pseudocercospora rhamnaceicola Goh & W.H. Hsieh (1990)
- Pseudocercospora rhamnellae G.C. Hunter, H.D. Shin, U. Braun & Crous (2012)
- Pseudocercospora rhapidicola (Tominaga) Goh & W.H. Hsieh (1989)
- Pseudocercospora rhigiocaryae (J.M. Yen & Gilles) J.M. Yen (1979)
- Pseudocercospora rhinacanthi (Höhn.) Deighton (1976)
- Pseudocercospora rhinocarpi U. Braun & Crous (2003)
- Pseudocercospora rhizophoricola Deighton (1976)
- Pseudocercospora rhododendricola (J.M. Yen) Deighton (1987)
- Pseudocercospora rhododendrigena C. Nakash. (2011)
- Pseudocercospora rhododendri-indici Crous, U. Braun & H.D. Shin (2012)
- Pseudocercospora rhoicissi (Syd. & P. Syd.) Deighton (1976)
- Pseudocercospora rhoicola U. Braun (2016)
- Pseudocercospora rhoina (Cooke & Ellis) Deighton (1976)
- Pseudocercospora rhois Y.L. Guo & X.J. Liu (1987)
- Pseudocercospora rhynchosiae-suaveolentis Raghu Ram & Mallaiah (1993)
- Pseudocercospora rhynchosiarum (Petr. & Cif.) U. Braun (2001)
- Pseudocercospora rhynchosiicola Bagyan., Jagad. & U. Braun (1991)
- Pseudocercospora riachueli (Speg.) Deighton (1976)
- Pseudocercospora ribicola (Ellis & Everh.) U. Braun & Crous (2002)
- Pseudocercospora richardsoniicola Crous & M.P.S. Câmara (1998)
- Pseudocercospora rigidae Meir. Silva & O.L. Pereira (2007)
- Pseudocercospora robusta Crous & M.J. Wingf. (1998)
- Pseudocercospora rogersoniana U. Braun & Crous (1996)
- Pseudocercospora rosae J.F. Li, A. Mapook & K.D. Hyde (2018)
- Pseudocercospora rothmaleri U. Braun & Urtiaga (2008)
- Pseudocercospora roystoneae U. Braun & Crous (2003)
- Pseudocercospora rubicola (Thüm.) X.J. Liu & Y.L. Guo (1993)
- Pseudocercospora rubropurpurea (S.H. Sun) J.M. Yen (1981)
- Pseudocercospora rugosi (Chupp) U. Braun & Crous (2003)
- Pseudocercospora rumohrae Goh & W.H. Hsieh (1989)
- Pseudocercospora rungiae R.K. Verma & Kamal (1992)

== S ==
- Pseudocercospora sabatiae (Ellis & Everh.) U. Braun & Crous (2003)
- Pseudocercospora sabiae Y.L. Guo & W.X. Zhao (1989)
- Pseudocercospora sacchari U. Braun & Crous (2003)
- Pseudocercospora saccharicola (S.H. Sun) J.M. Yen (1981)
- Pseudocercospora sagarensis Firdousi, A.N. Rai & K.M. Vyas (1993)
- Pseudocercospora saketensis P. Mukerjee & B.B. Singh (1983)
- Pseudocercospora salicina (Ellis & Everh.) Deighton (1976)
- Pseudocercospora salvadorae (Maire) Deighton (1976)
- Pseudocercospora salviae Goh & W.H. Hsieh (1989)
- Pseudocercospora samaneae U. Braun & Crous (2003)
- Pseudocercospora sambucigena U. Braun, Crous & K. Schub. (2005)
- Pseudocercospora samuhabeeja R.K. Verma, M.K. Khan & Kamal (1989)
- Pseudocercospora samydacearum A.K. Singh, Kamal & Shiv K. Singh (1985)
- Pseudocercospora saniculae-europaeae (E. Müll. & Arx) U. Braun & Crous (2003)
- Pseudocercospora santalacea (K.R.G. Nair) U. Braun & Crous (2003)
- Pseudocercospora sapiicola (Speg.) U. Braun (1999)
- Pseudocercospora sapii-sebiferi Sawada ex Goh & W.H. Hsieh (1990)
- Pseudocercospora sapindi-emarginati (T.S. Ramakr. & K. Ramakr.) Y.L. Guo & X.J. Liu (1993)
- Pseudocercospora sarcocephali (Vienn.-Bourg.) Deighton (1976)
- Pseudocercospora saururicola Sawada ex Goh & W.H. Hsieh (1990)
- Pseudocercospora sawadae (W. Yamam.) Goh & W.H. Hsieh (1987)
- Pseudocercospora scabrellae R. Chaudhary, C. Gupta & Kamal (1991)
- Pseudocercospora scaevolae U. Braun & Mouch. (1999)
- Pseudocercospora schefflerae W.H. Hsieh & Goh (1990)
- Pseudocercospora schefflericola Y.L. Guo (2001)
- Pseudocercospora schini (Syd. & P. Syd.) U. Braun & Crous (2003)
- Pseudocercospora schizolobii (M.J. Wingf. & Crous) M.J. Wingf. & Crous (2009)
- Pseudocercospora schleicherae-oleosae N. Sharma, Soni & R.K. Verma (2006)
- Pseudocercospora schrankiicola U. Braun & F.O. Freire (2004)
- Pseudocercospora sciadopityos C. Nakash. & Tak. Kobay. (2013)
- Pseudocercospora scitula (Syd.) Deighton (1976)
- Pseudocercospora scopariicola (J.M. Yen) Deighton (1976)
- Pseudocercospora scutellariae (Ellis & Everh.) U. Braun (1999)
- Pseudocercospora sebastianiae (R.E.D. Baker & W.T. Dale) Deighton (1976)
- Pseudocercospora securinegae (Togashi & Katsuki) Deighton (1976)
- Pseudocercospora sedi (Ellis & Everh.) U. Braun (1997)
- Pseudocercospora sedoides (Ellis & Everh.) U. Braun & Crous (2003)
- Pseudocercospora sennae A. Hern.-Gut., Z.M. Chaves & Dianese (2015)
- Pseudocercospora sennae-multijugae Meir. Silva, R.W. Barreto & Crous (2016)
- Pseudocercospora sennae-rugosae A. Hern.-Gut., Z.M. Chaves & Dianese (2015)
- Pseudocercospora sennicola Y. Meswaet, Mangelsdorff, Yorou & M. Piepenbr. (2021)
- Pseudocercospora seropedicensis Andrade, Medeiros & Inácio (2020)
- Pseudocercospora serpentinae (Pandotra & A. Husain) Deighton (1976)
- Pseudocercospora serpocaulonicola Guatim., R.W. Barreto & Crous (2016)
- Pseudocercospora sesbaniae (Henn.) Deighton (1976)
- Pseudocercospora sesbaniicola J.M. Yen (1981)
- Pseudocercospora shihmenensis (J.M. Yen) J.M. Yen (1981)
- Pseudocercospora shoreae-robustae U. Braun (1995)
- Pseudocercospora sicerariae Deighton (1976)
- Pseudocercospora sidae (Henn.) Deighton (1976)
- Pseudocercospora sieberiana Raghu Ram & Mallaiah (1993)
- Pseudocercospora silphii (Ellis & Everh.) U. Braun (1999)
- Pseudocercospora simaroubae U. Braun & F.O. Freire (2003)
- Pseudocercospora simirae U. Braun (2013)
- Pseudocercospora singaporensis (J.M. Yen) J.M. Yen (1980)
- Pseudocercospora siparunae D.J. Soares & R.W. Barreto (2005)
- Pseudocercospora siraitiae R. Kirschner & U. Braun (2003)
- Pseudocercospora smilacicola U. Braun (2014)
- Pseudocercospora smilacis Budathoki & S.K. Singh (1995)
- Pseudocercospora snelliana (Reichert) U. Braun, H.D. Shin, C. Nakash. & Crous (2012)
- Pseudocercospora solanacea B.K. Gupta & Kamal ex U. Braun (1995)
- Pseudocercospora solandrae R. Kirschner & U. Braun (2006)
- Pseudocercospora solani-asperi (R.E.D. Baker & W.T. Dale) Deighton (1976)
- Pseudocercospora solani-cernui Rembinski, Oliveira & Inácio (2020)
- Pseudocercospora solani-longisporae (J.M. Yen) J.M. Yen (1979)
- Pseudocercospora solani-melongenicola Goh & W.H. Hsieh (1990)
- Pseudocercospora solani-pseudocapsicicola Meir. Silva, R.W. Barreto & Crous (2016)
- Pseudocercospora solani-torvicola Goh & W.H. Hsieh (1989)
- Pseudocercospora solenae-heterophyllae (R.K. Verma & Kamal) U. Braun (2000)
- Pseudocercospora solenostemonis (J.M. Yen & Gilles) Deighton (1976)
- Pseudocercospora sophorae Y.L. Guo & X.J. Liu (1991)
- Pseudocercospora sophoricola Bakhshi, Arzanlou, Babai-ahari & Crous (2014)
- Pseudocercospora sordida (Sacc.) Deighton (1976)
- Pseudocercospora sparsa (Cooke) U. Braun & Crous (2003)
- Pseudocercospora spegazziniana U. Braun (1994)
- Pseudocercospora sphaerellae-eugeniae (Rangel ex Sacc.) Crous, Alfenas & R.W. Barreto (1997)
- Pseudocercospora sphaeriiformis (Cooke) Y.L. Guo & X.J. Liu (1992)
- Pseudocercospora sphaerulinae Crous & M.J. Wingf. (2003)
- Pseudocercospora sphendamnophila R. Kirschner (2009)
- Pseudocercospora spilosticta (Syd.) Deighton (1976)
- Pseudocercospora spinosae (Chupp) Deighton (1976)
- Pseudocercospora spiraeicola (A.S. Mull. & Chupp) X.J. Liu & Y.L. Guo (1992)
- Pseudocercospora stachyurina Goh & W.H. Hsieh (1989)
- Pseudocercospora stahlii (F. Stevens) Deighton (1976)
- Pseudocercospora stemonae (Boedijn) U. Braun (2001)
- Pseudocercospora stephanandrae (Tak. Kobay. & H. Horie) C. Nakash. & Tak. Kobay. (2000)
- Pseudocercospora stephaniae Kamal, M.K. Khan & R.K. Verma (1990)
- Pseudocercospora stephaniicola Y.L. Guo (1999)
- Pseudocercospora stephanotidis (J.M. Yen) J.M. Yen (1980)
- Pseudocercospora sterculiana Deighton (1976)
- Pseudocercospora stereospermi Y.L. Guo (2017)
- Pseudocercospora stereospermicola Srisk. & Sivan. (1980)
- Pseudocercospora stevensii (E. Young) U. Braun & Crous (2003)
- Pseudocercospora stigmaphyllicola (J.M. Yen) Deighton (1976)
- Pseudocercospora stillingiae (Ellis & Everh.) J.M. Yen, A.K. Kar & B.K. Das (1982)
- Pseudocercospora stizolobii (Syd. & P. Syd.) Deighton (1976)
- Pseudocercospora stranvaesiae (Katsuki & Tak. Kobay.) Deighton (1987)
- Pseudocercospora strebli (R.P. Singh) U. Braun (1994)
- Pseudocercospora stromatosa Joanne E. Taylor & Crous (2000)
- Pseudocercospora struthanthi U. Braun, F.O. Freire & N. Pons (2003)
- Pseudocercospora strychni (Syd.) U. Braun, Bagyan. & Jagad. (1992)
- Pseudocercospora stryphnodendri A. Hern.-Gut., Z.M. Chaves & Dianese (2015)
- Pseudocercospora styracigena B.J. Li & Y.L. Guo (2015)
- Pseudocercospora styracina V.P. Abreu & O.L. Pereira (2018)
- Pseudocercospora subcuticularis A. Hern.-Gut., Z.M. Chaves & Dianese (2015)
- Pseudocercospora subhyalina A. Hern.-Gut. & Dianese (2013)
- Pseudocercospora subramanianii U. Braun & C. Nakash. (2013)
- Pseudocercospora subrufa (Ellis & Holw.) U. Braun (1993)
- Pseudocercospora subsessilis (Syd. & P. Syd.) Deighton (1976)
- Pseudocercospora subsynnematosa Parreira & D.J. Soares (2014)
- Pseudocercospora subtorulosa (Syd. & P. Syd.) U. Braun & Crous (2003)
- Pseudocercospora subulata Z.Q. Yuan, de Little & C. Mohammed (2000)
- Pseudocercospora sugimotoana (Katsuki) Y.L. Guo & X.J. Liu (1993)
- Pseudocercospora superficialis R.K. Verma, M.K. Khan & Kamal (1989)
- Pseudocercospora swieteniae U. Braun & Urtiaga (2008)
- Pseudocercospora sydowiana (Chupp) U. Braun & Crous (1999)
- Pseudocercospora symphyti Goh & W.H. Hsieh (1989)
- Pseudocercospora symploci Katsuki & Tak. Kobay. ex U. Braun & Crous (2003)
- Pseudocercospora symplocicola (J.M. Yen) U. Braun & Crous (2003)
- Pseudocercospora synedrellae (J.M. Yen & Gilles) Deighton (1976)
- Pseudocercospora syzygiicola B. Sutton & Crous (1997)
- Pseudocercospora syzygii-cumini U. Braun & Bagyan. (1999)
- Pseudocercospora syzygiigena U. Braun (2001)
- Pseudocercospora syzygiorum B. Sutton & Crous (1997)

== T ==
- Pseudocercospora tabebuiae-caraibae Inácio & Dianese (2006)
- Pseudocercospora tabebuiae-roseoalbae Inácio & Dianese (1998)
- Pseudocercospora tabei Y. Meswaet, Mangelsdorff, Yorou & M. Piepenbr. (2021)
- Pseudocercospora tabernaemontanae (Syd. & P. Syd.) Deighton (1976)
- Pseudocercospora tabernaemontanicola (J.M. Yen) J.M. Yen (1980)
- Pseudocercospora tacazzeae (J.M. Yen & Gilles) J.M. Yen (1979)
- Pseudocercospora tagetis (A.K. Kar & M. Mandal) U. Braun & Crous (2003)
- Pseudocercospora tagetis-erectae Goh & W.H. Hsieh (1989)
- Pseudocercospora taichungensis Goh & W.H. Hsieh (1990)
- Pseudocercospora takiensis A.K. Das (1991)
- Pseudocercospora talisiae U. Braun & F.O. Freire (2003)
- Pseudocercospora tamarindi Goonas. & K.D. Hyde (2015)
- Pseudocercospora tamoneae (Chupp) U. Braun & R.F. Castañeda (1991)
- Pseudocercospora tandojamensis (S.A. Khan & M. Kamal) U. Braun & Crous (2003)
- Pseudocercospora tecomae-heterophyllae (J.M. Yen) Y.L. Guo & X.J. Liu (1993)
- Pseudocercospora tecomicola (J.M. Yen) U. Braun & Bagyan. (1999)
- Pseudocercospora tectariae R. Kirschner (2015)
- Pseudocercospora tectonae Phengs., Chukeat., McKenzie, K.D. Hyde & U. Braun (2013)
- Pseudocercospora tectonicola J.M. Yen, A.K. Kar & B.K. Das (1982)
- Pseudocercospora tenuis (Peck) U. Braun & Crous (2003)
- Pseudocercospora tephrosiae A.N. Rai & Kamal (1989)
- Pseudocercospora teraiensis A.K. Singh, H.B. Singh & Kamal (2004)
- Pseudocercospora teramnicola U. Braun & Urtiaga (2013)
- Pseudocercospora tereticornis Crous & Carnegie (2009)
- Pseudocercospora terminaliae (Syd.) Deighton (1976)
- Pseudocercospora tessellata U. Braun (2020)
- Pseudocercospora tetramelis A.N. Shukla & Sarmah (1984)
- Pseudocercospora tetrapanacis (Sawada ex S.C. Jong & E.F. Morris) Deighton (1990)
- Pseudocercospora tetraulaciicola U. Braun & F.O. Freire (2003)
- Pseudocercospora teysmanii (G.C.S. Barua & K.C. Barua) U. Braun & Crous (2003)
- Pseudocercospora thailandica Crous, Himaman & M.J. Wingf. (2004)
- Pseudocercospora theae (Cavara) Deighton (1987)
- Pseudocercospora thelypteridis Goh & W.H. Hsieh (1989)
- Pseudocercospora thermopsidis (Earle) U. Braun & Crous (2002)
- Pseudocercospora thespesiae (Suj. Singh) R.K. Verma, M.K. Khan & Kamal (1989)
- Pseudocercospora thiloae U. Braun, J.C. David & F.O. Freire (1999)
- Pseudocercospora thladianthae (Sawada) Goh & W.H. Hsieh (1987)
- Pseudocercospora thouiniae (F. Stevens) U. Braun & Crous (2003)
- Pseudocercospora thujina (Dearn.) U. Braun & C. Nakash. (2013)
- Pseudocercospora thunbergiae (Boedijn) U. Braun & Sivap. (1999)
- Pseudocercospora thunbergiicola (J.M. Yen) Deighton (1976)
- Pseudocercospora thymicola Pellic. (2002)
- Pseudocercospora tibouchinae (Viégas) Deighton (1987)
- Pseudocercospora tibouchinae-herbaceae D.F. Parreira & R.W. Barreto (2014)
- Pseudocercospora tibouchinicola Parreira & D.J. Soares (2014)
- Pseudocercospora tibouchinigena Crous & U. Braun (2012)
- Pseudocercospora tiglii (Henn.) Crous, U. Braun & Alfenas (1999)
- Pseudocercospora tiliacearum Bhalla, A.K. Sarbhoy, M. Kulshr. & K.P.S. Kushwaha (2001)
- Pseudocercospora tiliacorae (A.K. Kar & M. Mandal) Deighton (1987)
- Pseudocercospora timorensis (Cooke) Deighton (1976)
- Pseudocercospora tinea Y.L. Guo & W.H. Hsieh (1995)
- Pseudocercospora tinosporae A.N. Rai & Kamal (1989)
- Pseudocercospora tinosporicola U. Braun & Bagyan. (1992)
- Pseudocercospora tinosporigena U. Braun (2005)
- Pseudocercospora toonae M.D. Mehrotra & R.K. Verma (1991)
- Pseudocercospora toonae-ciliatae U. Braun (2013)
- Pseudocercospora toreniae (Henn.) Deighton (1976)
- Pseudocercospora torta (Tracy & Earle) U. Braun & Crous (2003)
- Pseudocercospora tovariae U. Braun & Crous (2003)
- Pseudocercospora transvaalensis (Syd.) Deighton (1976)
- Pseudocercospora trematicola (J.M. Yen) Deighton (1976)
- Pseudocercospora trematigena U. Braun & F.O. Freire (2006)
- Pseudocercospora trematis-cannabini (J.M. Yen & Lim) Deighton (1976)
- Pseudocercospora trematis-guineensis (J.M. Yen & Gilles) J.M. Yen (1979)
- Pseudocercospora trematis-orientalis (S.K. Sun) Deighton (1976)
- Pseudocercospora trewiae-nodiflorae H.S.G. Rao, Arch. Singh & Kamal (1998)
- Pseudocercospora trichiliae (U. Braun) U. Braun (2002)
- Pseudocercospora trichiliae-hirtae U. Braun & Urtiaga (2013)
- Pseudocercospora trichodesmatis (Govindu & Thirum.) U. Braun & Crous (2003)
- Pseudocercospora trichogena Guatim., R.W. Barreto & Crous (2016)
- Pseudocercospora trichophila (F. Stevens) Deighton (1976)
- Pseudocercospora trichostigmatis (F. Stevens) Deighton (1976)
- Pseudocercospora trichoxanthidicola Kamal, A.N. Rai & A.S. Moses (1991)
- Pseudocercospora triloba (Chupp) U. Braun & Crous (2003)
- Pseudocercospora trinidadensis (F. Stevens & Solheim) Crous, U. Braun & Alfenas (1999)
- Pseudocercospora triplaridis U. Braun & Urtiaga (2008)
- Pseudocercospora triumfettae (Syd.) Deighton (1976)
- Pseudocercospora triumfettigena (J.M. Yen & Gilles) Deighton (1976)
- Pseudocercospora tuberculans (Ellis & Everh.) U. Braun (1999)
- Pseudocercospora tumulosa (Carnegie & Beilharz) Carnegie & Crous (2019)
- Pseudocercospora turnerae (Ellis & Everh.) Deighton (1976)
- Pseudocercospora turnericola (Syd. & P. Syd.) U. Braun & F.O. Freire (2003)
- Pseudocercospora tylophoricola U. Braun, Bagyan. & Jagad. (1992)

== U ==
- Pseudocercospora ubajarensis U. Braun & F.O. Freire (2004)
- Pseudocercospora ubi (Racib.) Deighton (1976)
- Pseudocercospora ubicola (J.M. Yen) Deighton (1976)
- Pseudocercospora udagawana (Katsuki) X.J. Liu & Y.L. Guo (1989)
- Pseudocercospora ulei (Henn.) B.T. Hora & Mizubuti (2013)
- Pseudocercospora ulmifoliae (Obreg.-Bot.) U. Braun & Crous (2003)
- Pseudocercospora unguis-cati (Speg.) U. Braun (1994)
- Pseudocercospora unicolor (Sacc. & Penz.) P.M. Kirk (1983)
- Pseudocercospora urariae Sawada ex Deighton (1976)
- Pseudocercospora urariae-hamosae Kamal (2010)
- Pseudocercospora urariae-pictae H.S.G. Rao, S. Narayan & Poonam Srivast. (1997)
- Pseudocercospora urariarum (A.K. Kar & M. Mandal) U. Braun & Crous (2003)
- Pseudocercospora urariicola Deighton (1987)
- Pseudocercospora urariigena U. Braun (2014)
- Pseudocercospora urenae (Viégas & Chupp) A. Hern.-Gut. & Dianese (1996)
- Pseudocercospora urerae U. Braun & Urtiaga (2010)
- Pseudocercospora uromycestri (Pollack) U. Braun & Crous (2003)
- Pseudocercospora urticacearum R.K. Verma & Kamal (1989)
- Pseudocercospora usteriana (Speg.) U. Braun (1996)
- Pseudocercospora uwebrauniana A. Hern.-Gut. & Dianese (2013)

== V ==
- Pseudocercospora vaccinii (Katsuki & Tak. Kobay.) C. Nakash. & Tak. Kobay. (2000)
- Pseudocercospora vaccinii-virgati U. Braun & Crous (2003)
- Pseudocercospora valerianae (Solheim) U. Braun (1993)
- Pseudocercospora vanieriae (Chupp & Linder) U. Braun & Crous (2003)
- Pseudocercospora vanuatuensis U. Braun & McKenzie (1999)
- Pseudocercospora varia (Peck) J.K. Bai & M.Y. Cheng (1992)
- Pseudocercospora variabilis U. Braun & F.O. Freire (2004)
- Pseudocercospora variicolor (G. Winter) Y.L. Guo & X.J. Liu (1993)
- Pseudocercospora vassobiae Meir. Silva, R.W. Barreto & Crous (2016)
- Pseudocercospora vataireae (Henn.) U. Braun & F.O. Freire (2003)
- Pseudocercospora velutina (Ellis & Kellerm.) U. Braun & Crous (2003)
- Pseudocercospora velutinomaculans U. Braun & F.O. Freire (2003)
- Pseudocercospora venezuelae (Chupp) Deighton (1976)
- Pseudocercospora verbenacearum S. Shrivast., N. Verma & A.N. Rai (2010)
- Pseudocercospora vernoniacearum D.N. Shukla, A.K. Singh, P. Kumar & Kamal (1982)
- Pseudocercospora vestitae (T.S. Ramakr.) Deighton (1976)
- Pseudocercospora vexillatae (J.M. Yen) U. Braun (1999)
- Pseudocercospora viburni U. Braun (1992)
- Pseudocercospora viburnicola U. Braun (2015)
- Pseudocercospora viburni-cylindrici U. Braun (1992)
- Pseudocercospora viburni-erosi U. Braun & H.D. Shin (2015)
- Pseudocercospora viburnigena U. Braun & Crous (2002)
- Pseudocercospora viburni-nudi U. Braun (2015)
- Pseudocercospora vicosae Firmino & O.L. Pereira (2013)
- Pseudocercospora vignae Y.J. Chen & K.D. Hyde (2022)
- Pseudocercospora vignae-reticulatae Deighton (1976)
- Pseudocercospora vignicola (J.M. Yen, A.K. Kar & B.K. Das) U. Braun (1999)
- Pseudocercospora vignigena J.M. Yen, A.K. Kar & B.K. Das (1982)
- Pseudocercospora violae Deighton (1987)
- Pseudocercospora violamaculans (Fukui) C. Nakash. & Tak. Kobay. (2002)
- Pseudocercospora violicola X.J. Liu & Y.L. Guo (1987)
- Pseudocercospora virgiliae U. Braun & C.F. Hill (2008)
- Pseudocercospora vismiae (Syd.) U. Braun & Crous (2003)
- Pseudocercospora vismiicola (Chupp) U. Braun & Crous (2003)
- Pseudocercospora viticicola (J.M. Yen & Lim) J.M. Yen (1980)
- Pseudocercospora viticigena J.M. Yen, A.K. Kar & B.K. Das (1982)
- Pseudocercospora viticis Sawada ex Goh & W.H. Hsieh (1989)
- Pseudocercospora viticis-quinatae (J.M. Yen) J.M. Yen (1979)
- Pseudocercospora vitigena J.M. Yen, A.K. Kar & B.K. Das (1982)
- Pseudocercospora vitis (Lév.) Speg. (1910)
- Pseudocercospora vulpinae (Ellis & Kellerm.) U. Braun (1997)

== W ==
- Pseudocercospora waltheriae (Thirum. & Chupp) Deighton (1976)
- Pseudocercospora warcupii Beilharz, Pascoe & Parbery (2002)
- Pseudocercospora wattakakae Bagyan., U. Braun & M.K. Moinuddin (2014)
- Pseudocercospora websteri (P.Rag. Rao, Manohar. & P.Rama Rao) U. Braun (2002)
- Pseudocercospora wedeliae (A.K. Kar & M. Mandal) Deighton (1976)
- Pseudocercospora weigelae (Ellis & Everh.) Deighton (1987)
- Pseudocercospora wellesiana (Chupp) X.J. Liu & Y.L. Guo (1993)
- Pseudocercospora wendlandiiphila Phengs., Chukeat., McKenzie, K.D. Hyde & U. Braun (2013)
- Pseudocercospora whalianensis (J.M. Yen & S.K. Sun) U. Braun & Crous (2003)
- Pseudocercospora wisteriicola (J.M. Yen) J.M. Yen (1979)
- Pseudocercospora withaniae (Syd. & P. Syd.) Deighton (1976)
- Pseudocercospora woodfordiigena U. Braun & Crous (2003)
- Pseudocercospora wrightiae (Thirum. & Chupp) Deighton (1976)
- Pseudocercospora wrightiicola (Satya) Deighton (1976)
- Pseudocercospora wuchienshiungiae Y.P. Tan, Bishop-Hurley & R.G. Shivas (2023)
- Pseudocercospora wulffiae Meir. Silva, R.W. Barreto & Crous (2016)
- Pseudocercospora wusaulaniae Y.P. Tan, Bishop-Hurley & R.G. Shivas (2023)

== X ==
- Pseudocercospora xanthocercidis Crous, U. Braun & A. Wood (2012)
- Pseudocercospora xanthorhizae U. Braun & Crous (2005)
- Pseudocercospora xenoannonicola Crous & Bench. (2001)
- Pseudocercospora xenosyzygiicola Crous (1999)
- Pseudocercospora xeromphidicola Kamal, P. Kumar, R.P. Singh & D.N. Shukla (1980)
- Pseudocercospora xeromphina H.S. Rao, A.S. Moses & P.N. Singh (1996)
- Pseudocercospora xerophytae B. Sutton (1993)
- Pseudocercospora xiancao R. Kirschner (2020)
- Pseudocercospora ximeniae Bagyan. & U. Braun (1992)
- Pseudocercospora xylopiae Meir. Silva, R.W. Barreto & Crous (2016)

== Y ==
- Pseudocercospora yakushimensis (Togashi & Katsuki) C. Nakash. & Tak. Kobay. (2011)
- Pseudocercospora yeniana U. Braun & F.O. Freire (2004)
- Pseudocercospora yerbae (Speg.) U. Braun (2000)
- Pseudocercospora yoshinagiana (Chupp) U. Braun & Crous (2003)

== Z ==
- Pseudocercospora zambalesica (Petr.) U. Braun (1996)
- Pseudocercospora zanthoxyli (Cooke) Y.L. Guo & X.J. Liu (1991)
- Pseudocercospora zanthoxylicola Crous & U. Braun (2001)
- Pseudocercospora zehneriae (A.K. Kar & M. Mandal) U. Braun & Crous (2003)
- Pseudocercospora zelkovae X.J. Liu & Y.L. Guo (1993)
- Pseudocercospora zeyheriae (Henn.) Dianese, Furlan. & L.T.P. Santos (1999)
- Pseudocercospora zingiberis (Rathaiah) Deighton (1983)
- Pseudocercospora ziziphi (Petch) Crous & U. Braun (1996)
- Pseudocercospora ziziphicola (J.M. Yen) J.M. Yen (1979)
- Pseudocercospora ziziphina P.N. Singh, M.S. Tripathi, A.N. Singh bis & R.K. Chaudhary (1998)
- Pseudocercospora ziziphus-jujubae S.N. Tripathi, A.N. Rai & N.K. Verma (2012)
- Pseudocercospora zorniae (J.M. Yen & Gilles) Deighton (1976)
- Pseudocercospora zuelaniae U. Braun & Urtiaga (2013)
