= Pseudocercospora pandoreae =

Scientific classification
- Kingdom: Fungi
- Division: Ascomycota
- Class: Dothideomycetes
- Order: Capnodiales
- Family: Mycosphaerellaceae
- Genus: Pseudocercospora
- Species: P. pandoreae

Binomial name
- Pseudocercospora pandoreae Braun, Hill & Schubert

Species of fungus

Pseudocercospora pandoreae is a fungus.

It was originally found on the leaves of Pandorea pandorana (the wonga wonga vine) in northern New Zealand.
