= Pseudocercospora rhapisicola =

Scientific classification
- Domain: Eukaryota
- Kingdom: Fungi
- Division: Ascomycota
- Class: Dothideomycetes
- Order: Capnodiales
- Family: Mycosphaerellaceae
- Genus: Pseudocercospora
- Species: P. rhapisicola

Binomial name
- Pseudocercospora rhapisicola (Tominaga) Goh & W.H. Hsieh [as 'rhapiscola'], (1989)

Species of fungus

Pseudocercospora rhapisicola is a fungal plant pathogen infecting palms.
