= Pseudocercospora ocellata =

Scientific classification
- Kingdom: Fungi
- Division: Ascomycota
- Class: Dothideomycetes
- Order: Mycosphaerellales
- Family: Mycosphaerellaceae
- Genus: Pseudocercospora
- Species: P. ocellata

Binomial name
- Pseudocercospora ocellata (Deighton) Deighton

Synonyms
- Cercoseptoria ocellata Deighton; Cercospora theae Breda de Haan

Species of fungus

Pseudocercospora ocellata is a fungal plant pathogen that affects the tea plant (Camellia sinensis).
