= Pseudocercospora cannabina =

Scientific classification
- Kingdom: Fungi
- Division: Ascomycota
- Class: Dothideomycetes
- Order: Capnodiales
- Family: Mycosphaerellaceae
- Genus: Pseudocercospora
- Species: P. cannabina

Binomial name
- Pseudocercospora cannabina (Wakef.) Deighton, (1976)

Synonyms
- Cercospora cannabina Wakef., Bull. Misc. Inf., Kew(nos 9 & 10): 314 (1917)

Species of fungus

Pseudocercospora cannabina is a fungal plant pathogen infecting hemp. Cercospora cannabina was originally found on the leaves of Cannabis sativa in Uganda. Then in 1976, it was renamed as Pseudocercospora cannabina by mycologist Frederick Claude Deighton (1903-1992).
