= Pseudocercospora kaki =

Scientific classification
- Domain: Eukaryota
- Kingdom: Fungi
- Division: Ascomycota
- Class: Dothideomycetes
- Order: Capnodiales
- Family: Mycosphaerellaceae
- Genus: Pseudocercospora
- Species: P. kaki

Binomial name
- Pseudocercospora kaki Goh & W.H.Hsieh

Synonyms
- Cercospora kaki Ellis & Everhart

Species of fungus

Pseudocercospora kaki is a fungal plant pathogen, who causes leaf spot of persimmon. It was originally found on leaves of Diospyros kaki (Oriental persimmon) in Taiwan. Some examples of other host species are Diospyros hispida, Diospyros lotus (date-plum, Caucasian persimmon), Diospyros texana (Texas persimmon, Mexican persimmon), and Diospyros melanoxylon (Coromandel ebony).
