= Pseudocercospora purpurea =

Scientific classification
- Domain: Eukaryota
- Kingdom: Fungi
- Division: Ascomycota
- Class: Dothideomycetes
- Order: Capnodiales
- Family: Mycosphaerellaceae
- Genus: Pseudocercospora
- Species: P. purpurea

Binomial name
- Pseudocercospora purpurea (Cooke) Deighton, (1976)

Synonyms
- Cercospora purpurea Cooke, Grevillea 7 (no. 41): 34 (1878)

Species of fungus

Pseudocercospora purpurea is a fungal plant pathogen that causes a leaf spot on the avocado. Species Cercospora purpurea was originally found on the leaves of Persea species in Georgia, USA in 1878. before the species was transferred to the Pseudocercospora genus in 1976.

It is also found in New Zealand and Australia, and Tolima, Colombia.

It is also found in Mexico, Martinique, Cameroon, South Africa and in the French West Indies (Gustafson, 1976; Willis and Mavuso, 2007; Everett and Siebert, 2018). In Mexico, it had become the second most common disease in avocados (Turu, 1969). In South Africa, black spots on the leaves causing crop losses of up to 69% have been reported, in fruits used for export from orchards planted in a highly susceptible cultivar without suitable disease management (Darvas et al., 1987; Crous and Braun, 2003).

It can cause significant losses (up to 48%) in commercial avocado production in Columbia by causing poor fruit quality and making fruits unacceptable for export (Lonsdale, 1991; Reina-Noreña et al., 2015).

The symptoms of this disease can be found in leaves, fruit, and stems during all parts of the growth stages. Small angular lesions are seen first, approximately 2.5 mm in diameter. They have a brown to purple coloration which is surrounded by a yellowish halo. As the disease progresses, the spots on the fruit begin to sink (into the skin), forming cracks without causing internal damage (Darvas, 1982; Dann et al., 2013). These cracks, become target entry points for other pathogens, such as fungi (e.g., Colletotrichum gloeosporioides) that cause anthracnose (cankers) (Tamayo, 2004).

The spread of the fungal spores can be helped by wind, rain, and insects. High relative humidity and high temperatures also help in the development and spread of the pathogen (Darvas et al., 1987). Usually, the fungus can remain dormant in the leaves for a period of about three months, becoming a source of inoculum for the infection of new fruits (Darvas, 1982).
