= Pseudocercospora fuligena =

Scientific classification
- Domain: Eukaryota
- Kingdom: Fungi
- Division: Ascomycota
- Class: Dothideomycetes
- Order: Capnodiales
- Family: Mycosphaerellaceae
- Genus: Pseudocercospora
- Species: P. fuligena

Binomial name
- Pseudocercospora fuligena (Roldan) Deighton, (1976)

Synonyms
- Cercospora fuligena Roldan, (1938)

Species of fungus

Pseudocercospora fuligena is a fungal plant pathogen infecting tomatoes. It is the cause of the fungal disease black leaf mold. The fungus was first described in the Philippines in 1938 and has since been reported in numerous countries throughout the tropics and subtropics. It was reported in the United States in 1974, initially in Florida, and has since been reported in non-tropical regions including Ohio and North Carolina.

Black leaf mold causes pale-yellow to light-green spots on infected leaves which eventually enlarge and coalesce. The leaves then wilt; infected tomato plants have smaller or fewer fruits. The losses are estimated to be up to 30%.
