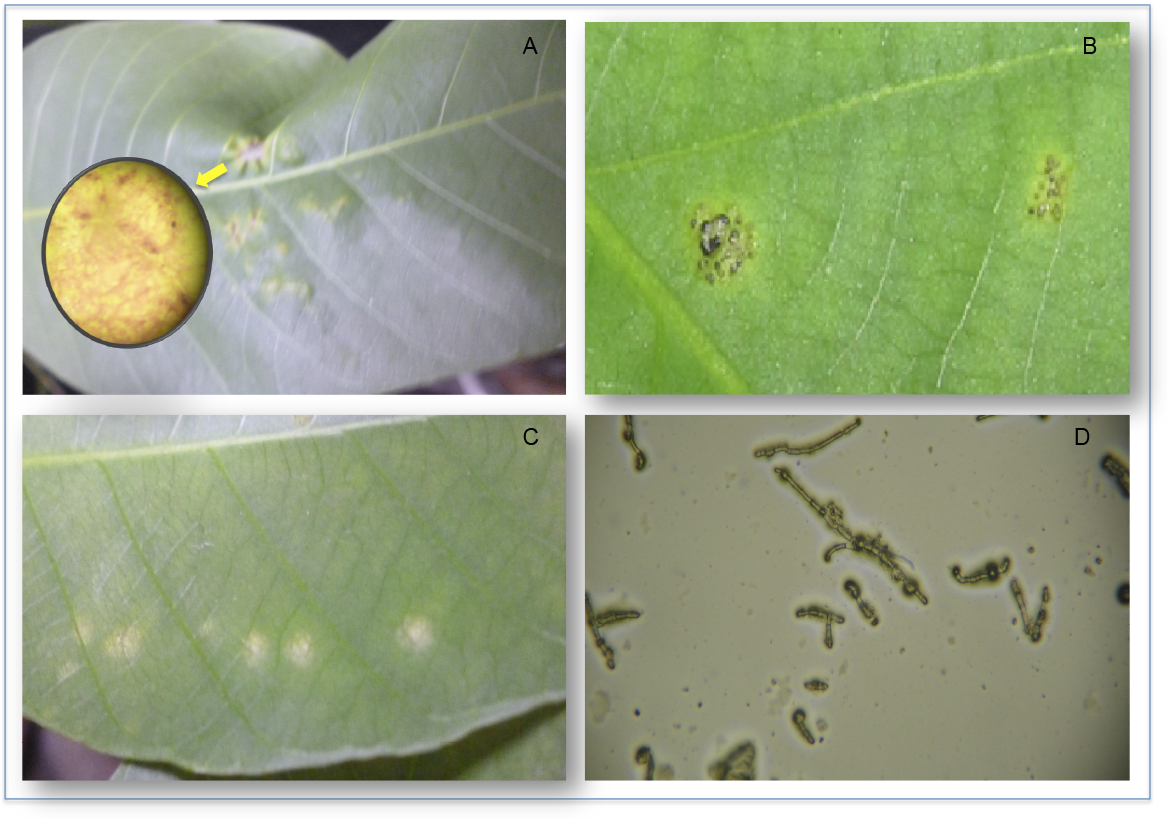
- Effects of Pseudocercospora ulei on Hevea brasiliensis

Scientific classification
- Kingdom: Fungi
- Division: Ascomycota
- Class: Dothideomycetes
- Order: Capnodiales
- Family: Mycosphaerellaceae
- Genus: Pseudocercospora
- Species: P. ulei

Binomial name
- Pseudocercospora ulei (Henn.) B.T. Hora & Mizubuti, 2013

Synonyms
- Aposphaeria ulei Henn., Notizbl. Königl. bot. Gart. Museum Berlin 4(no. 34): 135 (1904); Dothidella ulei Henn., Notizbl. Königl. bot. Gart. Museum Berlin 4(no. 34): 134 (1904); Fusicladium macrosporum J. Kuijper, Rec. Trav. bot. Néerl. 8: 374 (1911); Fusicladium heveae K. Schub. & U. Braun, in Crous & Braun, CBS Diversity Ser. (Utrecht) 1: 481 (2003); Melanopsammopsis ulei (Henn.) Stahel, Bull. Dep. Landb. Suriname 34: 111 (1917); Microcyclus ulei (Henn.) Arx, in Müller & von Arx, Beitr. Kryptfl. Schweiz 11(no. 2): 373 (1962)

= Pseudocercospora ulei =

Species of fungus

Pseudocercospora ulei is a fungal plant pathogen infecting rubber trees (Hevea brasiliensis and other members of the genus). The disease is called South American leaf blight (SALB) and is the reason that rubber tree plantations such as Fordlândia fail in the New World. Under its synonym Microcyclus ulei it has been recognized as a potentially catastrophic threat to the world economy, as there is currently no existing fungicide or treatment. Its genome has been sequenced.
