= Pseudocercospora puderi =

Scientific classification
- Domain: Eukaryota
- Kingdom: Fungi
- Division: Ascomycota
- Class: Dothideomycetes
- Order: Capnodiales
- Family: Mycosphaerellaceae
- Genus: Pseudocercospora
- Species: P. puderi

Binomial name
- Pseudocercospora puderi B.H. Davis ex Deighton, (1976)

Species of fungus

Pseudocercospora puderi is a fungal plant pathogen infecting roses, including Rosa gallica. It was originally found in Florida, USA.

It produces sub-orbicular or irregular and angular leaf spots, from 2 to 5 mm wide. These are usually brown or grey-brown.
