= Pseudocercospora gunnerae =

Scientific classification
- Kingdom: Fungi
- Division: Ascomycota
- Class: Dothideomycetes
- Order: Capnodiales
- Family: Mycosphaerellaceae
- Genus: Pseudocercospora
- Species: P. gunnerae

Binomial name
- Pseudocercospora gunnerae Braun, Hill & Schubert, 2006

Species of fungus

Pseudocercospora gunnerae is a fungal plant pathogen. It was found originally on the leaves of Gunnera tinctoria in northern New Zealand.
