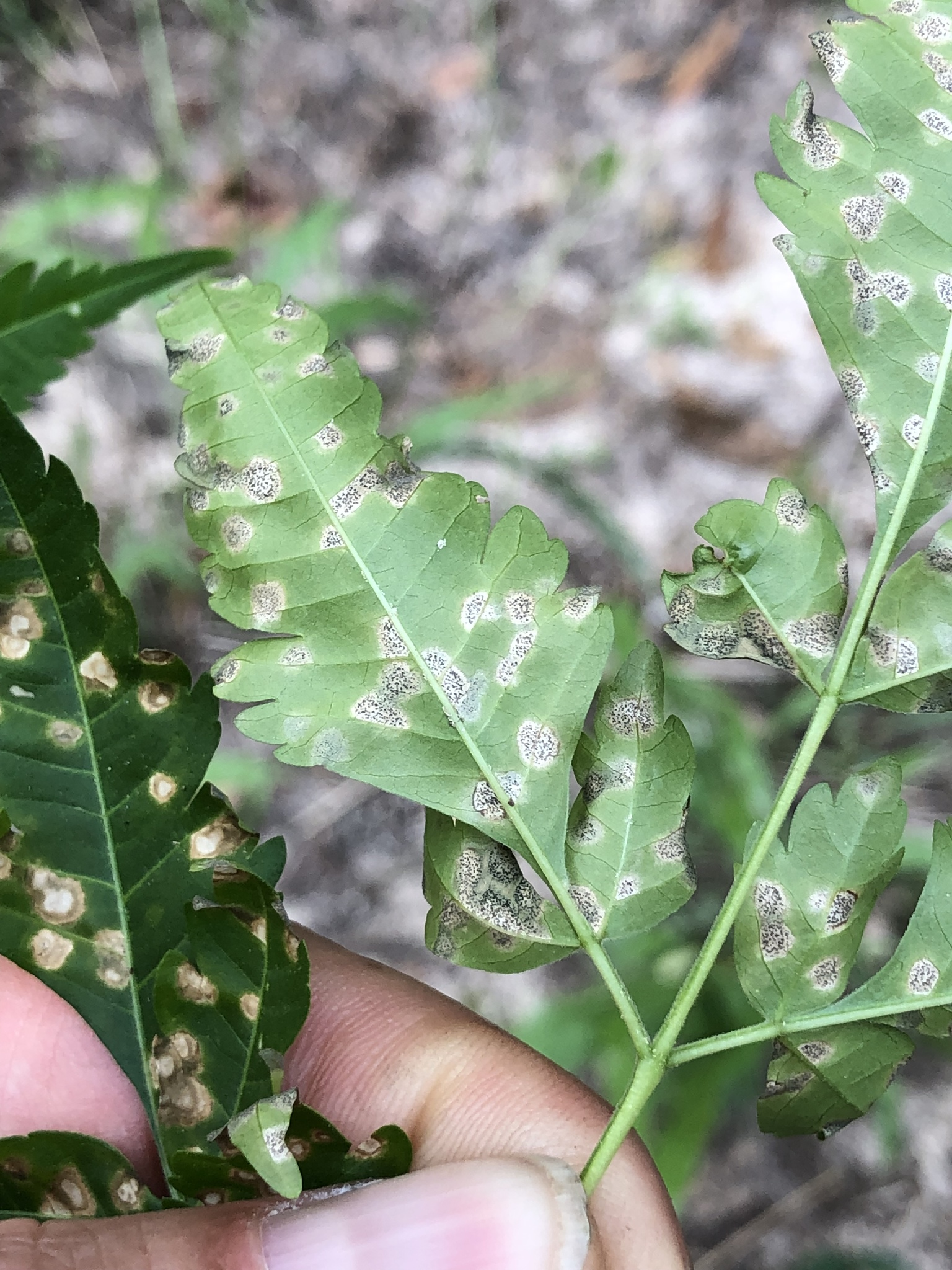

Scientific classification
- Domain: Eukaryota
- Kingdom: Fungi
- Division: Ascomycota
- Class: Dothideomycetes
- Order: Capnodiales
- Family: Mycosphaerellaceae
- Genus: Pseudocercospora
- Species: P. subsessilis

Binomial name
- Pseudocercospora subsessilis (Syd. & P. Syd.) Deighton, (1976)

Synonyms
- Cercospora subsessilis Syd. & P. Syd., Annls mycol. 11(4): 329 (1913); Cercosporina subsessilis (Syd. & P. Syd.) Sacc., in Trotter, Syll. fung. (Abellini) 25: 911 (1931); Cercospora subsessilis var. azadirachtae R.C. Srivast. [as 'azadirachtii'], Zentbl. Bakt. ParasitKde, Abt. II 135(6): 559 (1980)

= Pseudocercospora subsessilis =

Species of fungus

Pseudocercospora subsessilis is a fungal plant pathogen infecting chinaberry tree (Melia azedarach). It is widespread in tropical and subtropical areas on host species of the genera Azadirachta and Swietenia.

It was originally published as Cercospora subsessilis in 1913 and found on the leaves of the chinaberry tree in Tamil Nadu, India. Before the species was transferred to the Pseudocercospora genus.

The fungal leaf spots can amass to blight the entire leaf and were also capable of rapidly defoliating whole trees in late September.

The disease has been reported in several other Asian countries as well as in Cuba and the United States.

== Distribution ==
It is found in Burma, Cuba, Hong Kong, India, Jamaica, Japan, China, Nepal, Palestine, Philippines, San Domingo, Sierra Leone, Sri Lanka, Sudan, Taiwan, United States and Venezuela. It was later found in Korea, on ornamental planted chinaberry trees.
