= Pseudocercospora theae =

Scientific classification
- Domain: Eukaryota
- Kingdom: Fungi
- Division: Ascomycota
- Class: Dothideomycetes
- Order: Capnodiales
- Family: Mycosphaerellaceae
- Genus: Pseudocercospora
- Species: P. theae

Binomial name
- Pseudocercospora theae (Cavara) Deighton, (1987)

Synonyms
- Cercoseptoria theae (Cavara) Curzi, Boll. R. Staz. Patalog. Veget. Roma, N.S. 9: 385 (1929); Rhabdospora theae (Cavara) Kuntze, Revis. gen. pl. (Leipzig) 3(3): 514 (1898); Septoria theae Cavara, Revue mycol., Toulouse 11(no. 44): 190 (1889)

Species of fungus

Pseudocercospora theae is a fungal plant pathogen infecting tea. It was originally found on the fallen leaves of Thea viridis (synonym of Camellia sinensis) in Italy.
