= Pseudocercospora mali =

Scientific classification
- Kingdom: Fungi
- Division: Ascomycota
- Class: Dothideomycetes
- Order: Capnodiales
- Family: Mycosphaerellaceae
- Genus: Pseudocercospora
- Species: P. mali

Binomial name
- Pseudocercospora mali (Ellis & Everh.) Deighton, (1976)

Synonyms
- Cercospora mali Ellis & Everh., J. Mycol. 4(11): 116 (1888)

Species of fungus

Pseudocercospora mali is a fungal plant pathogen infecting Apple trees. It was originally found on the living leaves of Pyrus malus in Louisiana, USA.

It has also been found on Malus sieboldii (crabapple trees) in Japan.
