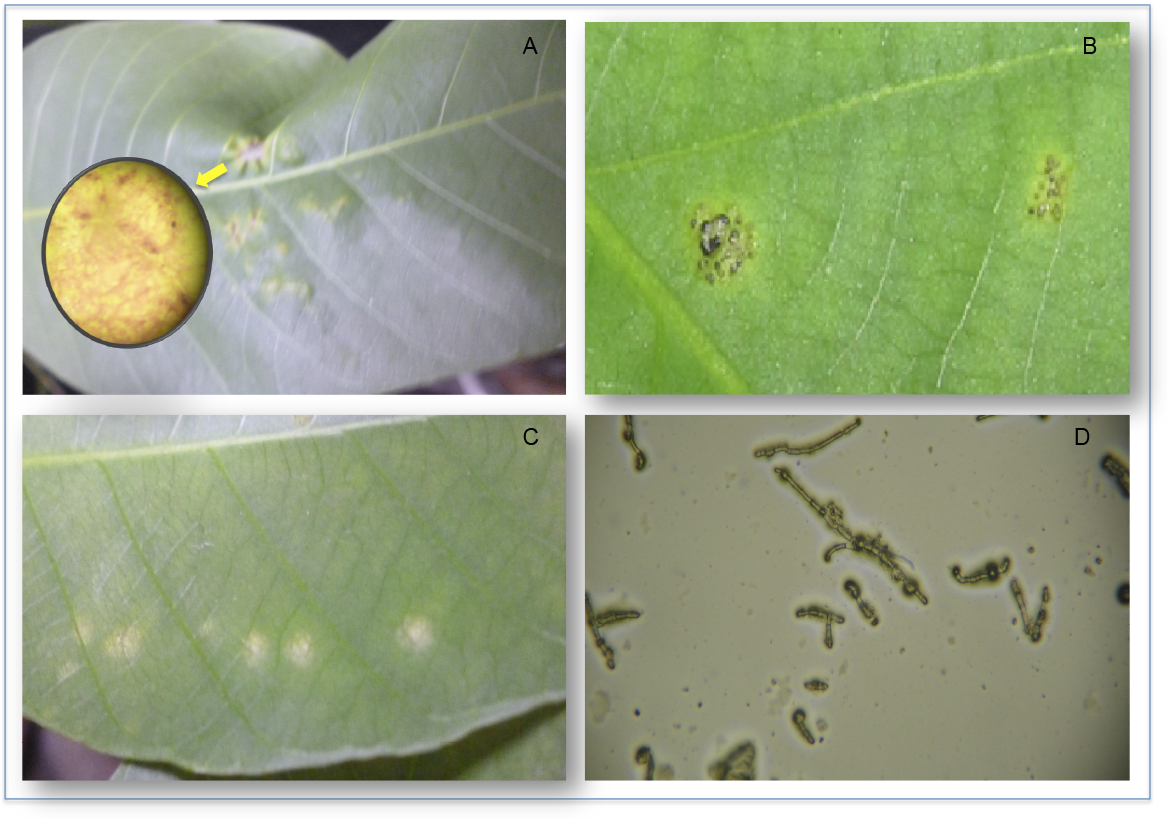
- Signs and symptoms caused by Pseudocercospora ulei (syn Microcyclus ulei) in Hevea brasiliensis leaflets. (A) Leaf deformation and sporulation of the GCL012 isolate 7 d post inoculation in RRIM 600. (B) Leaf showing the formation of stromatic structures of the isolate GCL012 at 24 dpi on RRIM 600. (C) A leaf of the clone FX 3864 showing the formation of chlorotic areas at 10 d post inoculation. (D) Germinating conidia of the GCL012 isolate. The germ tube can be observed (450X)

Scientific classification
- Domain: Eukaryota
- Kingdom: Fungi
- Division: Ascomycota
- Class: Dothideomycetes
- Order: Capnodiales
- Family: Mycosphaerellaceae
- Genus: Pseudocercospora; Speg. (1910)

Type species
- Pseudocercospora vitis (Lév.) Speg. (1910)

= Pseudocercospora =

Genus of fungi

Pseudocercospora is a genus of ascomycete fungi. An anamorphic version of the genus Mycosphaerella, Pseudocercospora species are plant pathogens, including the causal agent of the so-called South American leaf blight of the rubber tree. The widely distributed genus is concentrated predominantly in tropical regions. Pseudocercospora was circumscribed by Italian-Argentinian botanist Carlos Luigi Spegazzini in 1910.

== Species ==
As of 5 September 2023, the GBIF lists up to 1,540 species, while Species Fungorum lists about 1,517 species (out of 1,660 records). Over 1000 species are accepted by Wijayawardene et al. 2020.

=== Selected species ===
- Pseudocercospora cannabinaa
- Pseudocercospora fuligena
- Pseudocercospora gunnerae
- Pseudocercospora kaki
- Pseudocercospora lophostemonicola
- Pseudocercospora mali
- Pseudocercospora musae
- Pseudocercospora puderi
- Pseudocercospora purpurea
- Pseudocercospora rhapisicola
- Pseudocercospora subsessilis
- Pseudocercospora theae
- Pseudocercospora ulei (formerly Microcyclus ulei)
- Pseudocercospora vitis
