= Cercospora vicosae =

Scientific classification
- Kingdom: Fungi
- Division: Ascomycota
- Class: Dothideomycetes
- Order: Mycosphaerellales
- Family: Mycosphaerellaceae
- Genus: Cercospora
- Species: C. vicosae

Binomial name
- Cercospora vicosae A.S. Mull. & Chupp [as 'viçosae'], (1935)

Species of fungus

Cercospora vicosae is a fungal plant pathogen. It causes leaf spot on cassava.
