= Cercospora mangiferae =

Scientific classification
- Kingdom: Fungi
- Division: Ascomycota
- Class: Dothideomycetes
- Order: Mycosphaerellales
- Family: Mycosphaerellaceae
- Genus: Cercospora
- Species: C. mangiferae

Binomial name
- Cercospora mangiferae Koord., (1907)

Synonyms
- Sciniatosporium mangiferae (Koord.) E.B.G. Jones, (1971); Scolecostigmina mangiferae (Koord.) U. Braun & Mouch., (1999); Stigmina mangiferae (Koord.) M.B. Ellis, (1959)

Species of fungus

Cercospora mangiferae is a species of fungus that causes leaf spot disease on mango trees. It belongs to a group of fungi known as cercosporoid fungi, many of which are plant pathogens that infect leaves and reduce crop health.

The fungus has been reported from mango-growing regions in tropical climates, including Thailand. Infected leaves typically develop small dark lesions or spots, which may enlarge and merge under favorable environmental conditions. Severe infections can reduce the photosynthetic area of leaves and may affect plant vigor.

Researchers distinguish C. mangiferae from related fungi using both microscopic features and sequence analysis. Characteristics such as the shape and size of its spore-producing structures, together with genetic data from several locations on the organism’s genome, are used to confirm its identity and relationship to other cercosporoid species.
