= Cercospora apiicola =

Scientific classification
- Kingdom: Fungi
- Division: Ascomycota
- Class: Dothideomycetes
- Order: Capnodiales
- Family: Mycosphaerellaceae
- Genus: Cercospora
- Species: C. apiicola

Binomial name
- Cercospora apiicola M.Groenewald, Crous & U.Braun, (2006)

Species of fungus

Cercospora apiicola is a fungal plant pathogen, who causes leaf spot on celery.
