= Cercospora hydrangeae =

Scientific classification
- Kingdom: Fungi
- Division: Ascomycota
- Class: Dothideomycetes
- Order: Mycosphaerellales
- Family: Mycosphaerellaceae
- Genus: Cercospora
- Species: C. hydrangeae

Binomial name
- Cercospora hydrangeae Ellis & Everhart

Species of fungus

Cercospora hydrangeae is a fungal plant pathogen that causes leaf spot on hydrangea.
