= Cercospora pulcherrima =

Scientific classification
- Kingdom: Fungi
- Division: Ascomycota
- Class: Dothideomycetes
- Order: Mycosphaerellales
- Family: Mycosphaerellaceae
- Genus: Cercospora
- Species: C. pulcherrima

Binomial name
- Cercospora pulcherrima Tharp, (1917)

Species of fungus

Cercospora pulcherrima is a fungal plant pathogen. It is one of the fungi that causes leaf spot.
