= Cercospora minima =

Scientific classification
- Kingdom: Fungi
- Division: Ascomycota
- Class: Dothideomycetes
- Order: Mycosphaerellales
- Family: Mycosphaerellaceae
- Genus: Cercospora
- Species: C. minima

Binomial name
- Cercospora minima Tracy & Earle, (1896)

Species of fungus

Cercospora minima is a fungal plant pathogen. In the European pear, it is the cause of the disease known as late leaf spot. The geographic distribution includes India, South America, and the south-eastern United States.
