= Cercospora apii f.sp. clerodendri =

Scientific classification
- Domain: Eukaryota
- Kingdom: Fungi
- Division: Ascomycota
- Class: Dothideomycetes
- Order: Capnodiales
- Family: Mycosphaerellaceae
- Genus: Cercospora
- Species: C. apii
- Forma specialis: C. a. f.sp. clerodendri

Trionomial name
- Cercospora apii f.sp. clerodendri Sobers & Martinéz, (1967)

Fungal plant pathogen

Cercospora apii f.sp. clerodendri is a fungal plant pathogen that causes leaf spot.
