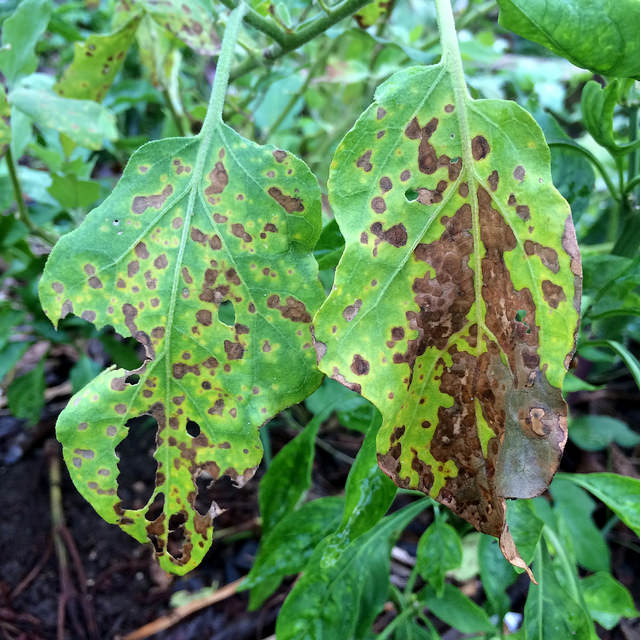

Scientific classification
- Kingdom: Fungi
- Division: Ascomycota
- Class: Dothideomycetes
- Order: Mycosphaerellales
- Family: Mycosphaerellaceae
- Genus: Cercospora
- Species: C. melongenae

Binomial name
- Cercospora melongenae Welles (1922)

Synonyms
- Corynespora melongenae

= Cercospora melongenae =

Fungal disease of eggplant leaves

Cercospora melongenae is a fungal plant pathogen that causes leaf spot on eggplant (Solanum melongenum). It is a deuteromycete fungus that is primarily confined to eggplant species. Some other host species are Solanum aethiopicum and Solanum incanum. This plant pathogen only attacks leaves of eggplants and not the fruit. It is fairly common among the fungi that infect community gardens and home gardens of eggplant. Generally speaking, Cercospora melongenae attacks all local varieties of eggplants, but is most severe on the Philippine eggplant and less parasitic on a Siamese variety.

== Signs and symptoms ==
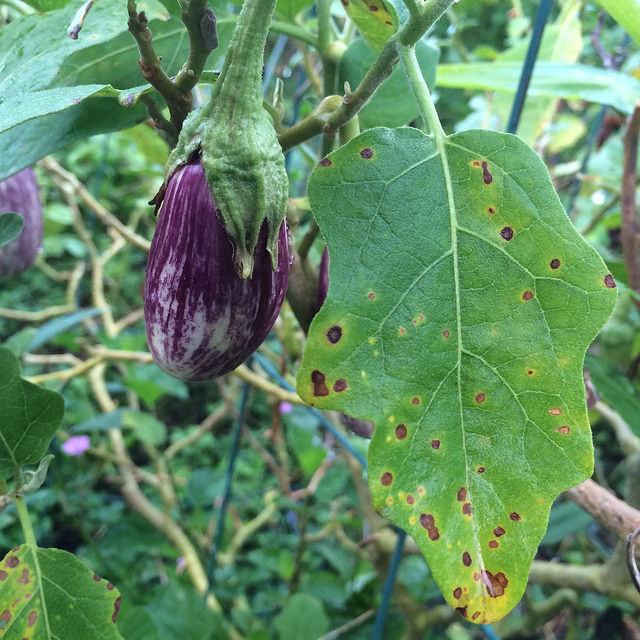
Cercospora leaf spot on eggplant in Hawai'i

Cercospora melongenae is found primarily in warm climates close to the equator. In the US it is prevalent in Hawaii, and could potentially be found in the southern Continental US. Symptoms begin to show on the underside of older, lower leaves first due to the proximity to the soil. They are the first leaves to receive the inoculum. Lesions can be found on leaves, stems and petioles. The lesions appear small and circular at first and later progress to angular and more irregular shapes. The lesions are usually 4-10mm in diameter, and have light to dark tan concentric spots. Spots appear on the upper leaf surface first and eventually progress to the lower side of the leaf. Upon observation in the field with a handheld scope, signs of conidiophores can be seen in the stomata of infected tissue. Conidiophores are typically mid-brown, and straight or slightly flexuous and septate. They are typically 30-150 microns long and 4-7 microns wide. Conidia can also sometimes be seen. Conidia of Cercospora melongenae typically have a truncate base with a somewhat thickened convex scar and a sub-acute apex. The conidia are typically 40-150 microns long and 3-4.5 microns wide, and of 4-14 septate. Later in the disease cycle excessive sporulation can be readily observed in the center of the lesions. Eventually the lesions will dry up and in some cases fall out. The fungi does not affect the fruit, however yield can be impacted due to loss of photosynthetic material.

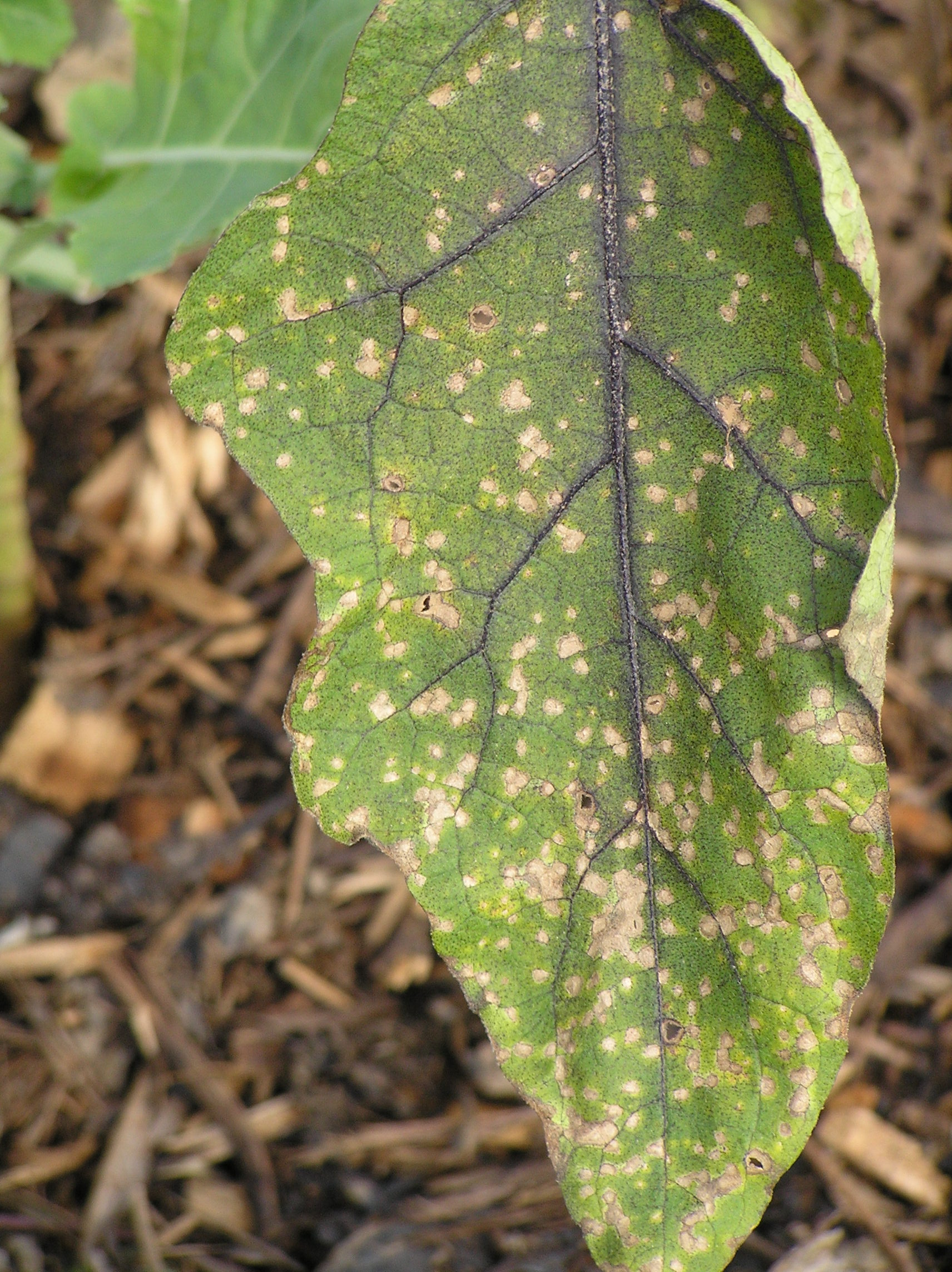
Lesions caused by Cercospora fungi on eggplant

== Disease cycle ==
Cercospora melongenae exists wholly in its asexual stage; even when grown in culture in the lab, no sexual stage is seen. This means that this disease has an imperfect life cycle, making it of the deuteromycota. Cercospora melongenae overwinters in conidiophores which asexually produce conidia. It survives the winter on lesions of previously infected fruit, plant debris, or simply in the soil. This fungus can survive up to a year in the soil. Conidia is released in the spring when the fungus is ready to infect its host, the eggplant. The conidia disperse by air or wind, or by rain-splash, and are able to infect a suitable host this way. Conidia infect an eggplant host by landing on the lower surface young leaves and entering the leaf through stomata or other natural openings of the plant or wounds on the plant. From infection, there appear to be visible lesions on the leaves. The germ tube of the fungus can enter both closed and open stomata. Multiple germ tubes from various conidia can enter the same stomata. This fungus has the best infection rates among young leaves and has a reduced infection rate of mature leaves. It is thought that the reduced infection rate of mature leaves is due to the saprophytic microflora on the leaves and the anti-fungal compounds produced by the mature leaf. This fungus produces secondary conidia within the same season; this furthers the disease cycle and allows the fungus to infect more plants. Mycelium rapidly develops. Under near perfect conditions, mycelium can develop within twelve hours of infection. The mycelium protects the next generation of conidia and ensures survival through the winter via conidiophores, and the cycle starts again the next season.

== Pathogenesis ==
Cercospora melongenae overwinters in soil or plant debris as conidiophores which then can be dispersed to the plant by rain splash, irrigation water, wind or mechanical transport. The inoculum, conidia, enter through the stomata of the leaves where they germinate and produce more conidia on conidiophores. The conidia must have water or moisture in the form of heavy dew in order to germinate and therefore penetrate the leaf via. the stomata or other natural openings or wounds on the plant. Fungi in the genus Cercospora produce the plant toxin cercosporin, which causes the leaf spot appearance. Cercosporin is a photosensitizing perylenequinone plant toxin that absorbs light energy and converts it into a highly activated state. This activated state then reacts with molecular oxygen to form activated oxygen, which in turn reacts with proteins, lipids, and nucleic acids causing damage or cell death. The fungal spores are not harmed by the production of this toxin because they produce pyridoxine which neutralizes the reaction. While the toxin damages the host cells, conidia is produced and is able to infect the current host or spread to other susceptible hosts in the area.

== Environment ==
Cercospora melongenae enters through breaks in the plant surface on the young leaf host of eggplants, typically through lesions caused by the fungi. Fruiting bodies of the fungus are overall larger when the fungus is able to proliferate during a heavy rain period versus a dry season. The fungus favors wet or moist leaves and high relative humidity for optimal infection. A conducive environment for this fungus is one that is moist and wet, with a fair amount of wind and rain splash for optimal dispersal. This fungi produces larger fruiting structures during a rainy season than during a dry season, indicating the need for a moist or wet environment. Essentially, the amount of moisture in the air is correlated with the sizes of the fruiting structures. In almost all cases and especially in severe cases, signs and symptoms of Cercospora melongenae have already appeared by the beginning of the dry season (or the end of the wet or rainy season). Because Cercospora melongenae is a polycyclic disease and heavily dependent on a moist or wet environment, an extremely heavy rainy season is conducive for larger and greater conidia production and dispersal. What is interesting to note is that in less susceptible eggplant varieties, such as the Siamese variety, signs and symptoms of Cercospora melongenae can be unseen and not appear until at least four weeks after the start of the dry season.

== Control and management ==
=== Prevention ===
Proper growing methods, crop rotation, and sanitary procedures are the most effective method of prevention of Cercospora melongenae infection.

Leaf spot is a common disease found in home gardens, and preventing its spread can be done by preventing excessive moisture and humidity accumulation. Ways to reduce relative humidity and dampness include: weed control, irrigating in the morning, avoiding overhead sprinkler irrigation, increasing aeration at base of plants, using covers to minimize dampness.

Crop rotation is also important, as well as the inclusion of diverse intercropping with many other vegetables. Being crop-specific, diversity will help slow down the spread of Cercospora melongenae. Sanitation, such as the use of disease free plants, and the removal of infected plant debris is critical in preventing future infestation. This disease may live in plant debris or soil for at least one year, so burning, or throwing away any infected matter is very important.

=== Chemical control ===
There are many fungicides which control Cercospora melongenae including Oils with no added pesticides, and some with. The most common recommended is a Bordeaux mixture, which only needs to be applied once every two weeks. Neem oil, Octanoic acid and copper salt solutions, and various concentrations of Chlorothalonil are all recommended fungicides, as well. Carefully read labels, and laws regarding application regiments and practices.

Fungicides for C. melongenae which are registered in Hawai'i and many other U.S states are:

- Bravo Ultrex® Agricultural Fungicide - Bravo Weather Stik® Agricultural Fungicide - Bonide Liquid Copper Fungicide Concentrate - Bonide Liquid Copper Fungicide Ready to Use - Bonide Neem Oil Fungicide · Miticide · Insecticide Concentrate - Garden Safe® Brand Neem Oil Extract Concentrate - Natural Guard® Neem - Natural Guard® Copper Soap Liquid Fungicide - Serenade® Garden Disease Control Concentrate - Serenade® Garden Disease Control Ready to Spray

== Environmental importance ==
Eggplant is a commonly grown vegetable in home gardens across the United States with an estimated economic value of $1.2 million USD in 1999, and 5,009 acres harvested in 2012.

Because of common garden growing mistakes, Cercospora leaf spot on eggplant is one of the most common fungal infections of eggplant. It is seen to have severe significance on eggplant produce in the Philippines and other southeast Asian tropical islands. The genus Cercospora may reduce the photosynthetic area of mature leaves by over 75%, and close to 30% in young leaves. While listed as a minor Eggplant Disease in the Philippine Journal of Agriculture, it is an easily avoidable one with proper care and management.
