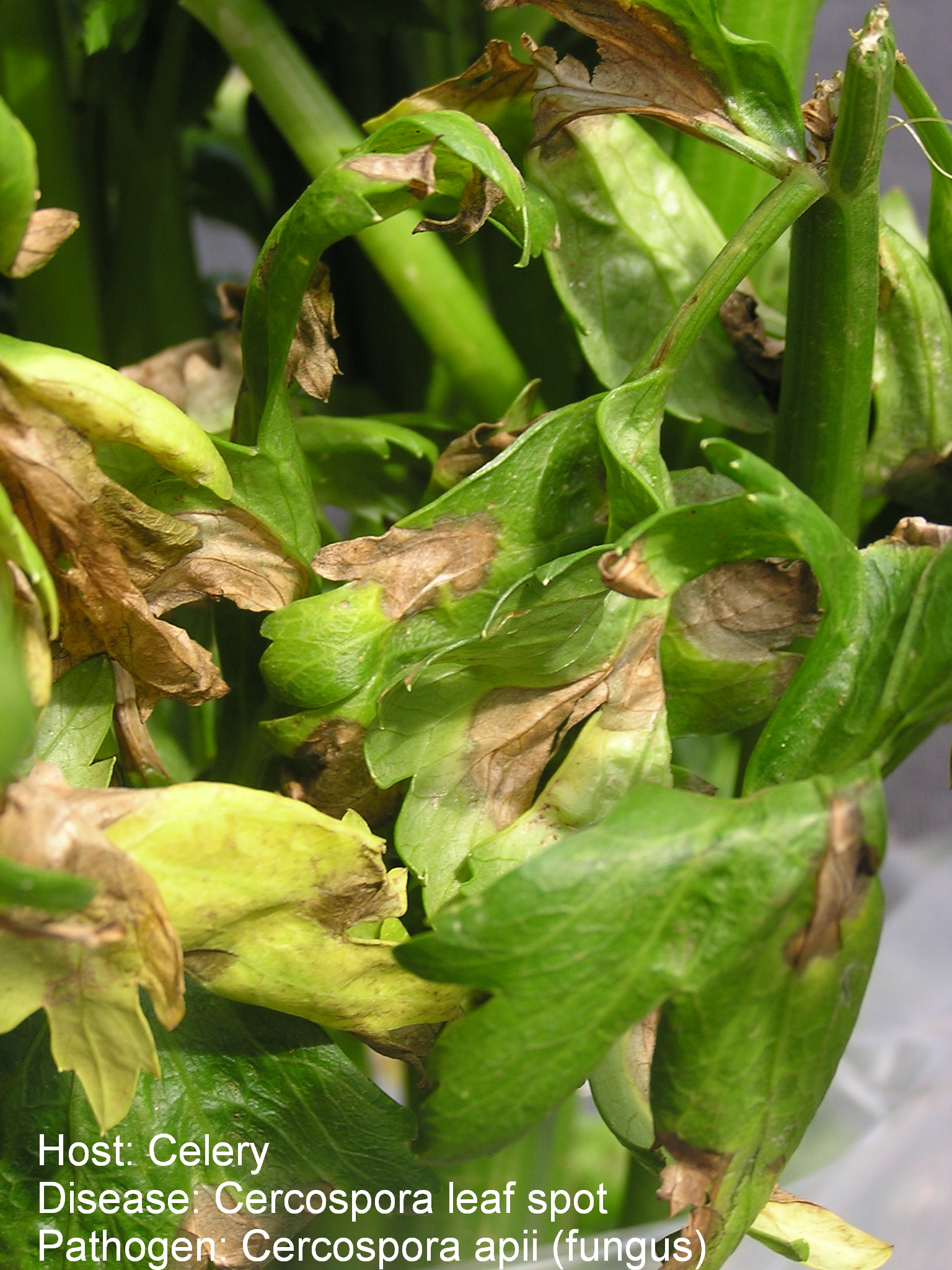
- Cercospora leaf spot of celery caused by Cercospora apii.

Scientific classification
- Kingdom: Fungi
- Division: Ascomycota
- Class: Dothideomycetes
- Order: Capnodiales
- Family: Mycosphaerellaceae
- Genus: Cercospora
- Species: C. apii

Binomial name
- Cercospora apii Fresen.,(1863)

= Cercospora apii =

Species of fungus

Cercospora apii is a fungal plant pathogen, who causes leaf spot on celery, and found on other plants, including Impatiens. Since the genus Cercospora is one of the largest and most heterogeneous genera of hyphomycetes, numerous species described from diverse hosts and locations are morphologically indistinguishable from C. apii and subsequently are referred to as C. apii sensu lato.

== See also ==
- Cercospora apii f.sp. clerodendri
