= Cercospora liquidambaris =

Scientific classification
- Kingdom: Fungi
- Division: Ascomycota
- Class: Dothideomycetes
- Order: Mycosphaerellales
- Family: Mycosphaerellaceae
- Genus: Cercospora
- Species: C. liquidambaris

Binomial name
- Cercospora liquidambaris G.F. Atk.

Species of fungus

Cercospora liquidambaris is a fungal plant pathogen in the southeastern United States which causes a leaf spot disease in Loropetalum chinense, commonly known as the Chinese fringe flower. The fungus was mistakenly confused with Pseudocercospora liquidambaris, which infects Liquidambar formosana, but has been reclassified as C. liquidambaris until its phylogenic relationships are more clearly established.
