= Cercospora pisa-sativae =

Scientific classification
- Kingdom: Fungi
- Division: Ascomycota
- Class: Dothideomycetes
- Order: Mycosphaerellales
- Family: Mycosphaerellaceae
- Genus: Cercospora
- Species: C. pisa-sativae

Binomial name
- Cercospora pisa-sativae J.A. Stev. [as 'pisa-sativae'], (1919)

Species of fungus

Cercospora pisa-sativae is a species of ascomycete fungus in the genus Cercospora (family Mycosphaerellaceae) that functions as a plant pathogen, primarily causing leaf spot disease on pea (Pisum sativum) plants in the family Fabaceae.
