= Cercospora solani-tuberosi =

Scientific classification
- Kingdom: Fungi
- Division: Ascomycota
- Class: Dothideomycetes
- Order: Mycosphaerellales
- Family: Mycosphaerellaceae
- Genus: Cercospora
- Species: C. solani-tuberosi

Binomial name
- Cercospora solani-tuberosi Thirum. (1953)

Species of fungus

Cercospora solani-tuberosi is a fungal plant pathogen.
