= Cercospora medicaginis =

Scientific classification
- Domain: Eukaryota
- Kingdom: Fungi
- Division: Ascomycota
- Class: Dothideomycetes
- Order: Capnodiales
- Family: Mycosphaerellaceae
- Genus: Cercospora
- Species: C. medicaginis

Binomial name
- Cercospora medicaginis Ellis & Everh. (1891)

Synonyms
- Rostrella coffeae Zimm., (1900); Sphaeronaema fimbriatum (Ellis & Halst.) Sacc., (1892)

Species of fungus

Cercospora medicaginis is a fungal plant pathogen. It is a slow-growing pathogen found on Medicago species, which are widespread Tunisia.
