= Zymoseptoria passerinii =

Scientific classification
- Kingdom: Fungi
- Division: Ascomycota
- Class: Dothideomycetes
- Order: Capnodiales
- Family: Mycosphaerellaceae
- Genus: Zymoseptoria
- Species: Z. passerinii

Binomial name
- Zymoseptoria passerinii (Sacc.) Quaedvl. & Crous, 2011

Species of fungus

Zymoseptoria passerinii is a species of fungus belonging to the family Mycosphaerellaceae.

Synonym:

- Septoria passerinii Sacc.
