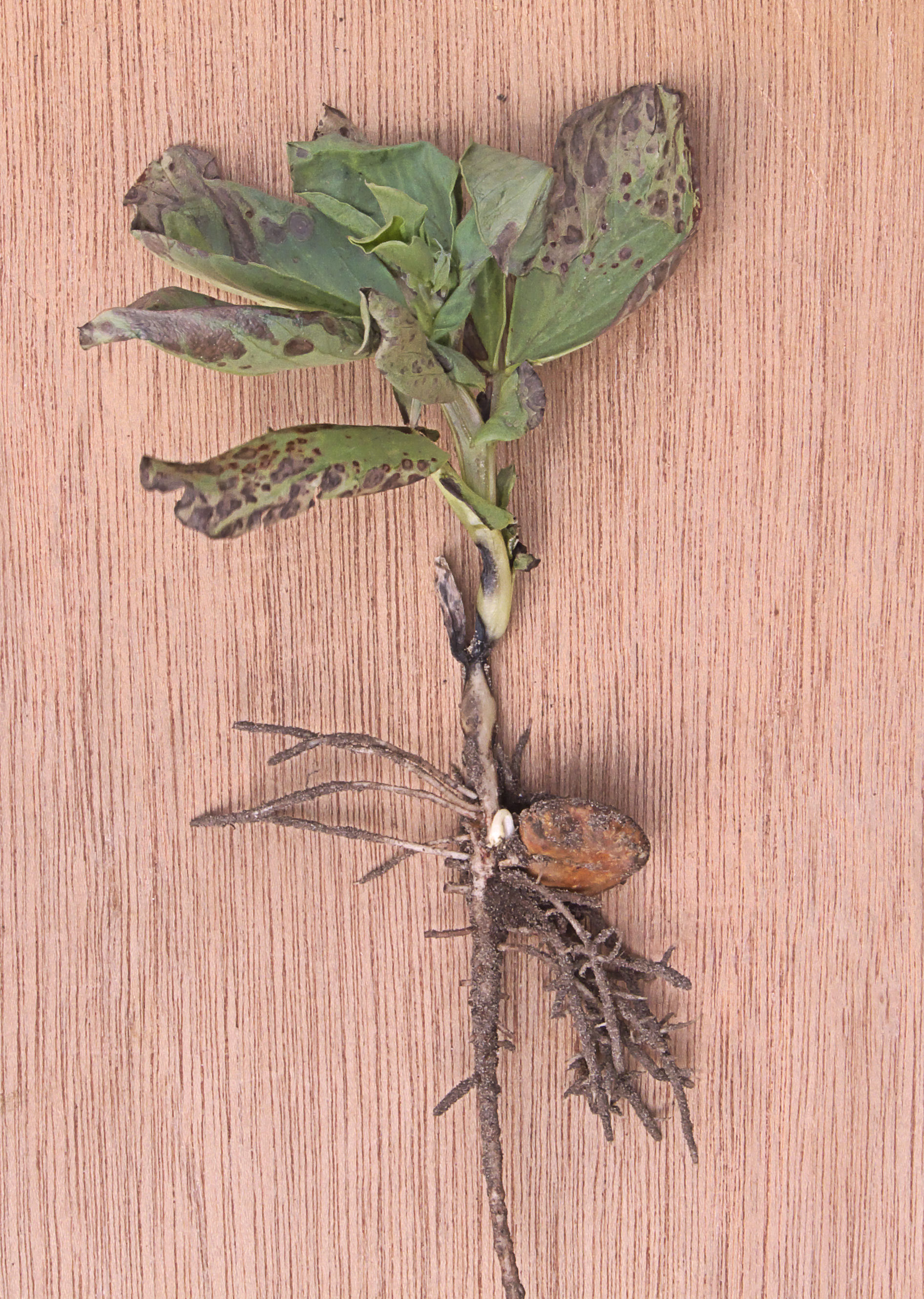

Scientific classification
- Kingdom: Fungi
- Division: Ascomycota
- Class: Dothideomycetes
- Order: Mycosphaerellales
- Family: Mycosphaerellaceae
- Genus: Cercospora
- Species: C. zonata

Binomial name
- Cercospora zonata G. Winter, (1883)

Synonyms
- Cercospora fabae Fautrey, (1891)

= Cercospora zonata =

Species of fungus

Cercospora zonata is a fungal plant pathogen.
