= Cercospora coryli =

Scientific classification
- Kingdom: Fungi
- Division: Ascomycota
- Class: Dothideomycetes
- Order: Mycosphaerellales
- Family: Mycosphaerellaceae
- Genus: Cercospora
- Species: C. coryli

Binomial name
- Cercospora coryli Montem., (1915)

Species of fungus

Cercospora coryli is a fungal plant pathogen.
