= Cercospora carotae =

Scientific classification
- Kingdom: Fungi
- Division: Ascomycota
- Class: Dothideomycetes
- Order: Mycosphaerellales
- Family: Mycosphaerellaceae
- Genus: Cercospora
- Species: C. carotae

Binomial name
- Cercospora carotae (Pass.) Kazn. & Siemaszko, (1929)

Synonyms
- Cercospora apii var. carotae Pass., (1889)

Species of fungus

Cercospora carotae is a fungal plant pathogen.
