= Cercospora gerberae =

Scientific classification
- Kingdom: Fungi
- Division: Ascomycota
- Class: Dothideomycetes
- Order: Capnodiales
- Family: Mycosphaerellaceae
- Genus: Cercospora
- Species: C. gerberae

Binomial name
- Cercospora gerberae Chupp & Viégas, (1945)

Species of fungus

Cercospora gerberae is a fungal plant pathogen that affects Gerbera.
