= Cercospora asparagi =

Scientific classification
- Kingdom: Fungi
- Division: Ascomycota
- Class: Dothideomycetes
- Order: Mycosphaerellales
- Family: Mycosphaerellaceae
- Genus: Cercospora
- Species: C. asparagi

Binomial name
- Cercospora asparagi Sacc. (1877)

Species of fungus

Cercospora asparagi is a fungal plant pathogen.
