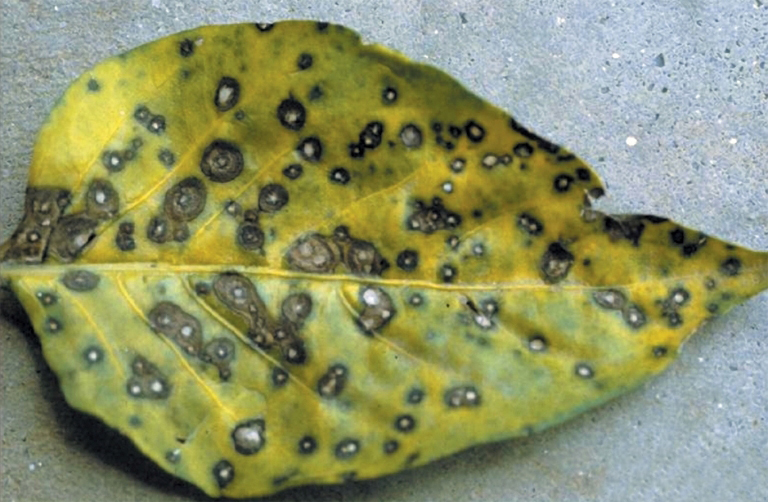
- Symptoms of Cercospora capsici

Scientific classification
- Domain: Eukaryota
- Kingdom: Fungi
- Division: Ascomycota
- Class: Dothideomycetes
- Order: Capnodiales
- Family: Mycosphaerellaceae
- Genus: Cercospora
- Species: C. capsici

Binomial name
- Cercospora capsici Heald & F.A.Wolf (1911)

Synonyms
- Cercospora unamunoi E.Castell. (1948); Phaeoramularia unamunoi (E.Castell.) Munt.-Cvetk. (1960)

= Cercospora capsici =

Species of fungus

Cercospora capsici is a species of fungus in the family Mycosphaerellaceae. It is a plant pathogen that causes leaf spot, known as frogeye spot, on peppers.
