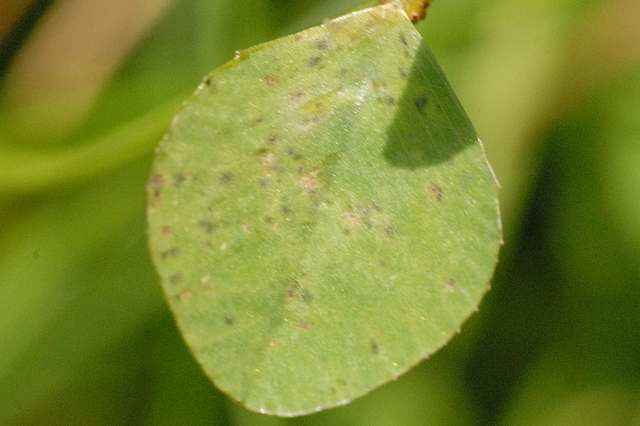

Scientific classification
- Kingdom: Fungi
- Division: Ascomycota
- Class: Dothideomycetes
- Order: Mycosphaerellales
- Family: Mycosphaerellaceae
- Genus: Cercospora
- Species: C. zebrina

Binomial name
- Cercospora zebrina Pass., (1877)

Synonyms
- Cercospora helvola Sacc., (1882); Cercospora stolziana Magnus, (1905)

= Cercospora zebrina =

Species of fungus

Cercospora zebrina is a fungal plant pathogen.
