= Cercospora platanicola =

Scientific classification
- Kingdom: Fungi
- Division: Ascomycota
- Class: Dothideomycetes
- Order: Mycosphaerellales
- Family: Mycosphaerellaceae
- Genus: Cercospora
- Species: C. platanicola

Binomial name
- Cercospora platanicola Ellis & Everh.

Species of fungus

Cercospora platanicola is a fungal plant pathogen. It causes leaf spot on the plane-tree.

During early spring, Cercospora spores are produced in the fruiting bodies of infected leaves. It appears as uneven, round tan spots with red and brown haloes that are approximately 0.1 to 1 cm large. Infections of Cercospora are of minor consequence to a tree's health, but may be treated with organic pesticides in the case of a severe outbreak.

== See also ==
- List of Cercospora species
