= Cercospora rosicola =

Scientific classification
- Kingdom: Fungi
- Division: Ascomycota
- Class: Dothideomycetes
- Order: Capnodiales
- Family: Mycosphaerellaceae
- Genus: Cercospora
- Species: C. rosicola

Binomial name
- Cercospora rosicola Pass., (1877)

Synonyms
- Passalora rosicola (Pass.) U. Braun, (1995)

Species of fungus

Cercospora rosicola is a fungal plant pathogen mostly found on plants in the United States, specifically within the state of Texas. The fungi mostly affects roses, and in severe infections can cause defoliation.

== Symptoms ==
Infected plants may show small purple-brown lesions sporadically around the surface of the leaves.
