= Cercospora rhapidicola =

Scientific classification
- Kingdom: Fungi
- Division: Ascomycota
- Class: Dothideomycetes
- Order: Capnodiales
- Family: Mycosphaerellaceae
- Genus: Cercospora
- Species: C. rhapidicola

Binomial name
- Cercospora rhapidicola Tominaga [as 'rhapisicola'], (1965)

Species of fungus

Cercospora rhapidicola is a fungal plant pathogen.
