= Cercospora fusimaculans =

Scientific classification
- Kingdom: Fungi
- Division: Ascomycota
- Class: Dothideomycetes
- Order: Capnodiales
- Family: Mycosphaerellaceae
- Genus: Cercospora
- Species: C. fusimaculans

Binomial name
- Cercospora fusimaculans G.F. Atk., (1892)

Synonyms
- Passalora fusimaculans (G.F. Atk.) U. Braun & Crous, (2003); Passalora fusimaculans var. fusimaculans (G.F. Atk.) U. Braun & Crous, (2003); Phaeoramularia fusimaculans (G.F. Atk.) X.J. Liu & Y.L. Guo, (1982)

Species of fungus

Cercospora fusimaculans is a fungal plant pathogen.
