= Cercospora arachidicola =

Scientific classification
- Kingdom: Fungi
- Division: Ascomycota
- Class: Dothideomycetes
- Order: Capnodiales
- Family: Mycosphaerellaceae
- Genus: Cercospora
- Species: C. arachidicola

Binomial name
- Cercospora arachidicola Hori, (1917)

Synonyms
- Passalora arachidicola

Species of fungus

Cercospora arachidicola is a fungal ascomycete plant pathogen that causes early leaf spot of peanut. Peanuts (Arachis hypogaea) originated in South America and are cultivated globally in warm, temperate and tropical regions.

All cultivars of peanuts are equally susceptible to peanut fungal pathogens; however, C. arachidicola is an economically important peanut pathogen and is responsible for significant economic losses in the peanut industry, more specifically in the Southeastern, Eastern, and the Southwestern United States. Early leaf spot of peanut can drastically reduce yields, leading to economic downturn of the peanut crop economy. Annual crop losses in the United States range anywhere from less than 1% to greater than 50% depending on disease management and treatment.

== Host and symptoms ==
Cercospora arachidicola only infects peanut plants, causing symptoms of brown lesions with chlorotic rings on the stems, leaves, and petioles. The first macroscopic symptoms usually appear on the adaxial surface of the lower leaves about 30 to 50 days after planting. Further damage can lead to premature defoliation and even yield loss. Signs include tufts of silvery, hair-like spores on lesions during humid weather.

== Disease cycle ==
Cercospora arachidicola (the anamorph stage) survives as stroma or mycelium in crop residue. Primary infection usually occurs after a period of rain, where the leaf is continually wet, and the pathogen thrives in areas of high relative humidity and moderate temperature (25-30 °C).

The anamorph stage is dominant due to the fact that ascospores produced in pseudothecia, which is embedded in plant tissue, during the teleomorph stage, (Mycosphaerella arachidis) are not often produced in nature. Conidia are the most important primary source of inoculum, and are produced on stromatic tissue of the adaxial leaf surface, infecting the leaves of the peanut plants. Conidia also act as the secondary inoculum, and continue to infect aboveground parts of the plant throughout the growing season. Wind, irrigation water, splashing rain, and insects have been found to aide in spore dispersal of the conidia.

== Management ==
Early leaf spot of peanut can be treated through the use of fungicides applied at the very early pod stage, and applied every two weeks thereafter. After analyzing the incidence and severity of the disease, strip-tillage techniques have also proven to be effective in delaying an epidemic by reducing the amount of initial infection. Furthermore, the delay in disease caused by the strip-tillage technique proposes that initial application of fungicides for use in disease management may be delayed without having negative effects on the treatment of early leaf spot of peanut.

Nevertheless, fungicides, such as the protectant fungicide, chlorothalonil, have been the standard for control leaf spots since the mid-1970s and is still widely used today. Tebuconazole, a systemic ergosterol biosynthesis-inhibiting fungicide, and pyraclostrobin, a strobilurin-type fungicide have also both proven effective in controlling early leaf spot, even more so than chlorothalonil.

Usually, fungicides need to be applied multiple times every few weeks; a typical treatment using chlorothalonil or tebuconazole requires fungicides application around seven times starting just 30–45 days after planting. The use of resistant cultivars is the most successful way to be overcome the pathogen and maintain yields. Sources of resistance have been reported and prolong incubation and latent period by reducing the number of lesions per unit area of leaf surface, defoliation, and sporulation.
