= Cercospora cannabis =

Scientific classification
- Kingdom: Fungi
- Division: Ascomycota
- Class: Dothideomycetes
- Order: Mycosphaerellales
- Family: Mycosphaerellaceae
- Genus: Cercospora
- Species: C. cannabis

Binomial name
- Cercospora cannabis Hara & Fukui, (1927)

Species of fungus

Cercospora cannabis is a fungal plant pathogen that causes leaf spot in hemp.
