= Cercospora theae =

Scientific classification
- Kingdom: Fungi
- Division: Ascomycota
- Class: Dothideomycetes
- Order: Capnodiales
- Family: Mycosphaerellaceae
- Genus: Cercospora
- Species: C. theae

Binomial name
- Cercospora theae Breda de Haan, (1900)

Species of fungus

Cercospora theae is a fungal plant pathogen. It is the pathogen that causes bird's eye spot disease in tea plants.
