= Melanodothis =

Scientific classification
- Kingdom: Fungi
- Division: Ascomycota
- Class: Dothideomycetes
- Order: Mycosphaerellales
- Family: Mycosphaerellaceae
- Genus: Melanodothis; R. Arnold

Genus of fungi

Melanodothis is a genus of fungi in the family Mycosphaerellaceae.
