= Cercospora atrofiliformis =

Scientific classification
- Kingdom: Fungi
- Division: Ascomycota
- Class: Dothideomycetes
- Order: Capnodiales
- Family: Mycosphaerellaceae
- Genus: Cercospora
- Species: C. atrofiliformis

Binomial name
- Cercospora atrofiliformis W.Y. Yen, T.C. Lo & C.C. Chi, (1953)

Species of fungus

Cercospora atrofiliformis is a fungal plant pathogen.
