= Cercospora corylina =

Scientific classification
- Kingdom: Fungi
- Division: Ascomycota
- Class: Dothideomycetes
- Order: Capnodiales
- Family: Mycosphaerellaceae
- Genus: Cercospora
- Species: C. corylina

Binomial name
- Cercospora corylina W.W. Ray, (1941)

Species of fungus

Cercospora corylina is a fungal plant pathogen.
