= Cercospora vexans =

Scientific classification
- Kingdom: Fungi
- Division: Ascomycota
- Class: Dothideomycetes
- Order: Mycosphaerellales
- Family: Mycosphaerellaceae
- Genus: Cercospora
- Species: C. vexans

Binomial name
- Cercospora vexans C. Massal., (1907)

Species of fungus

Cercospora vexans is a fungal plant pathogen.
