= Cercospora minuta =

Scientific classification
- Kingdom: Fungi
- Division: Ascomycota
- Class: Dothideomycetes
- Order: Capnodiales
- Family: Mycosphaerellaceae
- Genus: Cercospora
- Species: C. minuta

Binomial name
- Cercospora minuta Cooke & Ellis, (1876)

Species of fungus

Cercospora minuta is a fungal plant pathogen.
