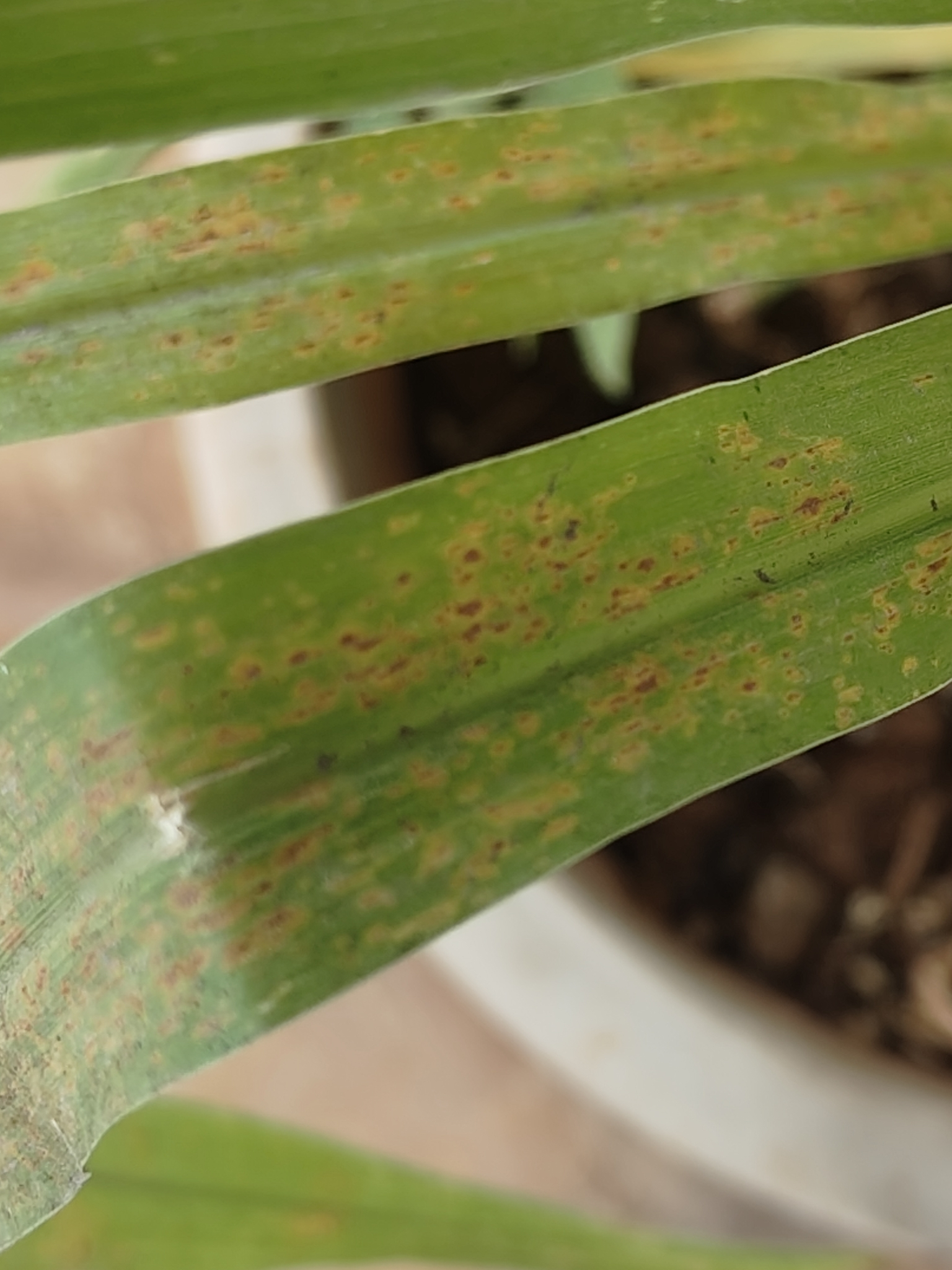

Scientific classification
- Kingdom: Fungi
- Division: Ascomycota
- Class: Dothideomycetes
- Order: Capnodiales
- Family: Mycosphaerellaceae
- Genus: Cercospora
- Species: C. penniseti

Binomial name
- Cercospora penniseti Chupp, 1954

= Cercospora penniseti =

Species of fungus

Cercospora penniseti is a fungal plant pathogen. It infects pearl millets.
