= Cercospora solani =

Scientific classification
- Kingdom: Fungi
- Division: Ascomycota
- Class: Dothideomycetes
- Order: Mycosphaerellales
- Family: Mycosphaerellaceae
- Genus: Cercospora
- Species: C. solani

Binomial name
- Cercospora solani Feuilleaub. (1880)

Species of fungus

Cercospora solani is a foliicolous fungal pathogen afflicting the nightshade family.
