= Cercospora brassicicola =

Scientific classification
- Kingdom: Fungi
- Division: Ascomycota
- Class: Dothideomycetes
- Order: Mycosphaerellales
- Family: Mycosphaerellaceae
- Genus: Cercospora
- Species: C. brassicicola

Binomial name
- Cercospora brassicicola Henn., (1905)

Synonyms
- Cercospora bloxamii Berk. & Broome, (1882)

Species of fungus

Cercospora brassicicola is a fungal plant pathogen that causes white leaf spot in almost all species of Brassica.
