= Cercospora odontoglossi =

Scientific classification
- Kingdom: Fungi
- Division: Ascomycota
- Class: Dothideomycetes
- Order: Mycosphaerellales
- Family: Mycosphaerellaceae
- Genus: Cercospora
- Species: C. odontoglossi

Binomial name
- Cercospora odontoglossi Prill. & Delacr., (1893)

Species of fungus

Cercospora odontoglossi is a fungal plant pathogen.
