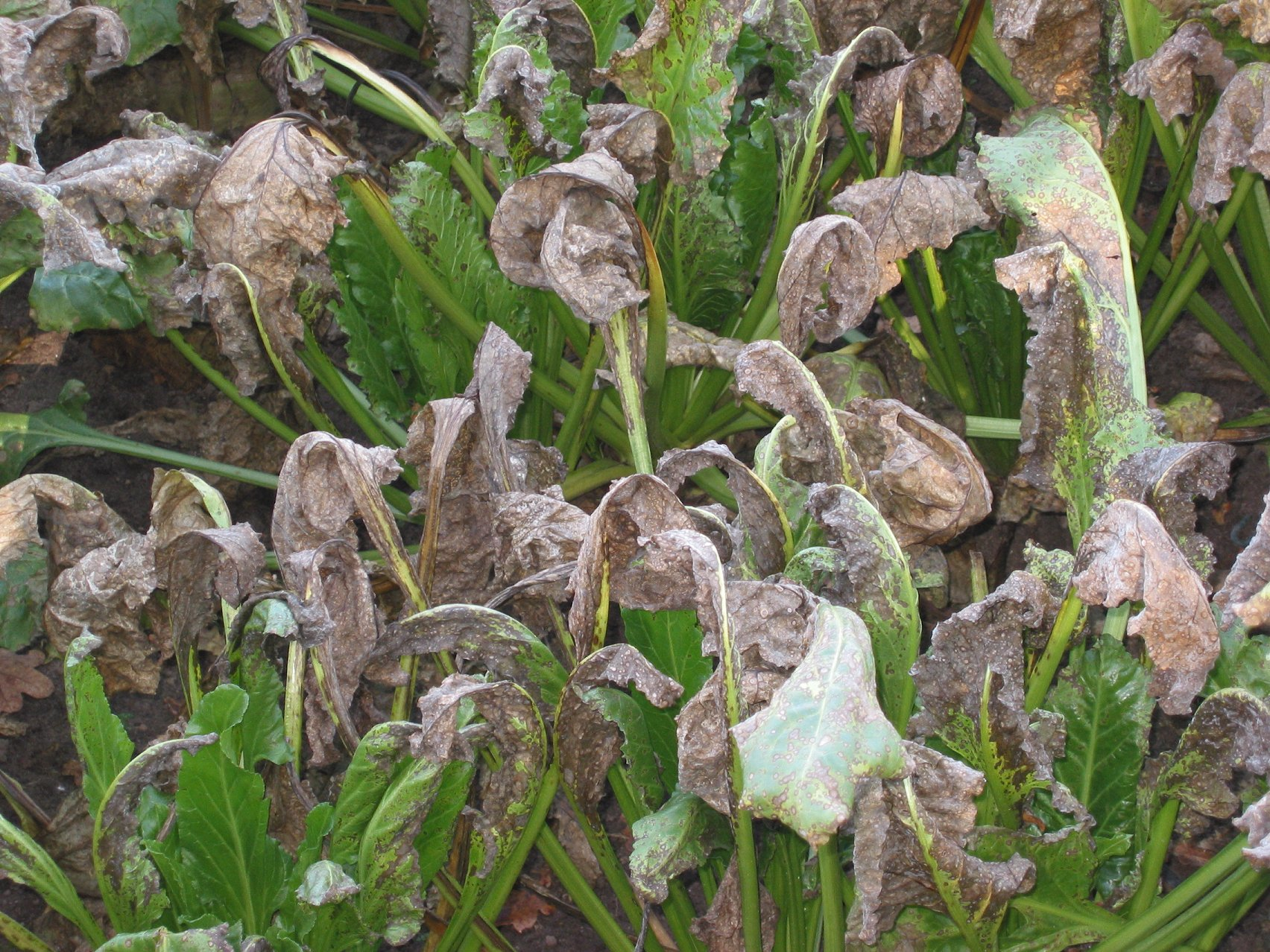
- Cercospora beticola on sugarbeets

Scientific classification
- Kingdom: Fungi
- Division: Ascomycota
- Class: Dothideomycetes
- Order: Capnodiales
- Family: Mycosphaerellaceae
- Genus: Cercospora
- Species: C. beticola

Binomial name
- Cercospora beticola Sacc., (1876)

= Cercospora beticola =

Species of fungus

Cercospora beticola is a fungal plant pathogen which typically infects plants of the genus Beta, within the family of Chenopodiaceae. It is the cause of Cercospora leaf spot disease in sugar beets, spinach and swiss chard. Of these hosts, Cercospora leaf spot is the most economically impactful in sugar beets (Beta vulgaris). Cercospora beticola is a deuteromycete fungus that reproduces using conidia. There is no teleomorph stage. C. beticola is a hemibiotrophic fungus that uses phytotoxins specifically Cercospora beticola toxin (CBT) to kill infected plants. CBT causes the leaf spot symptom and prevents root formation. Yield losses from Cercospora leaf spot are around 20 percent.

== Hosts and symptoms ==
Hosts of Cercospora beticola include sugar beets (Beta vulgaris), swiss chard (Beta vulgaris L. subsp. cicla) and other leafy greens. Symptoms include the random distribution of spots with brownish red rings which eventually cause leaf collapse. Older leaves will have spots of larger diameters as rings grow outward. Conidia are not observable by the unaided eye

== Disease cycle ==
Stromata (a sclerotia-like survival structure containing conidia when made) in field debris starts the life cycle. Under favorable wet conditions, conidia are rain-splashed and insect-carried to new hosts, where, under humid and wet conditions, they germinate and penetrate through stomata. These conidia germinate in polycyclic microcycles until the end of the growing season. At the end of the growing season, C. beticola produces stromata again as a survival structure. Microcycles like the one used by C. beticola are very effective at producing many conidia. Because these conidia are effective at penetrating the host, mycelium is not necessary, and conidia produce their own conidia at each new infection (microcycle). There have been no direct observations of sexual spores in C. beticola.

Biological cycle of cercospora on sugar beet.

== Management ==
Copper was historically used to control C. beticola in the field, though today fungicides are more common. C. beticola has been shown to have some resistance to benzimidazole and thiophanate class fungicides. As a result, experts often have recommended fungicide rotation to kill any potential fungicide resistant strains. Some varieties of sugar beet also show resistance to C. beticola, unfortunately they have all had low yields in lab tests. Today the most common fungicides used are QoI, Headline, Proline, Inspire SB, Eminent and Super Tin or Agri Tin

== Gallery ==
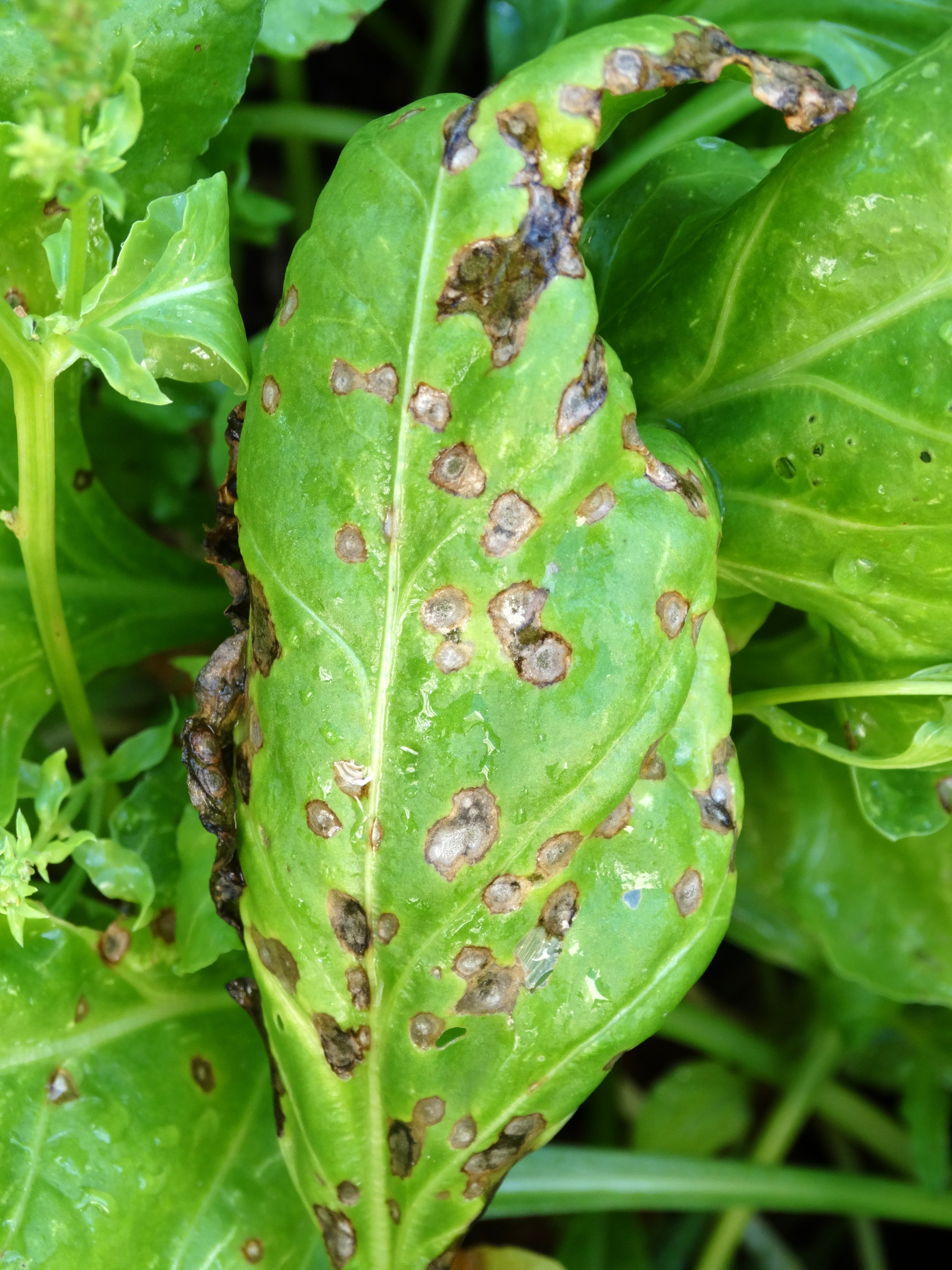
Spots on a spinach leaf caused by Cercospora beticola

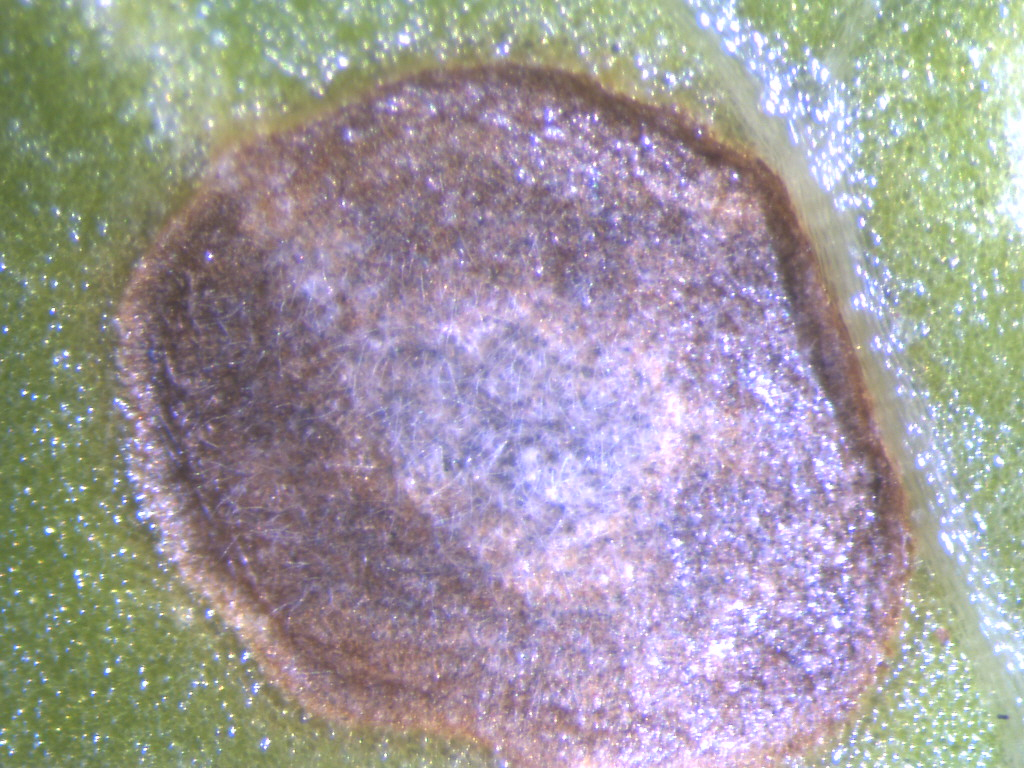
Close-up of a spot on a spinach leaf caused by Cercospora beticola
