= Cercospora longipes =

Scientific classification
- Kingdom: Fungi
- Division: Ascomycota
- Class: Dothideomycetes
- Order: Capnodiales
- Family: Mycosphaerellaceae
- Genus: Cercospora
- Species: C. longipes

Binomial name
- Cercospora longipes E.J. Butler, (1906)

Species of fungus

Cercospora longipes is a fungal plant pathogen.
