= Cercospora puderii =

Scientific classification
- Kingdom: Fungi
- Division: Ascomycota
- Class: Dothideomycetes
- Order: Mycosphaerellales
- Family: Mycosphaerellaceae
- Genus: Cercospora
- Species: C. puderii

Binomial name
- Cercospora puderii B.H. Davis, (1937)

Species of fungus

Cercospora puderii is a fungal plant pathogen. It produces brown or greyish brown spots with minute white centres and reddish brown margins.
