= Cercospora brunkii =

Scientific classification
- Kingdom: Fungi
- Division: Ascomycota
- Class: Dothideomycetes
- Order: Capnodiales
- Family: Mycosphaerellaceae
- Genus: Cercospora
- Species: C. brunkii

Binomial name
- Cercospora brunkii Ellis & L.D. Galloway (1890)

Species of fungus

Cercospora brunkii is a fungus that is a pathogen of Pelargonium plants.
