= Cercospora longissima =

Scientific classification
- Kingdom: Fungi
- Division: Ascomycota
- Class: Dothideomycetes
- Order: Mycosphaerellales
- Family: Mycosphaerellaceae
- Genus: Cercospora
- Species: C. longissima

Binomial name
- Cercospora longissima Cooke & Ellis, (1889)

Species of fungus

Cercospora longissima is a fungal plant pathogen.
