= Cercospora lentis =

Scientific classification
- Kingdom: Fungi
- Division: Ascomycota
- Class: Dothideomycetes
- Order: Mycosphaerellales
- Family: Mycosphaerellaceae
- Genus: Cercospora
- Species: C. lentis

Binomial name
- Cercospora lentis N.D. Sharma, R.P. Mishra & A.C. Jain [as 'lensii'], (1978)

Species of fungus

Cercospora lentis is a fungal plant pathogen.

== Biology and disease on lentils ==
Cercospora lentis is a fungal plant pathogen that causes leaf spot disease in lentil crops (Lens culinaris). It belongs to a large group of fungi in the genus Cercospora, which are known to infect many agricultural plants worldwide.

The disease typically appears as small brown to dark lesions on leaves, which may expand under warm and humid conditions. Severe infections can reduce photosynthesis and lead to decreased crop yield.

The fungus spreads through spores that are dispersed by wind and rain splash and can survive in infected plant debris, allowing the disease to persist between growing seasons.
