= Cercospora brachypus =

Scientific classification
- Kingdom: Fungi
- Division: Ascomycota
- Class: Dothideomycetes
- Order: Mycosphaerellales
- Family: Mycosphaerellaceae
- Genus: Cercospora
- Species: C. brachypus

Binomial name
- Cercospora brachypus Ellis & Everh., (1902)

Synonyms
- Pseudocercospora brachypus

Species of fungus

Cercospora brachypus is a fungal plant pathogen. In viticulture, it is called Angular Leaf Spot. Its host plants includeVitis rotundifolia and Ampelopsis cantoniensis.

It occurs in the Southern United States and China. It causes premature defoliation and subsequent crop failure.
