= Cercospora angreci =

Scientific classification
- Kingdom: Fungi
- Division: Ascomycota
- Class: Dothideomycetes
- Order: Mycosphaerellales
- Family: Mycosphaerellaceae
- Genus: Cercospora
- Species: C. angreci

Binomial name
- Cercospora angreci Feuilleaub. & Roum., (1883)

Species of fungus

Cercospora angreci is a fungal plant pathogen. It causes leaf spot/blight in orchids.
