= Distocercospora =

Scientific classification
- Kingdom: Fungi
- Division: Ascomycota
- Class: Dothideomycetes
- Order: Capnodiales
- Family: Mycosphaerellaceae
- Genus: Distocercospora; N.Pons & B.Sutton (1988)

Type species
- Distocercospora pachyderma (Syd. & P.Syd.) N.Pons & B.Sutton (1988)

Genus of fungi

Distocercospora is a genus of plant-pathogenic fungi in the family Mycosphaerellaceae. The genus was circumscribed in 1988 with Distocercospora pachyderma as the type species in 1988.

They are distributed on the islands of Japan, Micronesia and Polynesia.

== Species ==
As accepted by Species Fungorum;

- Distocercospora africana Crous & U. Braun (1994)
- Distocercospora indica N.K. Verma & A.N. Rai (2014)
- Distocercospora pachyderma (Syd. & P. Syd.) N. Pons & B. Sutton (1988)

Former species,

- D. livistonae U. Braun & C.F. Hill (2006) = Exosporium livistonicola, Ascomycota
