= Cercospora halstedii =

Scientific classification
- Domain: Eukaryota
- Kingdom: Fungi
- Division: Ascomycota
- Class: Dothideomycetes
- Order: Capnodiales
- Family: Mycosphaerellaceae
- Genus: Cercospora
- Species: C. halstedii

Binomial name
- Cercospora halstedii Ellis & Everh., (1891)

Species of fungus

Cercospora halstedii is a fungal plant pathogen.
