= Cercospora fuchsiae =

Scientific classification
- Kingdom: Fungi
- Division: Ascomycota
- Class: Dothideomycetes
- Order: Capnodiales
- Family: Mycosphaerellaceae
- Genus: Cercospora
- Species: C. fuchsiae

Binomial name
- Cercospora fuchsiae Chupp & A.S. Mull., (1942)

Species of fungus

Cercospora fuchsiae is a fungal plant pathogen.

== Description ==
- Leaf spots circular to angular, 2–8 mm. in diameter, pale to medium dark brown, the older spots with a pale center or with concentric rings and a dark line margin
- fruiting chiefly epiphyllous
- stromata a few cells to 30 μm in diameter, dark brown; fascicles 3-20 diverging stalks; conidiophores pale to medium dark brown, paler and sometimes more narrow toward the tip, plainly multiseptate, slightly branched, 0-2 geniculate or undulate, straight to curved, medium spore scar at the subtruncate tip, 4–5.5 x 30-130 μm
- conidia hyaline, acicular to obclavate, straight to mildly curved, indistinctly multiseptate, base truncate to long obconically truncate, tip subacute to subobtuse, 2–3.5 x 20-75 μm.
