= Cercospora kikuchii =

Scientific classification
- Domain: Eukaryota
- Kingdom: Fungi
- Division: Ascomycota
- Class: Dothideomycetes
- Order: Capnodiales
- Family: Mycosphaerellaceae
- Genus: Cercospora
- Species: C. kikuchii

Binomial name
- Cercospora kikuchii T. Matsumoto & Tomoy., (1925)

Species of fungus

Cercospora kikuchii is a fungal plant pathogen that affects soybeans. It results in both the Cercospora leaf blight and purple seed stain diseases on soybean and is found almost worldwide. C. kikuchii produces the toxin cercosporin, as do a number of other Cercospora species.

== Symptoms ==
Seed: The disease on the host soybean itself can be determined by a light activated red perlene quinon, cercosporin, with a molecular weight of 534. In being exposed to light, cercosporin causes oxidative damage to the hosts cells membranes, lipids, and proteins, resulting in cell death (Newman 2016). Purple seed stain by Cercospora can be determined by a variety of factors. First, infected seeds have spots that are usually pink or purple. The size can be from minuscule to covering the whole seed (Li 2019). The coloration will be from the hilum area. Germination and seedling size may be delayed after 50% of the seed is covered. They may also have lower oil and higher protein.

Cotyledons: Cotyledons will shrivel and fall off.

Stems: Stems will have red deep lesions about ¼ inch in size.

Leaves: Young leaves on top and bottom will have reddish purple lesions from minuscule to ½ inch in size. The leaf itself will become purple, described as a dark bronzing. Severely infected upper leaves will fall off (Giesler). If this defoliation occurs during the period of seed fill, significant yield losses have been recorded (Schneider et al. 2009).

== Environment ==
C. kuckuchii has a large range of habitable environments, but it is most prolific, and the greatest threat in top soybean producing countries such as Brazil, China, the United States, and India (Soares et al. 2015). The disease thrives in conditions of high temperature and humidity. “Sporulation increases as temperature rises above 80 degrees Fahrenheit” (26.7 degrees Celsius)(Jeschke 2020). More wind and water (rain, river, ground water) will result in further and more spore distribution on plant tissue. It usually occurs later in the season around August. The disease survives on crop residue from four months to four years (Ward, 2015). This means it thrives on no till tilled repeat planted fields (Schapaugh 2014).

== Management ==
Extended crop rotation and residue incorporation reduces inoculum. Seed treatment foliar fungicides applied during R3- R5 can reduce blight incidence and severity. The farmers can blend infected beans with clean and still sell them (Successful Farming Staff 2018). Dr. Anne Dorrance in 2019 also suggested planting varieties with resistance to Cercospora, plant disease free seeds, proper plant spacing to prevent spore spreading, and harvest during dry times.

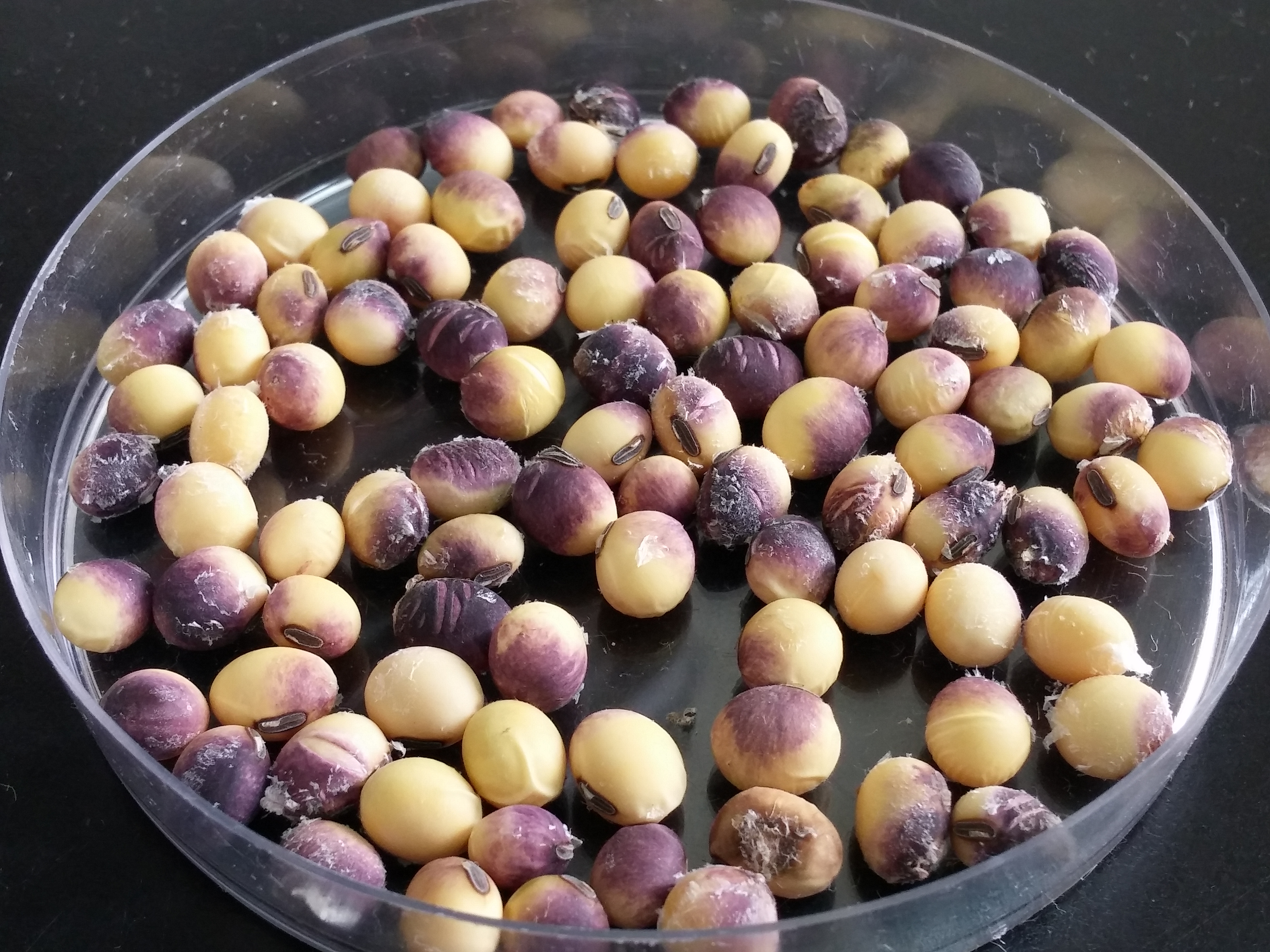

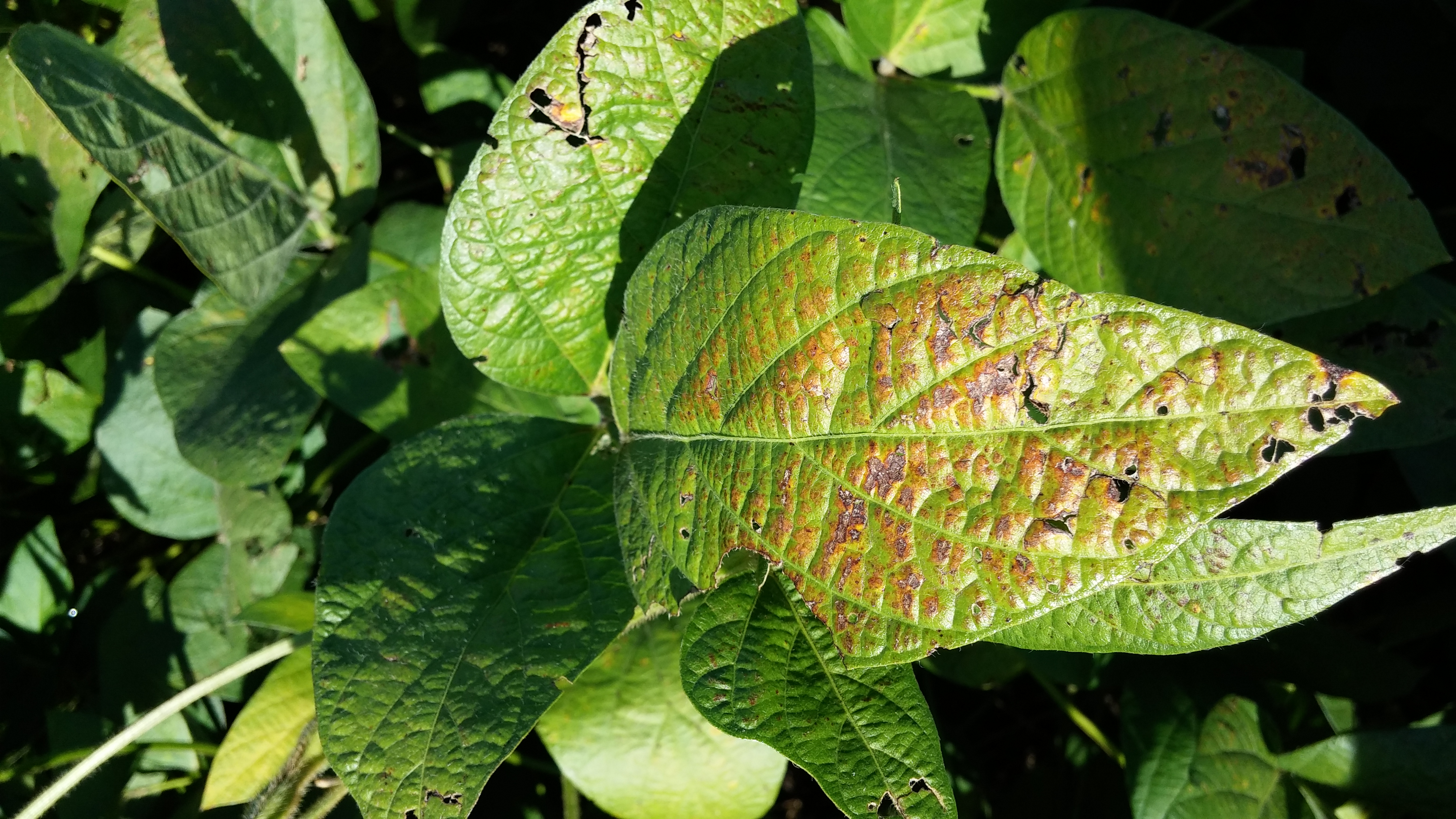

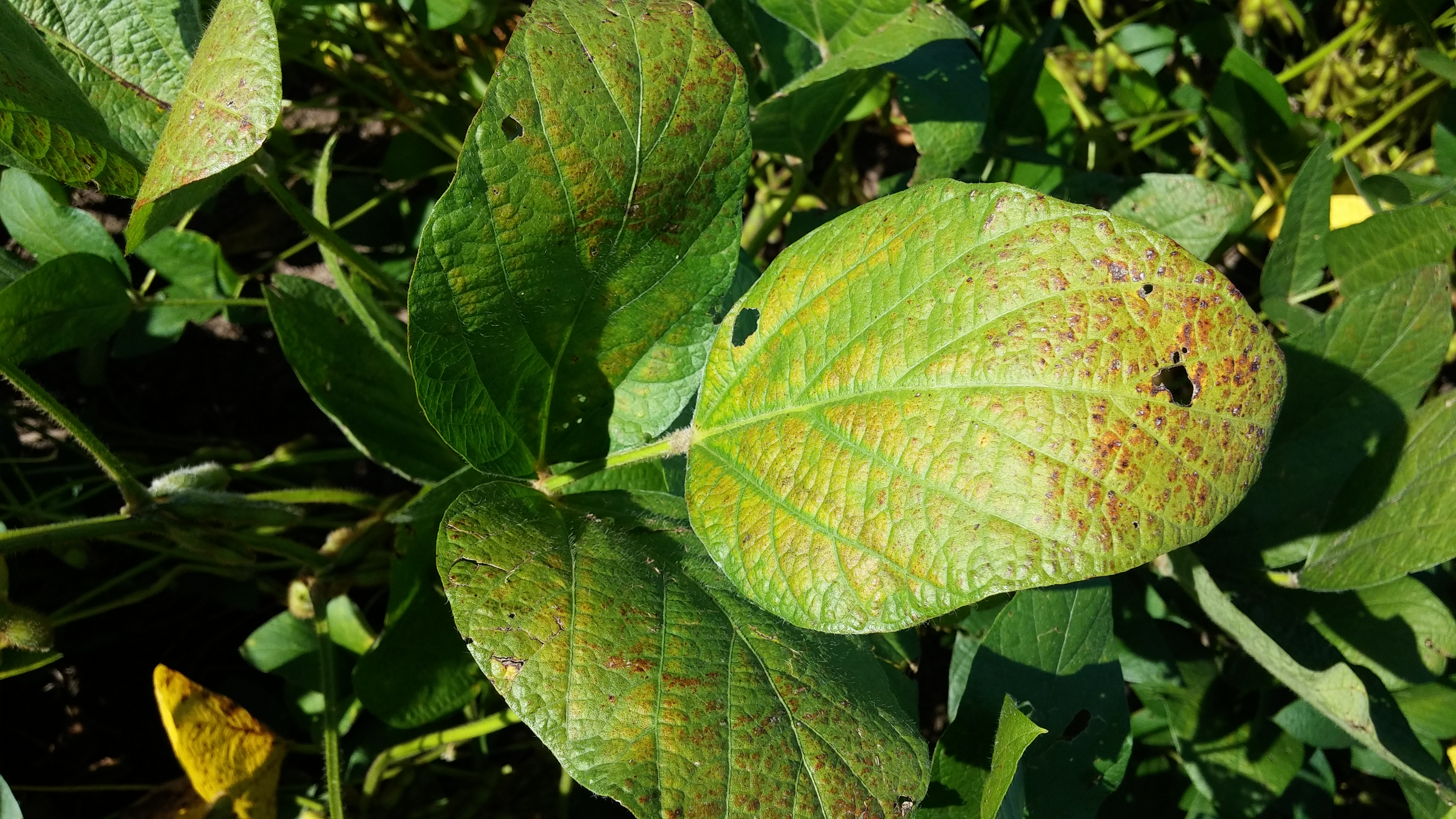

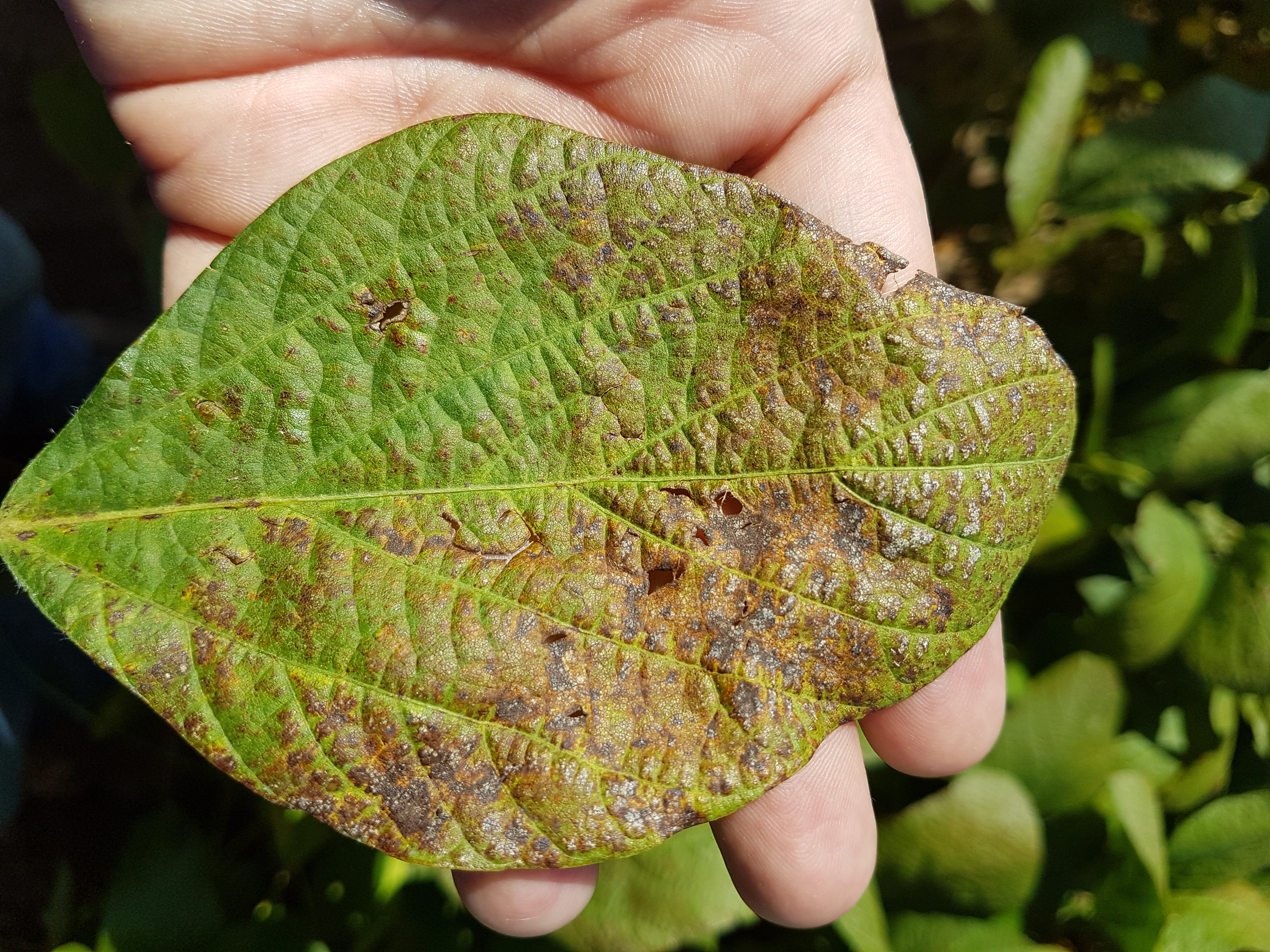
Cercospora leaf blight (CLB) 1

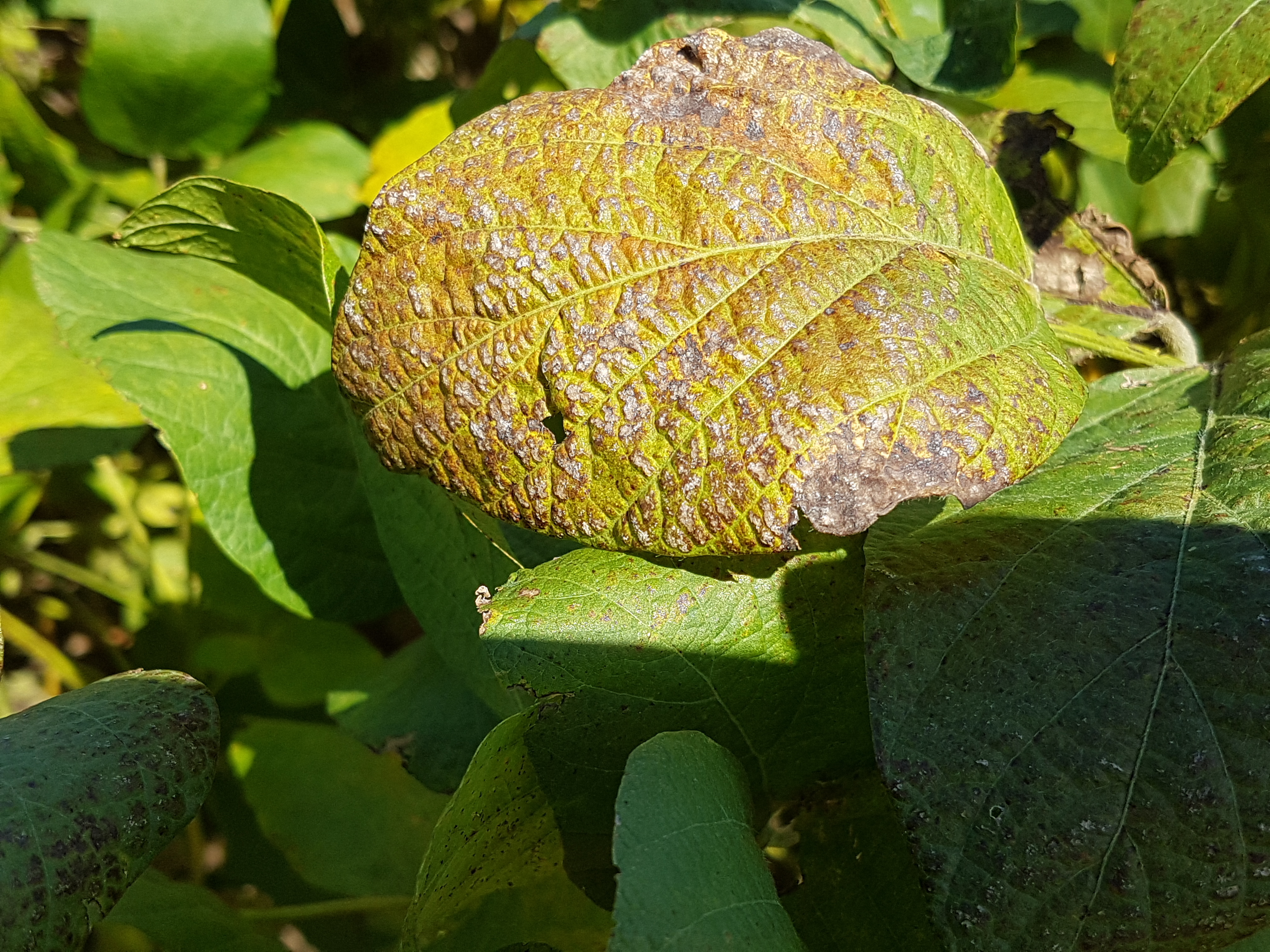
Cercospora leaf blight (CLB) 2

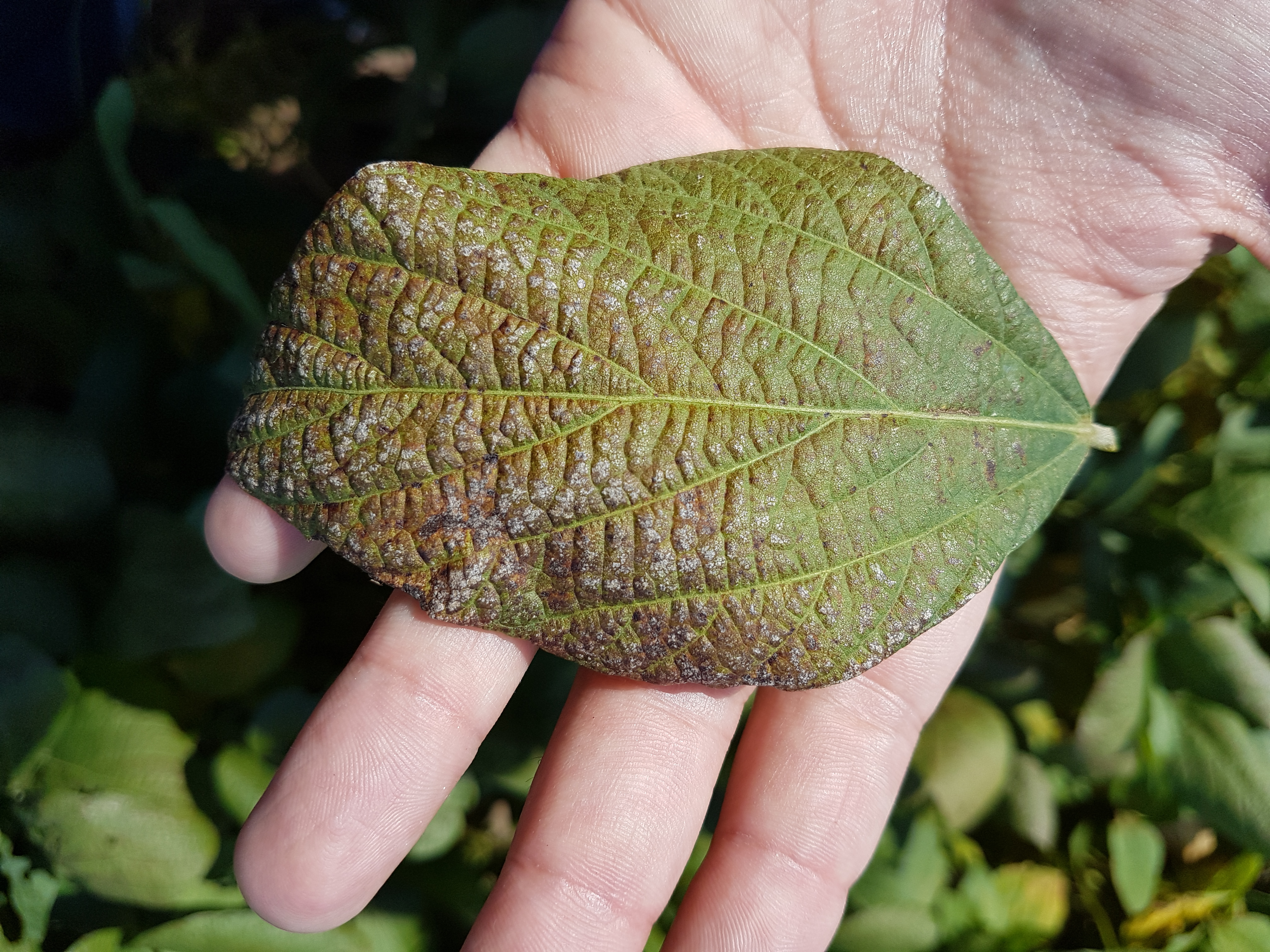
Cercospora leaf blight (CLB) 3

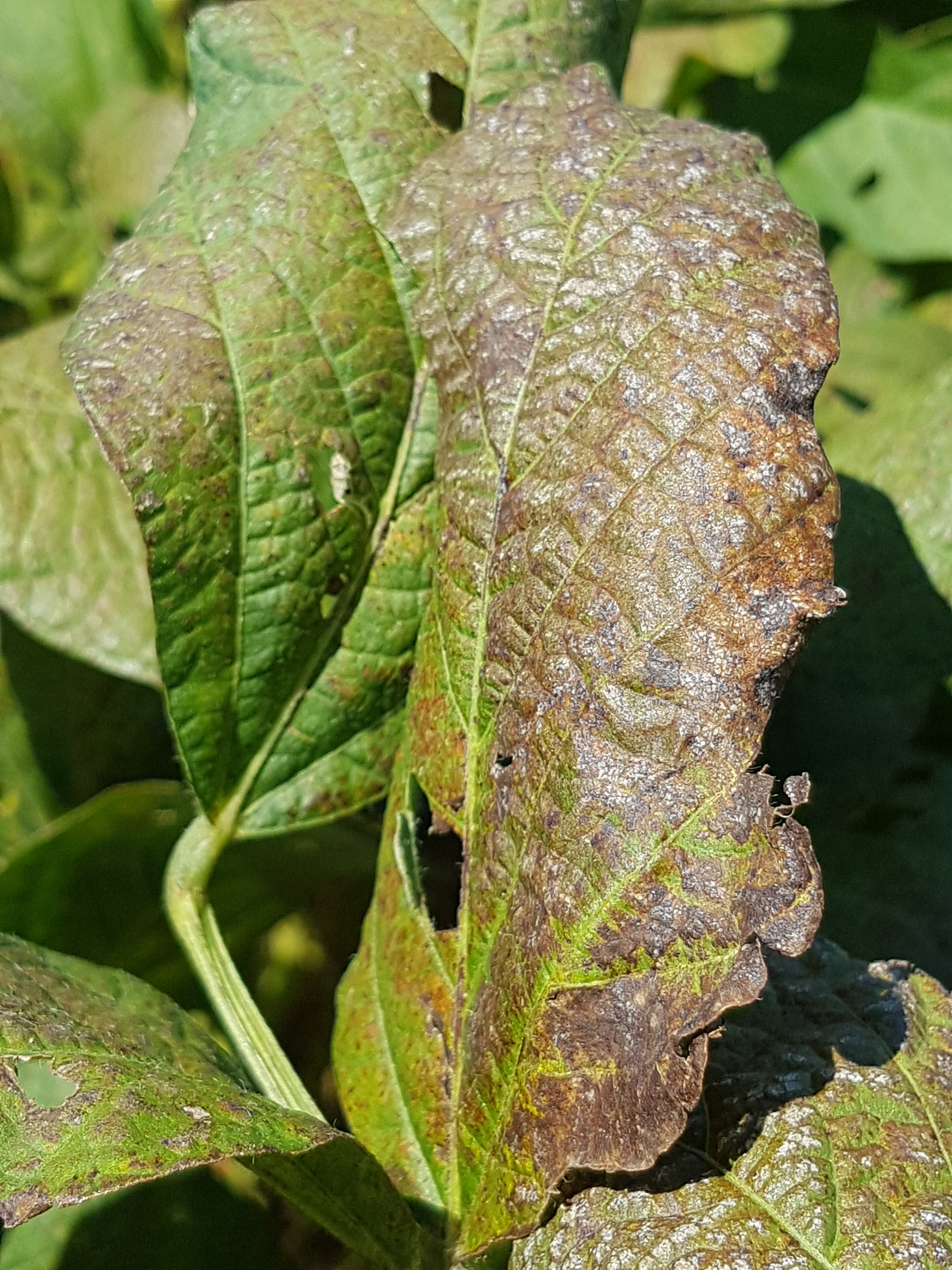
Cercospora leaf blight (CLB) 4

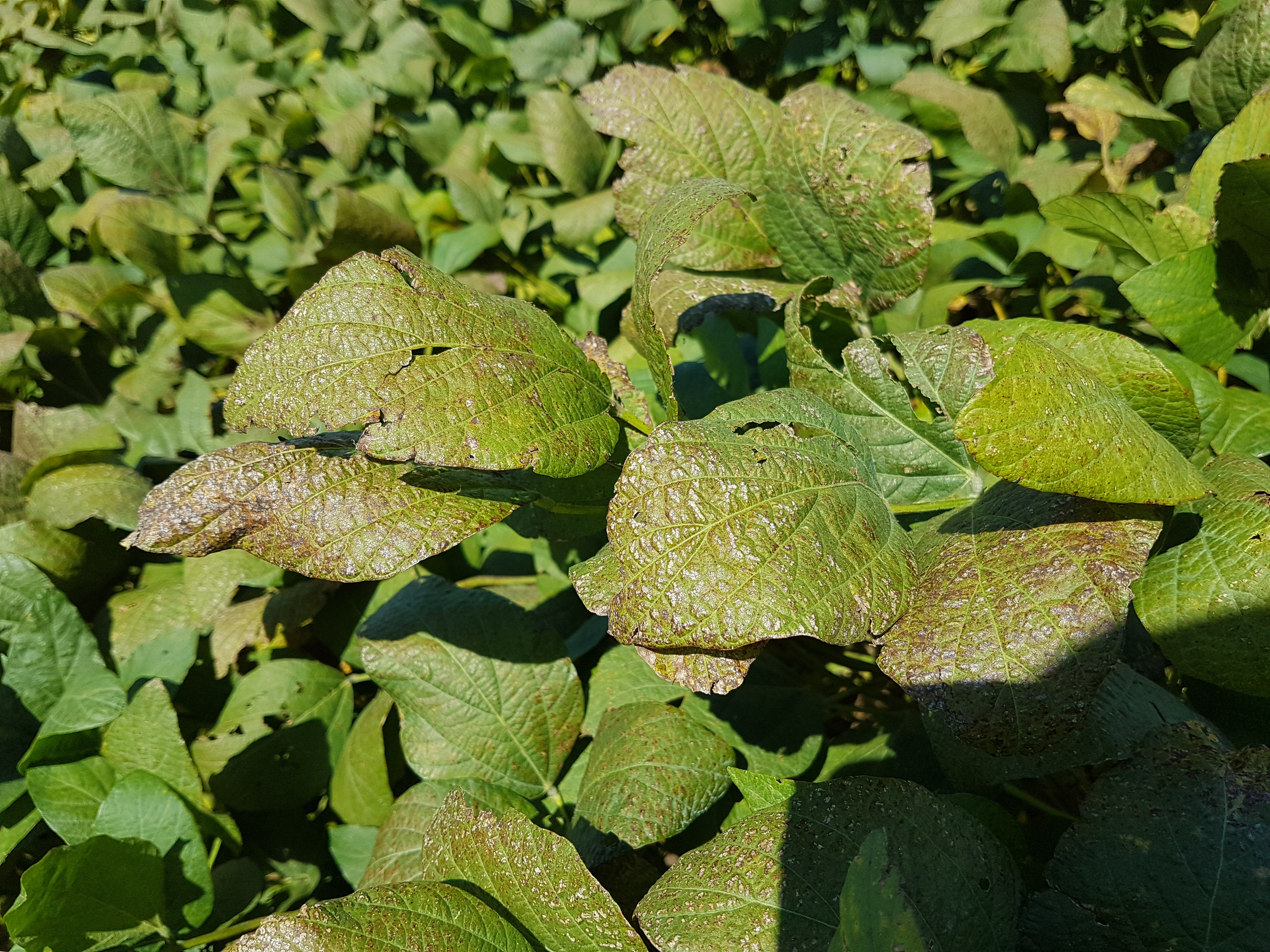
Cercospora leaf blight (CLB) 5

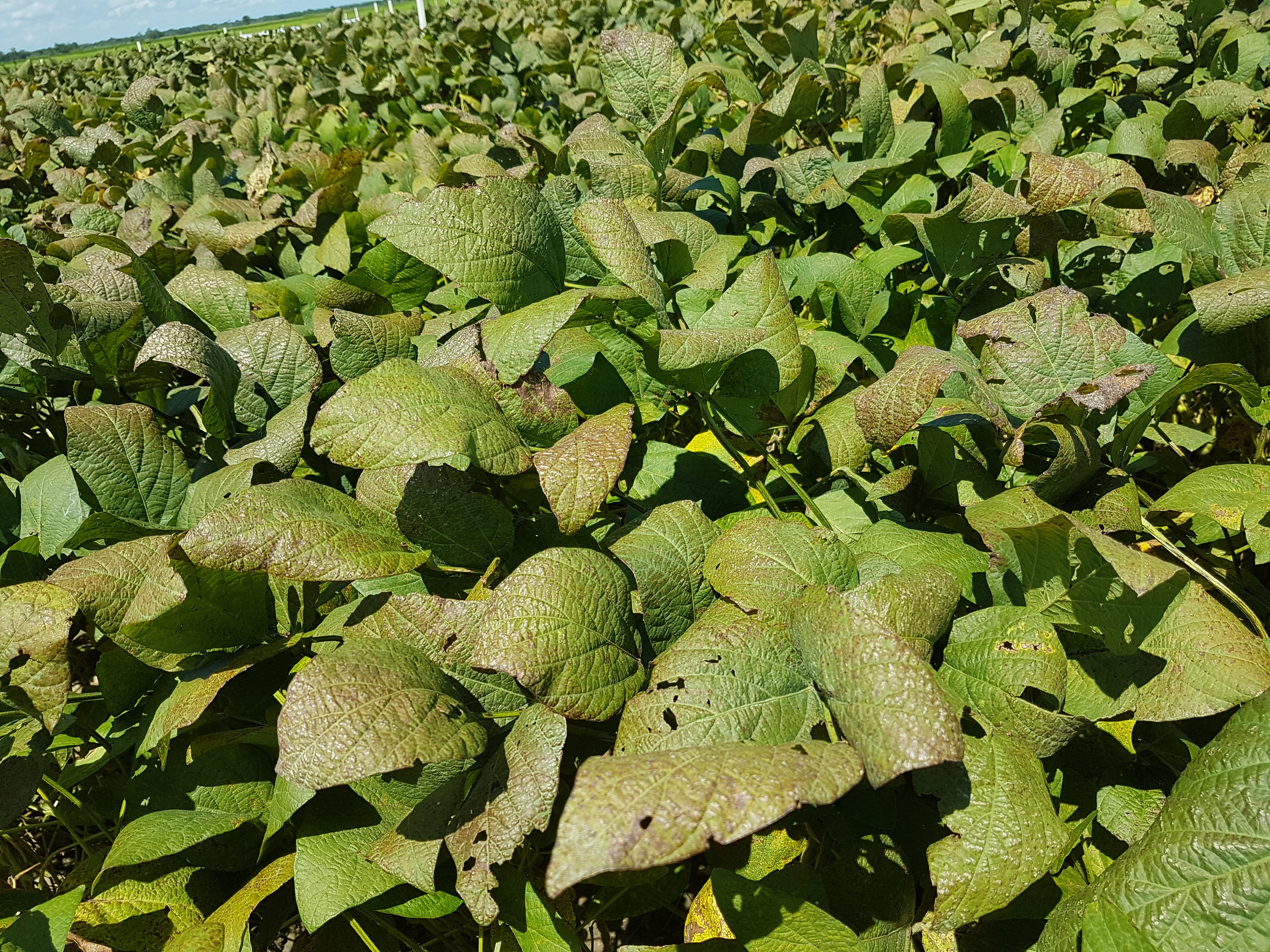
Cercospora leaf blight (CLB) 6

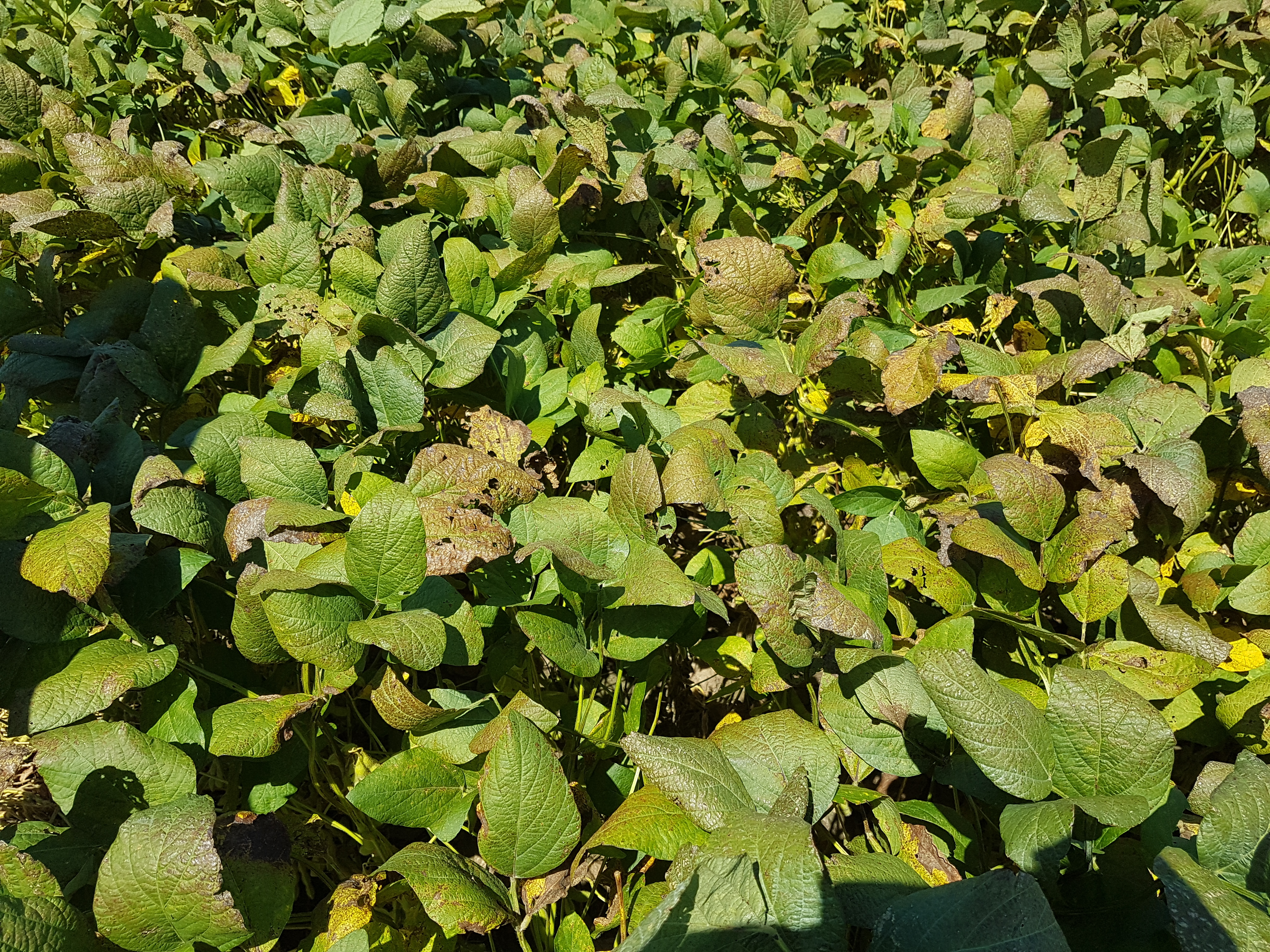
Cercospora leaf blight (CLB) 7

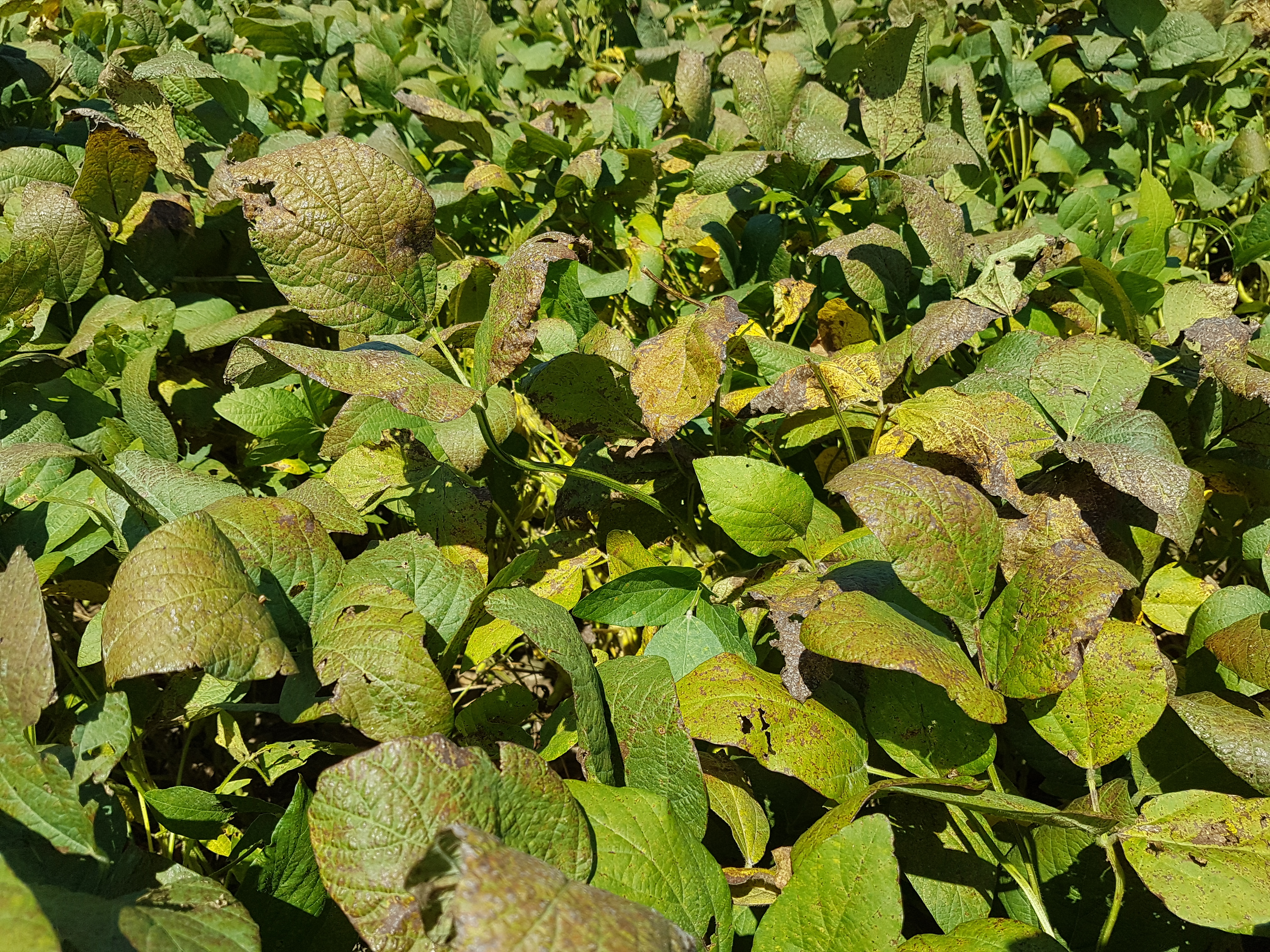
Cercospora leaf blight (CLB) 8

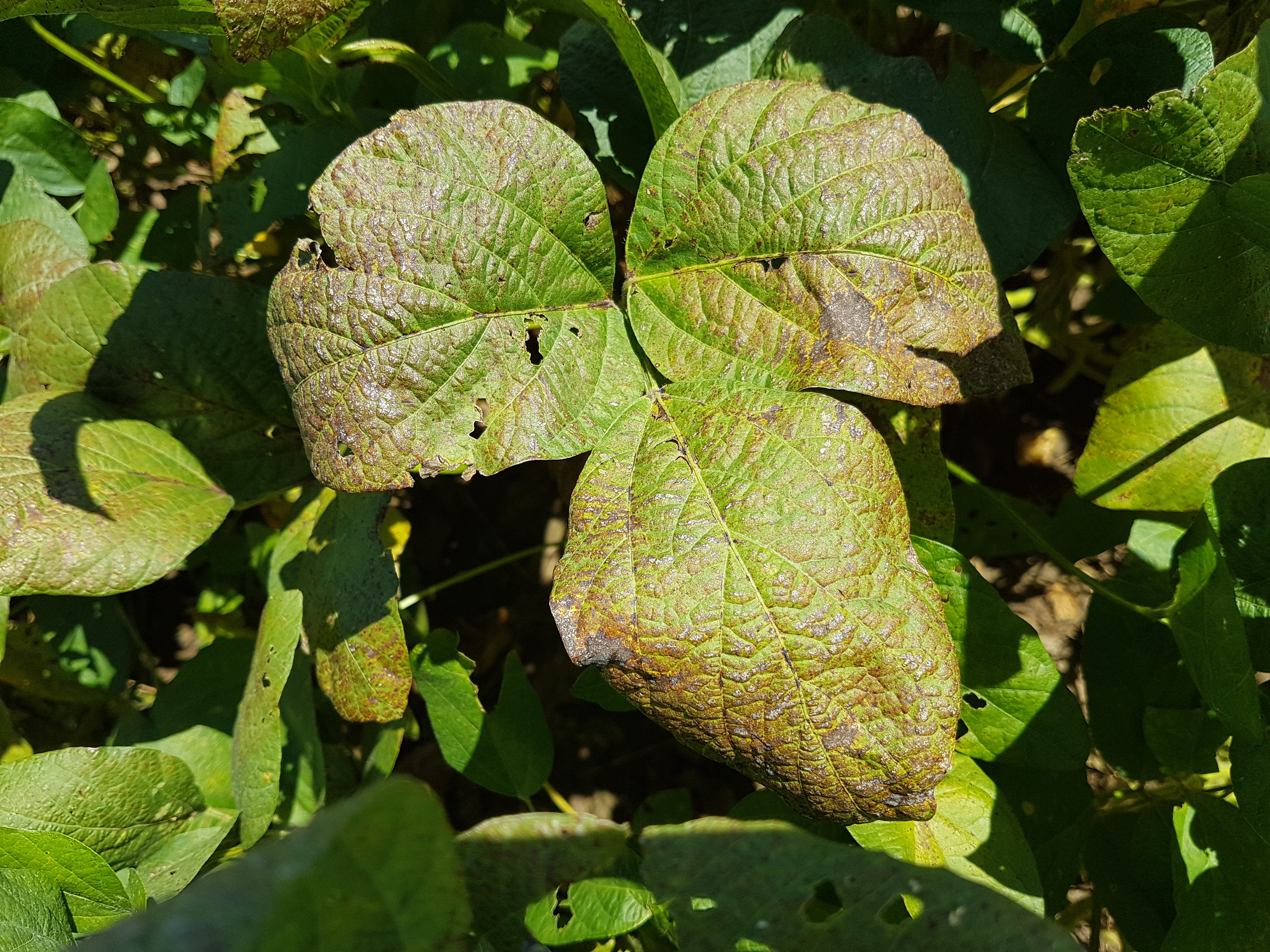
Cercospora leaf blight (CLB) 9
