= Lecanosticta =

Scientific classification
- Kingdom: Fungi
- Division: Ascomycota
- Class: Dothideomycetes
- Order: Mycosphaerellales
- Family: Mycosphaerellaceae
- Genus: Lecanosticta; Syd.

Type species
- Lecanosticta pini Syd.

Genus of plant pathogenic fungi

Lecanosticta is a genus of fungi in the family Mycosphaerellaceae consisting of ten species.

== Species ==
There are ten species in this genus:

- Lecanosticta acicola (Thum.) Syd. (1924)
- Lecanosticta brevispora Quaedvl. & Crous (2012)
- Lecanosticta gaubae (Petr.) Arx & Constant. (1983)
- Lecanosticta gloeospora H.C Evans (1984)
- Lecanosticta guatemalensis Quaedvl. & Crous (2012)
- Lecanosticta jani van der Nest, M.J Wingf. & I. Barnes (2019)
- Lecanosticta longispora Marm. (2000)
- Lecanosticta pharomachri van der Nest, M.J Wingf. & I. Barnes (2019)
- Lecanosticta tecunumanii van der Nest, M.J Wingf. & I. Barnes (2019)
- Lecanosticta variabilis van der Nest, M.J Wingf. & I. Barnes (2019)

== Pathogenic species ==
Lecanosticta acicola is a widespread plant pathogen of over 50 species of pine (Pinus spp.) globally, causing a disease known as brown spot needle blight. The disease infects pine needles and causes them to prematurely drop, resulting in reduced growth and yield losses.

In 2022, Lecanosticta pharomachri was implicated as the cause of needle disease outbreaks in Colombian planted forests.
