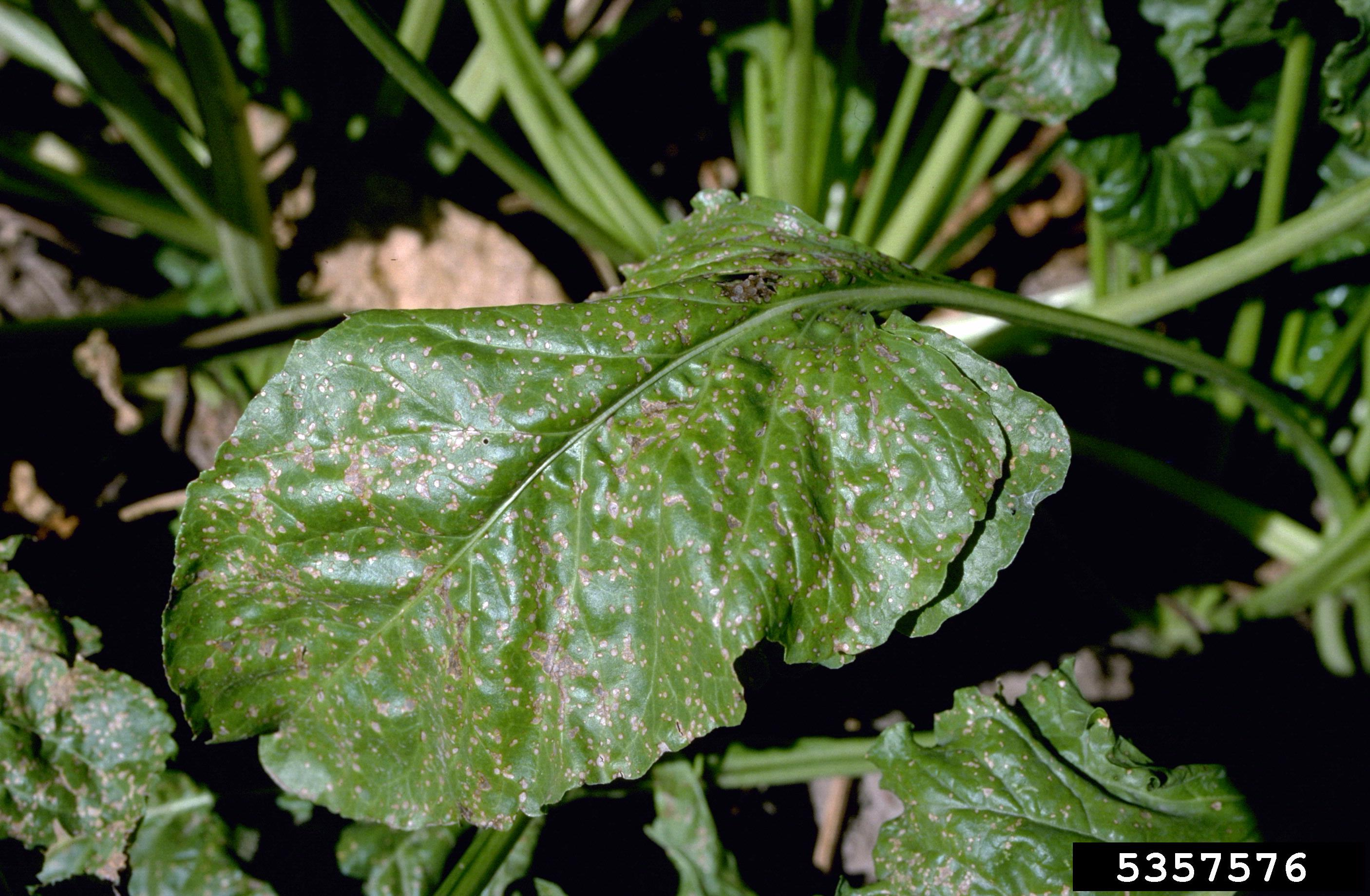
- Cercospora beticola on sugar beet

Scientific classification
- Kingdom: Fungi
- Division: Ascomycota
- Class: Dothideomycetes
- Order: Mycosphaerellales
- Family: Mycosphaerellaceae
- Genus: Cercospora; Fresen. ex Fuckel (1863)

Type species
- Cercospora apii Fresen. (1863)

Species
- 3,000+, see text

Synonyms
- Cercosporina Speg. (1910); Virgasporium Cooke (1875)

= Cercospora =

Genus of fungi

Cercospora is a genus of ascomycete fungi. Most species have no known sexual stage, and when the sexual stage is identified, it is in the genus Mycosphaerella. Most species of this genus cause plant diseases, and form leaf spots. It is a relatively well-studied genus of fungi, but there are countless species not yet described, and there is still much to learn about the best-known members of the genus.

It has a cosmopolitan distribution worldwide.

== Selected species ==
The GBIF accepts 837 species (as of July 2023); See also list of Cercospora species

- Cercospora acetosella - found on sheep sorrel and other docks
- Cercospora aciculina
- Cercospora agerati
- Cercospora alabemensis
- Cercospora alismatis
- Cercospora althaeina
- Cercospora angreci - causes leaf spot of orchids
- Cercospora angulata
- Cercospora apii - causes leaf spot on celery, and found on other plants, including Impatiens
- Cercospora apii f.sp. clerodendri
- Cercospora apiicola - causes leaf spot on celery
- Cercospora arachidicola - causes peanut leaf spot
- Cercospora arctii
- Cercospora arctii-ambrosiae
- Cercospora asparagi - found on asparagus
- Cercospora atro-marginalis
- Cercospora atrofiliformis - causes "black stripe" on sugarcane
- Cercospora beticola - causes leaf spot on Beta vulgaris and spinach
- Cercospora bolleana - found on figs
- Cercospora bougainvilleae
- Cercospora brachiata
- Cercospora byliana
- Cercospora brachypus - found on grapes
- Cercospora brassicicola - infests many cole crops
- Cercospora brunkii - found on Pelargonium and Geranium.
- Cercospora bunchosiae
- Cercospora canescens
- Cercospora cannabis - causes olive leaf spot on Cannabis spp., and is found on hops
- Cercospora cantuariensis - found on hops
- Cercospora capsici - causes "frogeye" leaf spot on peppers
- Cercospora caribaea
- Cercospora carotae - causes carrot leaf blight
- Cercospora circumscissa - causes brown shot hole on Prunus subg. Cerasus
- Cercospora citrullina - causes "cucurbit leaf spot" on watermelon and cucumber plants
- Cercospora clemensiae
- Cercospora coffeicola - infests coffee plants
- Cercospora coryli - found on hazels
- Cercospora corylina - found on hazels
- Cercospora eleusine - causes leaf spot of Finger millet
- Cercospora cf. flagellaris syn. C. piaropi
- Cercospora fragariae - causes strawberry leaf spot
- Cercospora fuchsiae
- Cercospora fusca
- Cercospora fusimaculans - found on many grasses
- Cercospora gerberae
- Cercospora halstedii
- Cercospora handelii
- Cercospora hayi
- Cercospora hydrangeae
- Cercospora kaki
- Cercospora kikuchii - causes leaf blight and purple seed stain on soybean
- Cercospora lentis - found on lentil
- Cercospora liquidambaris
- Cercospora longipes - causes brown spot on sugarcane
- Cercospora longissima - found in several types of lettuce
- Cercospora malloti - found on Mallotus species in Thailand
- Cercospora mamaonis - found on papaya
- Cercospora mangiferae - causes mango leaf spot
- Cercospora medicaginis - found on alfalfa
- Cercospora melongenae
- Cercospora minima - found on pear leaves
- Cercospora minuta
- Cercospora musae - found on banana
- Cercospora nicotianae - causes "frogeye" spot on tobacco
- Cercospora odontoglossi
- Cercospora oryzae
- Cercospora papayae - found on papaya
- Cercospora penniseti - causes leaf spot on pearl millet
- Cercospora personata - causes brown or blackish leaf spots in ground nuts tikka disease
- Cercospora piaropi - see syn. C. cf. flagellaris above
- Cercospora pisa-sativae - causes leaf spot on peas
- Cercospora platanicola - found on sycamores
- Cercospora puderii
- Cercospora pulcherrima
- Cercospora rhapidicola
- Cercospora rosicola - found on roses
- Cercospora rubrotincta - found on various drupes
- Cercospora sojina - causes frogeye leaf spot on soybean
- Cercospora solani - infests potato plants
- Cercospora solani-tuberosi
- Cercospora sorghi
- Cercospora theae
- Cercospora tuberculans
- Cercospora vexans
- Cercospora vicosae
- Cercospora zeae-maydis - causes a disease in cereals called grey leaf spot
- Cercospora zebrina
- Cercospora zonata
