= Cercospora fragariae =

Scientific classification
- Kingdom: Fungi
- Division: Ascomycota
- Class: Dothideomycetes
- Order: Mycosphaerellales
- Family: Mycosphaerellaceae
- Genus: Cercospora
- Species: C. fragariae

Binomial name
- Cercospora fragariae Lobik, (1928)

Species of fungus

Cercospora leaf spot
- Causal agents: Cercospora fragariae
- Hosts: Strawberries

Cercospora fragariae is a fungal plant pathogen.

== See also ==
- List of strawberry diseases
