= Exosporium livistonicola =

Scientific classification
- Kingdom: Fungi
- Division: Ascomycota
- Class: Dothideomycetes
- Order: Mycosphaerellales
- Family: Mycosphaerellaceae
- Genus: Exosporium
- Species: E. livistonicola

Binomial name
- Exosporium livistonicola U. Braun, Videira & Crous

Synonyms
- Distocercospora livistonae U. Braun & C.F. Hill

Species of fungus

Exosporium livistonicola is a species of fungus in the family Mycosphaerellaceae. It was originally described as Distocercospora livistonae. It was reclassified in 2017 to the genus Exosporium.
