= Achorodothis =

Scientific classification
- Kingdom: Fungi
- Division: Ascomycota
- Class: Dothideomycetes
- Order: Capnodiales
- Family: Mycosphaerellaceae
- Genus: Achorodothis; Syd.

Species
- Achorodothis poasensis; Achorodothis rapaneae

Genus of fungi

Achorodothis is a genus of fungi previously identified as being in the family Mycosphaerellaceae. The taxonomic status unclear and it may be incorrectly attributed to Mycosphaerellaceae.
