= Leaf spot =

Damaged areas of leaves

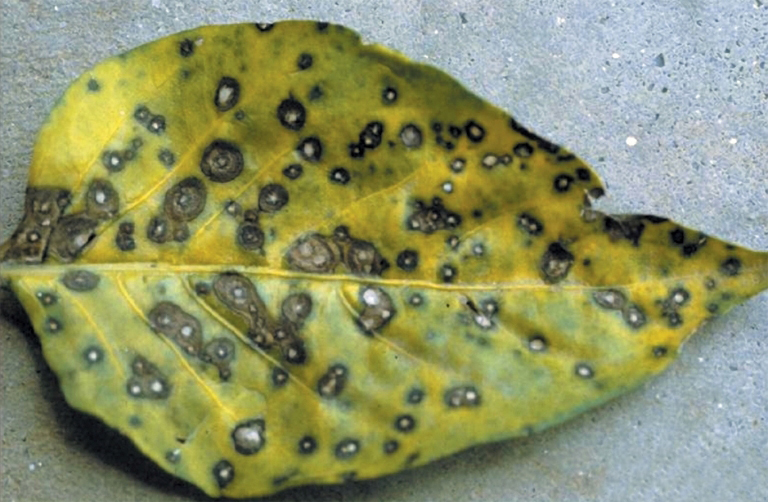
- Leaf spot caused by Cercospora capsici
- Causal agents: Fungi or bacteria
- Hosts: Plants

A leaf spot is a limited, discoloured, diseased area of a leaf that is caused by fungal, bacterial or viral plant diseases, or by injuries from nematodes, insects, environmental factors, toxicity or herbicides. These discoloured spots or lesions often have a centre of necrosis (cell death). Symptoms can overlap across causal agents, however differing signs and symptoms of certain pathogens can lead to the diagnosis of the type of leaf spot disease. Prolonged wet and humid conditions promote leaf spot disease and most pathogens are spread by wind, splashing rain or irrigation that carry the disease to other leaves.

== Description ==
Leaf spots are a type of plant disease that are usually caused by pathogens and sometimes other cases such as herbicide injuries. Leaf spots can vary in size, shape, and color depending on the age and type of the cause or pathogen. Plants, shrubs and trees are weakened by the spots on the leaves as they reduce available foliar space for photosynthesis. Other forms of leaf spot diseases include leaf rust, downy mildew and blights. Although leaf spot diseases can affect a small percentage of the host's leaves, more severe consequences of leaf spot disease results in moderate to complete loss of leaves.

== Causes ==
The causes of leaf spots are mainly from fungi, bacteria, and viruses. However leaf spots may also be caused by abiotic factors such as environmental conditions, toxicities and herbicide injuries. Foliar nematodes are another cause of leaf spots where the saliva injected into the cell walls during feeding results in the affected cells to discolour and become lesions. Aphelenchoides are common foliar nematodes which produce angular leaf spots. The Aphelenchoides ritzemabosi affects chrysanthemum and other plants such as dry beans and bird's nest fern, and the Aphelenchoides fragariae affects strawberry and other ornamentals ferns.

=== Fungi ===
Foliar diseases such as leaf spots are commonly caused by ascomycetes and so-called deuteromycetes (mitosporic fungi).

Common Ascomycetes that cause leaf spot disease:
Ascomycetes	Cause and Host
Cochliobolus	Leaf spot on most grasses, and cereals.
Blumeriella (Higginsia)	Leaf spot on cherries and plums.
Magnaporthe, M. grisea	Grey leaf spot of cereals and turf grasses.
Elytroderma deformans	Leaf spot of pines.
Mycosphaerella fragariae	Leaf spot of strawberry.
Pseudopeziza	Leaf spot of alfafa and clovers.
Pyrenophora	Leaf spot on many cereals and grasses.
Cercospora	Reddish lesions at first then enlarges and becomes white to light brown in the centre. Circular and varying in size. Can appear concentric with red margins. Leaf spot on most cereals and grasses, field crops, vegetables, ornamentals, and trees.
Myrothecium roridum	Target-like spots with light brown centres and dark circumference on Gardenia augusta, New Guinea Impatiens, Begonia species, and Gloxinia, and pansy. Distinctive dark green and black spore producing bodies edged by white hyphae occurs in lesions.

Common Deuteromycetes that cause leaf spot disease:
Deuteromycetes	Cause and Host
Alternaria	Small water-soaked lesions, maturing into sunken and brown spots with or without a yellow halo. May show concentric rings with purple margins. Necrotic tissue may fall out to appear shot-holed. Leaf spot on many plants and crops.
Septoria	Small brown spots, that turns light tan to white in the centre. Leaf spot on many crops
Bipolaris	Leaf spot on grasses
Drechslera	Leaf spot on grasses
Exserohilium	Leaf spot on grasses
Curvularia	Leaf spot on grasses
Cylindrosporium	Leaf spot on many plants
Colletotrichum, Gloeosporium (anthracnose)	Brown and necrotic spots on many plants including Anemone coronaria, Begonia species, Dahlia hybrids, Poinsettia, Gardenia augusta, Hibiscus, geranium.

=== Bacteria ===
The most common cause of bacterial leaf spots are by bacteria in the genera Pseudomonas and Xanthomonas. For example, Pseudomonas syringae pv. tabaci is known to cause angular leaf spots of cucumber, Pseudomonas syringae pv. phaseolicola to cause bean leaf spot and Xanthomonas campestris pv. phaseoli, angular leaf spot of cotton.

=== Virus ===
Whilst other pathogenic causes such as fungi and bacteria induce leaf spot disease by way of enzymes, toxins and spores, virus infections affect the host by means of synthesising new proteins that are biologically active substances such as enzymes which may sabotage the metabolism of the host. Viruses can inhibit chlorophyll development in leaves and the lack of photosynthetic activity can cause yellowing and chlorosis. Viruses inducing low levels of carbohydrates in plant tissues can result in mosaic diseases. Viral leaf spot diseases include the Apple chlorotic leaf-spot virus from the genus Trichovirus, Tospoviruses, and Coconut cadang-cadang viroid.

=== Herbicide ===
Leaf spots may also be from injuries made by herbicides coming in contact with the plant. A low rate of contact from nitrile and pyridazine herbicides, can result in spotting or speckling of the plant's foliage. Diphenylether herbicides can result in reddish-colour spots shortly after application. Accurate identification of leaf spot disease is needed as to distinguish signs of illness from damage done by herbicides.

== Symptoms ==
=== Fungi ===
Leaf spots caused by fungi occur due to the necrosis of plant tissues. These necrotic lesions, localised in area and shape, consist of dead and collapsed cells of the host leaves. One distinct feature of fungal infections is that there may be visible spores in the centre of leaf spots. Fungal leaf spots often have a brown, black, tan or reddish centre with a darker margin and vary in size.

=== Bacteria ===
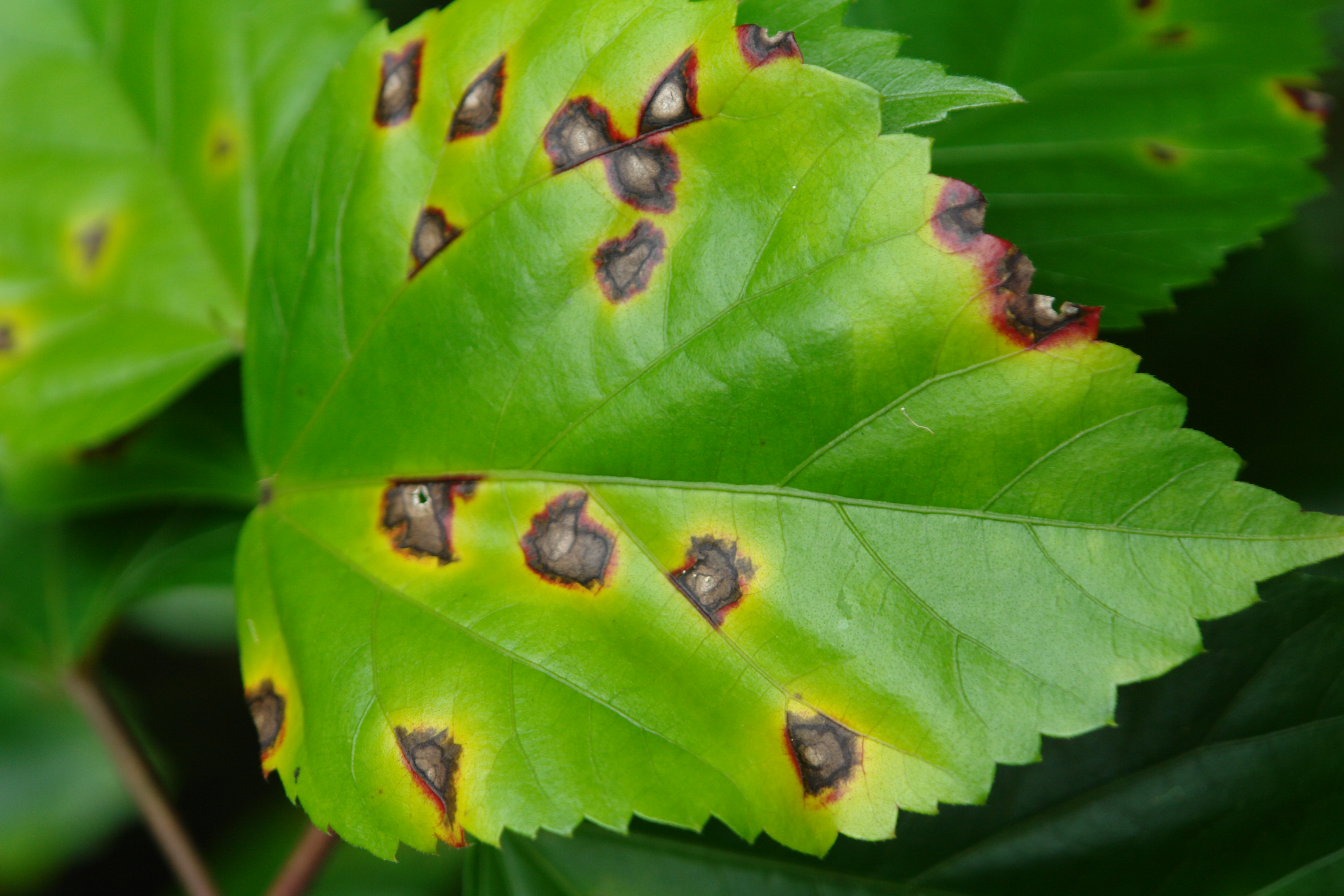
Bacterial leaf spot caused by Pseudomonas cichorii on a hibiscus leaf

Bacterial leaf spots show as necrotic, circular or angular lesions and may have a yellowish outline or halo Early symptoms of bacterial leaf spots show on older leaves and lesions appear water-soaked. Bacterial spots affecting dicytyledounous plants that have net-like leaf veins sometimes take a more angular shape as they are restricted by the large leaf veins. Bacterial spots on monocotyledonous plants with parallel leaf veins have a streak or striped appearance. The most obvious symptom of bacterial leaf spots are the blackening of the spots after infection. Eventually older lesions dry out and become papery in texture. Bacterial spots can also produce white, yellow, light cream or silver bacterial exudate depending on the type of bacteria, which may ooze from splitting lesions and/or from the underside of the spots.

Bacterial leaf spots caused by Pseudomonas show red-brown spots which can distort the infected leaves, whilst those caused by Xanthomonas are angular or circular in shape outlined with a yellow halo.

=== Virus ===
Leaf spots are visible symptoms of virus infections on plants, and are referred to as systemic symptoms. In systematic virus infections leaf spots caused by viruses show a loss of green colour in leaves, due to chlorosis which is a repression of chlorophyll development. Leaves may yellow and have a mottled green or yellow appearance, show mosaic (e.g. chlorotic spotting) and ringspots (chlorotic or necrotic rings). However, there are no signs of the viral pathogen itself, as compared to visible spores of fungal pathogens and bacterial ooze or water-soaked lesions of bacterial spots as the viruses are difficult to see and requires an electron microscope for detection.

=== Effect on transpiration ===
Transpiration increases in affected plants. This is because in leaf spots, the plant cuticle, epidermis, and cell tissues, including the xylem may be destroyed in the infected areas. The cuticle protects the leaf and the destruction of these cell tissues results in an uncontrollable loss of water from the affected areas. This can result in wilting of leaves.

=== Effect on plant growth ===
Leaf spots reduce the surface area available on leaves for photosynthesis and so can result in smaller growth and yield of plants. Weakened plants may produce lesser fruit. Virus caused leaf spots reduces chlorophyll in the leaves, resulting in less photosynthetic activity. This can lead to smaller leaves and blossoms, smaller growth and reduced yield.

== Disease cycle ==
Leaf spot disease occurs when the following factors are all present: favourable environmental conditions, a pathogenic agent, and susceptible host. Different types of pathogens, including fungal, bacterial and viral agents have unique ways to suppress and attack the host plant's immune system, thereby resulting in the progression of leaf spot disease. Knowing the disease cycle of each microbial agent also helps in managing leaf spot disease.

Fungal leaf spot pathogens follow the path of attaching to the plant surface, germinating via spores and entering into the host tissue. Colonisation of the host tissue follows and then the expression of symptoms. Usually fungi will overwinter on fallen leaves, or buds, branches and fruits, then in the warmer early spring to summer months produce spores during the germination process, on the exterior of leaves, as well as exist as pycnidia, acervuli and perithecia, within the affected leaf tissue.

Viruses can survive in cells that have been infected by the viral agent called alternate hosts. For infection to occur virus replication needs to happen, and in doing so uses the host cell's products, disrupting cell processes. Horizontal transmission of viral pathogens include dispersal through touching of nearby infected leaves and through root systems or through vectors for more distant hosts. Vertical transmission occurs by inheriting the virus from the parent host plant.

Bacterial pathogens survive in infected plants, plant debris, seed and soil. Infection occurs when the bacteria enter into wounds, or by natural entry (cell adhesion), under favourable warm and moist conditions.

=== Dispersion ===
Pathogens can be dispersed by the wind that can lift nematode eggs, insects, and many tiny fungal spores as well as bacterial cells by air currents. Animal and insect vectors are another way in which fungal, bacterial and viral leaf spot diseases are spread.

Rainwater spreads pathogens by transporting infested soil into areas that are disease-free. Infested water can also be spread by way of irrigation or transplanting. Blowing rain can also spread fungi and bacteria. Splashing water can also spread pathogens from the soil to leaf and amongst leaves.

Plant material can also be the cause of leaf spot disease. These include infected seeds, transplants and discarded culls and leaves. Tools used by humans and worker's hands during transplants, watering, and market practices can contribute to the dispersal of leaf spot pathogens.

== Management ==
Certain chemicals are used to treat leaf spot disease, such as the Bordeaux mixture, the first fungicide to have been developed, which treats many fungal and bacterial leaf spots. Other fungicides such as zineb, chlorothalonil and Captan, also treat leaf spot disease and Benomyl specifically treats Cercospora leaf spots, cherry leaf spot and black spot of roses. Thiabendazole is used to treat leaf spot diseases of turf and ornamentals. Both fenarimol and nuarimol are pyrimidines that also treats leaf spot disease. More chemicals include Triazoles an organosphosphate fungicide, Imazalil, Procholora and Fentin hydroxide. Registered fungicides in use are thiophanate methyl, chlorothalonil, ferban and mancozeb.

These chemicals can be applied as foliar sprays, seed and soil treatments or as post-harvest treatment.

Strains of plant pathogenic bacteria becoming resistant to chemicals contributes to the difficulty of managing bacterial leaf spot disease. An example is Xanthomanos vesicatoria, which causes bacterial spot of tomato and pepper, that is now resistant to streptomycin. Apart from chemicals, alternative management methods include using bacteriophages, bacteriocins, and heat therapy.

Diversity in plant species has also been found to reduce the prevalence of leaf spot disease. The host-specific characteristic of many leaf spot pathogens makes diversity in plant species a way to reduce and regulate leaf spot pathogen infection levels within plant populations.

Prevention of leaf spot disease includes variety selection, crop rotations, plant hygiene and fungicide use for seeds and foliage. To stop the spread of pathogens good sanitation is key as well as the avoidance of handling plants when wet, planting pathogen-free and resistant cultivars and moving out infected plants. Reducing the humidity around plants and in greenhouses by good plant spacing for air circulation, and watering early in the day can also help prevent leaf spot disease. Disinfection of tools and washing of hands is important when handling infected plants. Susceptibility to leaf spot disease can occur due to insufficient or excessive fertilising of plants. Checking plants periodically for any signs and symptoms of disease is also good practice. Avoiding overhead watering and increasing air circulation by pruning plants should be done to prevent humid conditions. Collecting and removing fallen leaves is important in reducing the amount of pathogenic agents on the ground to prevent dispersal of disease.

Fungicides should be used only when necessary, and if applied, early before the leaf spot disease progresses. Chemical control is necessary for severe leaf spotting and defoliation occurring over several years.

== See also ==
- Alternaria leaf spot, a plant fungal disease caused by Alternaria alternata
