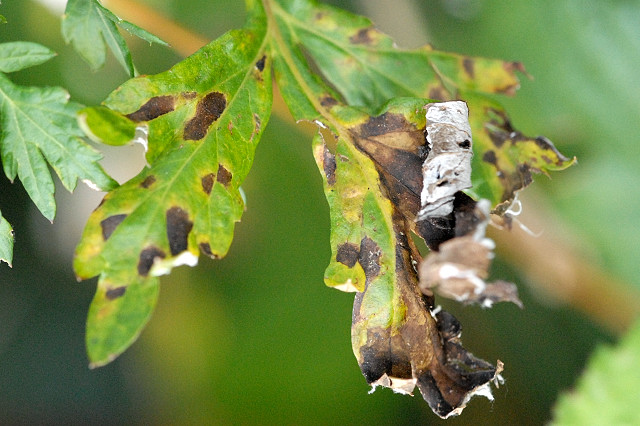
- Rot from Septoria artemisiae

Scientific classification
- Kingdom: Fungi
- Division: Ascomycota
- Class: Dothideomycetes
- Order: Mycosphaerellales
- Family: Mycosphaerellaceae; Lindau (1897)

Type genus
- Mycosphaerella Johanson (1884)

= Mycosphaerellaceae =

Family of sac fungi

The Mycosphaerellaceae are a family of sac fungi. They affect many common plants, such as eucalyptus, the myrtle family, and the Proteaceae. They have a widespread distribution.

As of September 2026, the family contains 189 genera and 7115 species.

== Taxonomy ==
The following genera are included in this family:

- Acervuloseptoria Crous & Jol. Roux (2)
- Achorodothis Syd. (unresolved)
- Amycosphaerella Quaedvl. & Crous (2)
- Annellosympodiella Crous & Assefa (1)
- Apseudocercosporella Videira & Crous (1)
- Asperisporium Maubl. (24)
- Australosphaerella Videira & Crous (1)
- Brunneosphaerella Crous (3)
- Brunswickiella Videira & Crous (1)
- Camptomeriphila Crous & M.J. Wingf. (1)
- Caryophylloseptoria Verkley, Quaedvl. & Crous (4)
- Catenulocercospora C. Nakash., Videira & Crous (1)
- Cercoramularia Videira, H.D. Shin, C. Nakash. & Crous (1)
- Cercospora Fresen. (ca. 1125)
- Cercosporella Sacc. (ca. 100)
- Cercosporidium Earle (ca. 10)
- Chuppomyces Videira & Crous (1)
- Clarohilum Videira & Crous (1)
- Clypeosphaerella Guatim., R.W. Barreto & Crous (3)
- Collapsimycopappus A. Hashim., Y. Harada & Kaz. Tanaka (1)
- Collarispora Videira & Crous (1)
- Coremiopassalora U. Braun, C. Nakash., Videira & Crous (2)
- Cytostagonospora Bubák (5)
- Deightonomyces Videira & Crous (1)
- Devonomyces Videira & Crous (1)
- Dictyosporina L.M. Abreu, R.F. Castañeda & O.L. Pereira (1)
- Distocercospora N. Pons & B. Sutton (4)
- Distocercosporaster Videira, H.D. Shin, C. Nakash. & Crous (1)
- Distomycovellosiella U. Braun, C. Nakash., Videira & Crous (1)
- Dothistroma Hulbary (5)
- Epicoleosporium Videira & Crous (1)
- Exopassalora Videira & Crous (1)
- Exosporium Link (123)
- Exutisphaerella Videira & Crous (1)
- Filiella Videira & Crous (1)
- Fulvia Cif. (2)
- Fusoidiella Videira & Crous (2)
- Graminopassalora U. Braun, C. Nakash., Videira & Crous (1)
- Hyalocercosporidium Videira & Crous (1)
- Hyalozasmidium U. Braun, C. Nakash., Videira & Crous (2)
- Janetia M.B. Ellis (22)
- Lecanosticta Syd. (8)
- Madagascaromyces U. Braun, C. Nakash., Videira & Crous (1)
- Microcyclosporella J. Frank, Schroers & Crous (1)
- Micronematomyces U. Braun, C. Nakash., Videira & Crous (2)
- Miuraea Hara (1)
- Mycodiella Crous (3)
- Mycosphaerella Johanson (1263)
- Mycosphaerelloides Videira & Crous (1)
- Mycovellosiella Rangel (ca. 34)
- Neoceratosperma Crous & Cheew. (6)
- Neocercospora Bakhshi, Arzanlou, Babai-ahari & Crous (1)
- Neocercosporidium Videira & Crous (1)
- Neodeightoniella Crous & W.J. Swart (1)
- Neomycosphaerella Crous (1)
- Neopenidiella Quaedvl. & Crous (1)
- Neophloeospora U. Braun, C. Nakash., Videira & Crous (1)
- Neopseudocercospora Crous (2)
- Neopseudocercosporella Videira & Crous (2)
- Neoramichloridium Phook., Thambug. & K.D. Hyde (1)
- Neoseptoria Quaedvl., Verkley & Crous (1)
- Nothopassalora U. Braun, C. Nakash., Videira & Crous (1)
- Nothopericoniella Videira & Crous (1)
- Nothophaeocryptopus Videira, C. Nakash. & Crous (1)
- Pachyramichloridium Videira & Crous (1)
- Pallidocercospora Crous (9)
- Pantospora Cif. (1)
- Paracercospora Deighton (5)
- Paracercosporidium Videira & Crous (2)
- Paramycosphaerella Crous & Jol. Roux (17)
- Paramycovellosiella Videira, H.D. Shin & Crous (1)
- Parapallidocercospora Videira, Crous, U. Braun & C. Nakash. (2)
- Passalora Fr. (ca. 250)
- Phaeocercospora Crous (2)
- Phaeophleospora Rangel (31)
- Phaeoramularia Munt.-Cvetk. (ca. 10)
- Phloeospora Wallr. (141)
- Piricauda Bubák (31)
- Pleopassalora Videira & Crous (2)
- Pleuropassalora U. Braun, C. Nakash., Videira & Crous (1)
- Pluripassalora Videira & Crous (1)
- Plurivorosphaerella O. Hassan & T.H. Chang (1)
- Polyphialoseptoria Quaedvl., R.W. Barreto, Verkley & Crous (2)
- Polythrincium Kunze (5)
- Protostegia Cooke (2)
- Pseudocercospora Speg. (ca. 1000)
- Pseudocercosporella Deighton (127)
- Pseudopericoniella Videira & Crous (1)
- Pseudophaeophleospora C. Nakash., Videira & Crous (2)
- Pseudozasmidium Videira & Crous (4)
- Ragnhildiana Solheim (18)
- Ramularia Unger (100<)
- Ramulariopsis Speg. (4)
- Ramulispora Miura (18)
- Rhachisphaerella U. Braun, C. Nakash., Videira & Crous (1)
- Rosisphaerella Videira & Crous (1)
- Ruptoseptoria Quaedvl., Verkley & Crous (1)
- Scolecostigmina U. Braun (23)
- Septoria Sacc. (includes Septocyta Petr. fide Quaedvlieg et al. 2013) (200<)
- Sonderhenia H.J. Swart & J. Walker (2)
- Sphaerulina Sacc. (65)
- Stromatoseptoria Quaedvl., Verkley & Crous (1)
- Sultanimyces Videira & Crous (1)
- Trochophora R.T. Moore (2)
- Uwemyces Hern.-Restr., Sarria & Crous (1)
- Virosphaerella Videira & Crous (3)
- Xenomycosphaerella Quaedvl. & Crous (3)
- Xenopassalora Crous (1)
- Xenoramularia Videira, H.D. Shin & Crous (3)
- Xenosonderhenia Crous (2)
- Xenosonderhenioides Videira & Crous (1)
- Zasmidium Fr. (includes Periconiella Sacc. fide Quaedvlieg et al. 2013) (ca. 150)
- Zymoseptoria Quaedvl. & Crous (8)
