= List of Mycosphaerella species =

This is a list of fungi species belonging to the genus Mycosphaerella. The genus includes at least 10,000 species.

== A ==
- Mycosphaerella abutilontidicola
- Mycosphaerella acaciae
- Mycosphaerella acaciigena
- Mycosphaerella acanthopanacis
- Mycosphaerella aceris
- Mycosphaerella acerna
- Mycosphaerella achilleae
- Mycosphaerella acicola
- Mycosphaerella acilegna
- Mycosphaerella aconitorum
- Mycosphaerella acori
- Mycosphaerella acrocomiicola
- Mycosphaerella actaeae
- Mycosphaerella actinidiae
- Mycosphaerella adenophorae
- Mycosphaerella adhatodae
- Mycosphaerella adonidina
- Mycosphaerella advena
- Mycosphaerella aeluropodis
- Mycosphaerella aequatoriensis
- Mycosphaerella aesculi
- Mycosphaerella aethiops
- Mycosphaerella afghanica
- Mycosphaerella africana
- Mycosphaerella agapanthi
- Mycosphaerella agapanthi-umbellati
- Mycosphaerella agaves
- Mycosphaerella aggregata
- Mycosphaerella agostinii
- Mycosphaerella agrimoniae
- Mycosphaerella agrostistachydis
- Mycosphaerella ailanthi
- Mycosphaerella airicola
- Mycosphaerella alarum
- Mycosphaerella alba
- Mycosphaerella albescens
- Mycosphaerella albiziae
- Mycosphaerella albocrustata
- Mycosphaerella alchemillae
- Mycosphaerella alchemillicola
- Mycosphaerella aleuritidicola
- Mycosphaerella aleuritis
- Mycosphaerella algarbiensis
- Mycosphaerella algida
- Mycosphaerella aliena
- Mycosphaerella alismatis
- Mycosphaerella allicina
- Mycosphaerella allii-cepae
- Mycosphaerella alnicola
- Mycosphaerella alni-viridis
- Mycosphaerella alnobetulae
- Mycosphaerella alocasiae
- Mycosphaerella aloës
- Mycosphaerella alpina
- Mycosphaerella alpiniae
- Mycosphaerella alpiniicola
- Mycosphaerella alsophila
- Mycosphaerella altera
- Mycosphaerella althaeina
- Mycosphaerella alyssi
- Mycosphaerella alyxiae
- Mycosphaerella ambiens
- Mycosphaerella ambigua
- Mycosphaerella ambiphyllus
- Mycosphaerella amomi
- Mycosphaerella anacardiicola
- Mycosphaerella andersonii
- Mycosphaerella andicola
- Mycosphaerella andirae
- Mycosphaerella andrewsii
- Mycosphaerella andromedae
- Mycosphaerella anethi
- Mycosphaerella angelicae
- Mycosphaerella argentinensis
- Mycosphaerella angophorae
- Mycosphaerella angulata
- Mycosphaerella angustifoliorum
- Mycosphaerella annulata
- Mycosphaerella antarctica
- Mycosphaerella anthemidina
- Mycosphaerella anthurii
- Mycosphaerella antoniana
- Mycosphaerella antonovii
- Mycosphaerella aphyuanthis
- Mycosphaerella apiahyna
- Mycosphaerella apocynica
- Mycosphaerella applanata
- Mycosphaerella apula
- Mycosphaerella aquatica
- Mycosphaerella aquilegiae
- Mycosphaerella aquilegiae-jonesii
- Mycosphaerella aquilina
- Mycosphaerella arachidis
- Mycosphaerella arachnoidea
- Mycosphaerella araliae
- Mycosphaerella araucariae
- Mycosphaerella arbuticola
- Mycosphaerella arbutifoliae
- Mycosphaerella arctica
- Mycosphaerella ardisiae
- Mycosphaerella arenariicola
- Mycosphaerella areola
- Mycosphaerella aretiae
- Mycosphaerella aristolochiae
- Mycosphaerella aronici
- Mycosphaerella artemisiae
- Mycosphaerella artraxonicola
- Mycosphaerella artocarpi
- Mycosphaerella arundinariae
- Mycosphaerella asclepiadis
- Mycosphaerella asensioi
- Mycosphaerella asiminae
- Mycosphaerella asparagi
- Mycosphaerella asperifolii
- Mycosphaerella asperulata
- Mycosphaerella asphodelina
- Mycosphaerella aspidii
- Mycosphaerella asplenii
- Mycosphaerella asterinoides
- Mycosphaerella asteroma
- Mycosphaerella astragali
- Mycosphaerella astragalina
- Mycosphaerella asunciensis
- Mycosphaerella athamantae
- Mycosphaerella atichiae
- Mycosphaerella atomus
- Mycosphaerella atractyloidis
- Mycosphaerella atropae
- Mycosphaerella aucubae
- Mycosphaerella aucupariae
- Mycosphaerella auerswaldii
- Mycosphaerella aurantia
- Mycosphaerella aurantiorum

== B ==
- Mycosphaerella babjaniae
- Mycosphaerella baccharidiphila
- Mycosphaerella bacillifera
- Mycosphaerella badensis
- Mycosphaerella bakeri
- Mycosphaerella balansae
- Mycosphaerella balcanica
- Mycosphaerella baldensis
- Mycosphaerella balsamopopuli
- Mycosphaerella balsamorrhizae
- Mycosphaerella bambusae
- Mycosphaerella bambusicola
- Mycosphaerella bambusifolia
- Mycosphaerella bambusina
- Mycosphaerella banksiae
- Mycosphaerella baptisiicola
- Mycosphaerella barnadesiae
- Mycosphaerella baudysiana
- Mycosphaerella bauhiniae
- Mycosphaerella baumaea
- Mycosphaerella beaglensis
- Mycosphaerella belladonnae
- Mycosphaerella bellona
- Mycosphaerella bellula
- Mycosphaerella benguetensis
- Mycosphaerella berberidis
- Mycosphaerella berkeleyi
- Mycosphaerella berlesiana
- Mycosphaerella bhandardarensis
- Mycosphaerella biguttulata
- Mycosphaerella bixae
- Mycosphaerella bolleana
- Mycosphaerella bombycina
- Mycosphaerella bonae-noctis
- Mycosphaerella borealis
- Mycosphaerella borreriae
- Mycosphaerella botrychii
- Mycosphaerella brachycomes
- Mycosphaerella bracteophila
- Mycosphaerella braheae
- Mycosphaerella brassicicola
- Mycosphaerella brideliae
- Mycosphaerella brionnensis
- Mycosphaerella brunnea
- Mycosphaerella brunneola
- Mycosphaerella brunneomaculans
- Mycosphaerella buckinghamiae
- Mycosphaerella bulgarica
- Mycosphaerella bumeliae
- Mycosphaerella buna
- Mycosphaerella bupleuri
- Mycosphaerella bupleurina
- Mycosphaerella burnatii
- Mycosphaerella buxicola
- Mycosphaerella byliana
- Mycosphaerella byrsonimae

== C ==
- Mycosphaerella cacaliae
- Mycosphaerella calamagrostidis
- Mycosphaerella calamagrostis
- Mycosphaerella calceoli
- Mycosphaerella californica
- Mycosphaerella calopogonii
- Mycosphaerella calotropidis
- Mycosphaerella calycanthi
- Mycosphaerella calycicola
- Mycosphaerella camarae
- Mycosphaerella camelliae
- Mycosphaerella camphorosmae
- Mycosphaerella campoi
- Mycosphaerella canariensis
- Mycosphaerella canavaliae
- Mycosphaerella canephorae
- Mycosphaerella cannabis
- Mycosphaerella capparis
- Mycosphaerella capreolatae
- Mycosphaerella capronii
- Mycosphaerella caricae
- Mycosphaerella caricis
- Mycosphaerella carinthiaca
- Mycosphaerella carniolica
- Mycosphaerella caroliniana
- Mycosphaerella carphae
- Mycosphaerella carpogena
- Mycosphaerella caryigena
- Mycosphaerella caryophyllata
- Mycosphaerella caryophylli
- Mycosphaerella cassiae
- Mycosphaerella cassinopsidis
- Mycosphaerella cassiopes
- Mycosphaerella castaneicola
- Mycosphaerella castanopsidis
- Mycosphaerella castillae
- Mycosphaerella castilleyae
- Mycosphaerella caulicola
- Mycosphaerella cecropiae
- Mycosphaerella cedrelae
- Mycosphaerella celtidis
- Mycosphaerella centellae
- Mycosphaerella cephalanthae
- Mycosphaerella cerasella
- Mycosphaerella cerasicola
- Mycosphaerella cercidicola
- Mycosphaerella cercidis
- Mycosphaerella cerei
- Mycosphaerella cesatiana
- Mycosphaerella chaenomelis
- Mycosphaerella chamaemori
- Mycosphaerella chamaenerii
- Mycosphaerella chamaeropis
- Mycosphaerella chardonii
- Mycosphaerella chaubattiensis
- Mycosphaerella chelidonii
- Mycosphaerella chenopodii
- Mycosphaerella chenopodiicola
- Mycosphaerella chimaphilina
- Mycosphaerella chlorina
- Mycosphaerella chlorogali
- Mycosphaerella chlorinensis
- Mycosphaerella chrysanthemi
- Mycosphaerella chrysobalani
- Mycosphaerella chrysobalanicola
- Mycosphaerella ciliata
- Mycosphaerella cinnafolia
- Mycosphaerella cinnamomicola
- Mycosphaerella circe
- Mycosphaerella circumdans
- Mycosphaerella cirsii
- Mycosphaerella cirsii-arvensis
- Mycosphaerella citri
- Mycosphaerella citricola
- Mycosphaerella citrigena
- Mycosphaerella cladii
- Mycosphaerella clallamensis
- Mycosphaerella clematidina
- Mycosphaerella cleyerae
- Mycosphaerella clidemiae
- Mycosphaerella clusiae
- Mycosphaerella clymenia
- Mycosphaerella coacervata
- Mycosphaerella cocoës
- Mycosphaerella coerulea
- Mycosphaerella coffeae
- Mycosphaerella coffeicola
- Mycosphaerella coggyriae
- Mycosphaerella collina
- Mycosphaerella colocasiae
- Mycosphaerella colombiensis
- Mycosphaerella colorata
- Mycosphaerella columbariae
- Mycosphaerella columbi
- Mycosphaerella columbiae
- Mycosphaerella communis
- Mycosphaerella confinis
- Mycosphaerella confusa
- Mycosphaerella conglomerata
- Mycosphaerella conglomeratiformis
- Mycosphaerella conigena
- Mycosphaerella conspicua
- Mycosphaerella contraria
- Mycosphaerella convallariae
- Mycosphaerella convexula
- Mycosphaerella coptis
- Mycosphaerella cordata
- Mycosphaerella cordylinicola
- Mycosphaerella corispermi
- Mycosphaerella corni
- Mycosphaerella cornicola
- Mycosphaerella coronillae-variae
- Mycosphaerella corylina
- Mycosphaerella costii
- Mycosphaerella cotoneastri
- Mycosphaerella coymiana
- Mycosphaerella crataegi
- Mycosphaerella crataegicola
- Mycosphaerella craterispermi
- Mycosphaerella crepidophora
- Mycosphaerella crietiana
- Mycosphaerella crini
- Mycosphaerella cruchetii
- Mycosphaerella cruciatae
- Mycosphaerella cruciferarum
- Mycosphaerella cruenta
- Mycosphaerella cryptica
- Mycosphaerella crystallinus
- Mycosphaerella crystallina
- Mycosphaerella cuboniana
- Mycosphaerella cunninghamiae
- Mycosphaerella cunninghamii
- Mycosphaerella cupaniae
- Mycosphaerella cuprea
- Mycosphaerella curvulata
- Mycosphaerella cussoniae
- Mycosphaerella cuttsiae
- Mycosphaerella cyaneae
- Mycosphaerella cydoniae
- Mycosphaerella cynodontis
- Mycosphaerella cyparissiae
- Mycosphaerella cyparissincola
- Mycosphaerella cyperi
- Mycosphaerella cypripedii

== D ==
- Mycosphaerella dacrydii
- Mycosphaerella dactylidis
- Mycosphaerella dahliae
- Mycosphaerella dalbergiae
- Mycosphaerella dalmatica
- Mycosphaerella danaeae
- Mycosphaerella danica
- Mycosphaerella danubialis
- Mycosphaerella daphnes
- Mycosphaerella daphniphylli
- Mycosphaerella dauci
- Mycosphaerella daviesiae
- Mycosphaerella daviesiicola
- Mycosphaerella davisii
- Mycosphaerella davisoniella
- Mycosphaerella dealbans
- Mycosphaerella dearnessii
- Mycosphaerella decidua
- Mycosphaerella degeneri
- Mycosphaerella deightonii
- Mycosphaerella dejanira
- Mycosphaerella delegatensis
- Mycosphaerella delphinii
- Mycosphaerella delphiniicola
- Mycosphaerella dendrobii-nobilis
- Mycosphaerella dendroides
- Mycosphaerella dendromeconis
- Mycosphaerella denigrans
- Mycosphaerella dennettiae
- Mycosphaerella densa
- Mycosphaerella depazeiformis
- Mycosphaerella depressa
- Mycosphaerella deschampsiae
- Mycosphaerella desmazieri
- Mycosphaerella desmodii
- Mycosphaerella desmodiifolii
- Mycosphaerella deutziae
- Mycosphaerella devia
- Mycosphaerella dianellae
- Mycosphaerella dianellincola
- Mycosphaerella dianthi
- Mycosphaerella dichrostachydis
- Mycosphaerella dictamni
- Mycosphaerella didymelloides
- Mycosphaerella didymopanacis
- Mycosphaerella dieffenbachiae
- Mycosphaerella digitalis
- Mycosphaerella digitalis-ambiguae
- Mycosphaerella dioscoreae
- Mycosphaerella dioscoreicola
- Mycosphaerella diospyri
- Mycosphaerella discophora
- Mycosphaerella disseminata
- Mycosphaerella ditissima
- Mycosphaerella dodartiae
- Mycosphaerella dodonaeae
- Mycosphaerella dolichospora
- Mycosphaerella dominicana
- Mycosphaerella donacis
- Mycosphaerella dracocephali
- Mycosphaerella dracocephalicola
- Mycosphaerella droserae
- Mycosphaerella dryadicola
- Mycosphaerella drymariae
- Mycosphaerella dubia
- Mycosphaerella dummeri
- Mycosphaerella dunbariae

== E ==
- Mycosphaerella earliana
- Mycosphaerella ebuli
- Mycosphaerella ebulina
- Mycosphaerella ecdysantherae
- Mycosphaerella edelbergii
- Mycosphaerella effigurata
- Mycosphaerella elaeagnicola
- Mycosphaerella elaeidis
- Mycosphaerella elastica
- Mycosphaerella elatior
- Mycosphaerella elatostemmatis
- Mycosphaerella ellipsoidea
- Mycosphaerella elodis
- Mycosphaerella elymi
- Mycosphaerella embothrii
- Mycosphaerella emeri
- Mycosphaerella endophytica
- Mycosphaerella endospermi
- Mycosphaerella engleriana
- Mycosphaerella entadae
- Mycosphaerella enteleae
- Mycosphaerella ephedrae
- Mycosphaerella ephedricola
- Mycosphaerella epilobii
- Mycosphaerella epilobii-montani
- Mycosphaerella epimedii
- Mycosphaerella epiphylla
- Mycosphaerella equiseti
- Mycosphaerella equiseticola
- Mycosphaerella equisetina
- Mycosphaerella eragrostidis
- Mycosphaerella erechthitidina
- Mycosphaerella ericae-ciliaris
- Mycosphaerella eriodendri
- Mycosphaerella eriophila
- Mycosphaerella eryngii
- Mycosphaerella eryngiicola
- Mycosphaerella eryngina
- Mycosphaerella erysiphoides
- Mycosphaerella erythrinae
- Mycosphaerella erythrinicola
- Mycosphaerella erythroxyli
- Mycosphaerella escalloniae
- Mycosphaerella eucalypti
- Mycosphaerella eucalyptorum
- Mycosphaerella eugeniae
- Mycosphaerella eugenicola
- Mycosphaerella eulaliae
- Mycosphaerella eumusae
- Mycosphaerella euodiae
- Mycosphaerella eupatorii
- Mycosphaerella eupatoriicola
- Mycosphaerella euphorbiae
- Mycosphaerella euphorbiae-canariensis
- Mycosphaerella euphorbiae-exiquae
- Mycosphaerella euryae
- Mycosphaerella eurypotami
- Mycosphaerella evernia
- Mycosphaerella exaci
- Mycosphaerella exarida
- Mycosphaerella exigua

== F ==
- Mycosphaerella fagi
- Mycosphaerella fagraeae
- Mycosphaerella falcariae
- Mycosphaerella feijoae
- Mycosphaerella fendleri
- Mycosphaerella fennica
- Mycosphaerella ferulae
- Mycosphaerella fibrillosa
- Mycosphaerella fici-ovatae
- Mycosphaerella fici-wightianae
- Mycosphaerella ficophila
- Mycosphaerella ficus
- Mycosphaerella fijiensis
- Mycosphaerella filicum
- Mycosphaerella filipendulae
- Mycosphaerella filipendulae-denudatae
- Mycosphaerella firmianae
- Mycosphaerella flagellariae
- Mycosphaerella flageoletiana
- Mycosphaerella flexuosa
- Mycosphaerella foeniculi
- Mycosphaerella foeniculicola
- Mycosphaerella foeniculina
- Mycosphaerella fori
- Mycosphaerella formosana
- Mycosphaerella fragariae
- Mycosphaerella frankeniae
- Mycosphaerella frauxii
- Mycosphaerella fraxini
- Mycosphaerella fraxinicola
- Mycosphaerella frenumbensis
- Mycosphaerella freycinetiae
- Mycosphaerella friesii
- Mycosphaerella fruticum
- Mycosphaerella fuchsiicola
- Mycosphaerella fuiiensis
- Mycosphaerella fumaginea
- Mycosphaerella fusca
- Mycosphaerella fushinoki

== G ==
- Mycosphaerella galanthina
- Mycosphaerella galatellae
- Mycosphaerella galegae
- Mycosphaerella galii
- Mycosphaerella galii-elliptici
- Mycosphaerella gallae
- Mycosphaerella gamsii
- Mycosphaerella garciniae
- Mycosphaerella gardeniae
- Mycosphaerella garganica
- Mycosphaerella gastonis
- Mycosphaerella gaubae
- Mycosphaerella gaultheriae
- Mycosphaerella gaveensis
- Mycosphaerella gentianae
- Mycosphaerella gibsonii
- Mycosphaerella glauca
- Mycosphaerella glechomae
- Mycosphaerella gleicheniae
- Mycosphaerella glochidionis
- Mycosphaerella glycosmae
- Mycosphaerella glycyrrhizae
- Mycosphaerella gneticola
- Mycosphaerella gordoniae
- Mycosphaerella gossypina
- Mycosphaerella gracilis
- Mycosphaerella graeca
- Mycosphaerella graminicola
- Mycosphaerella graminis
- Mycosphaerella graminum
- Mycosphaerella grandis
- Mycosphaerella grandispora
- Mycosphaerella greenei
- Mycosphaerella gregaria
- Mycosphaerella grevilleae
- Mycosphaerella grisea
- Mycosphaerella groveana
- Mycosphaerella grumiformis
- Mycosphaerella guadarramica
- Mycosphaerella guettardina
- Mycosphaerella guineensis
- Mycosphaerella guttiferae
- Mycosphaerella gypsophila

== H ==
- Mycosphaerella halimodendri
- Mycosphaerella halophila
- Mycosphaerella hambergii
- Mycosphaerella handelii
- Mycosphaerella haraeana
- Mycosphaerella hariotiana
- Mycosphaerella harknessii
- Mycosphaerella harthensis
- Mycosphaerella hawaiiensis
- Mycosphaerella hederae-helicis
- Mycosphaerella hedericola
- Mycosphaerella hedychii
- Mycosphaerella heimii
- Mycosphaerella heimioides
- Mycosphaerella helenae
- Mycosphaerella hemerocallidis
- Mycosphaerella henningsii
- Mycosphaerella hepaticae
- Mycosphaerella hepaticarum
- Mycosphaerella heracleina
- Mycosphaerella hesperidum
- Mycosphaerella heucherae
- Mycosphaerella heveana
- Mycosphaerella heveicola
- Mycosphaerella hibisci
- Mycosphaerella hieracii
- Mycosphaerella hieraciophila
- Mycosphaerella hippocastani
- Mycosphaerella holci
- Mycosphaerella holmii
- Mycosphaerella holopteleae
- Mycosphaerella holualoana
- Mycosphaerella homalanthi
- Mycosphaerella honckenyae
- Mycosphaerella hondae
- Mycosphaerella hondai
- Mycosphaerella hordei
- Mycosphaerella hordicola
- Mycosphaerella horii
- Mycosphaerella hosackiae
- Mycosphaerella hostae
- Mycosphaerella hranicensis
- Mycosphaerella huteriana
- Mycosphaerella hydrocotyles-asiaticae
- Mycosphaerella hyperici
- Mycosphaerella hypericina
- Mycosphaerella hyphiseda
- Mycosphaerella hypochaeridis
- Mycosphaerella hypodermellae

== I ==
- Mycosphaerella idaeina
- Mycosphaerella idesiae
- Mycosphaerella ignobilis
- Mycosphaerella ikedai
- Mycosphaerella ilicella
- Mycosphaerella ilicicola
- Mycosphaerella ilicis
- Mycosphaerella ilicis-canariensis
- Mycosphaerella immersa
- Mycosphaerella impatientina
- Mycosphaerella impatientis
- Mycosphaerella imperatae
- Mycosphaerella implexae
- Mycosphaerella implexicola
- Mycosphaerella inaequalis
- Mycosphaerella incanescens
- Mycosphaerella incomperta
- Mycosphaerella inconspicua
- Mycosphaerella indica
- Mycosphaerella indistincta
- Mycosphaerella inflata
- Mycosphaerella infuscans
- Mycosphaerella insignita
- Mycosphaerella insulana
- Mycosphaerella intermedia
- Mycosphaerella ipiranguensis
- Mycosphaerella iridis
- Mycosphaerella irregulariramosa
- Mycosphaerella isariophora
- Mycosphaerella isatidis
- Mycosphaerella isoplexidis
- Mycosphaerella ixanthi
- Mycosphaerella ixodiae
- Mycosphaerella ixorae

== J ==
- Mycosphaerella jaapiana
- Mycosphaerella jaczewskii
- Mycosphaerella jaffueli
- Mycosphaerella janus
- Mycosphaerella japonica
- Mycosphaerella jasminicola
- Mycosphaerella jasmini-officinalis
- Mycosphaerella jenensis
- Mycosphaerella joerstadii
- Mycosphaerella jonkershoekensis
- Mycosphaerella juglandis
- Mycosphaerella juncaginearum
- Mycosphaerella juncellina
- Mycosphaerella juniperi
- Mycosphaerella juniperina
- Mycosphaerella jutlandica
- Mycosphaerella juvenis

== K ==
- Mycosphaerella kabocha
- Mycosphaerella kaduae
- Mycosphaerella kakomensis
- Mycosphaerella kandawanica
- Mycosphaerella kankeshwarensis
- Mycosphaerella karajacensis
- Mycosphaerella karakulinii
- Mycosphaerella keissleri
- Mycosphaerella keniensis
- Mycosphaerella kerguelensis
- Mycosphaerella khayae
- Mycosphaerella kirschsteinii
- Mycosphaerella koae
- Mycosphaerella kochiae
- Mycosphaerella koldingensis
- Mycosphaerella konae
- Mycosphaerella krigiae

== L ==
- Mycosphaerella lachesis
- Mycosphaerella lachmannii
- Mycosphaerella lactucae
- Mycosphaerella lageniformis
- Mycosphaerella lagunensis
- Mycosphaerella lapathi
- Mycosphaerella laricina
- Mycosphaerella laricis-leptolepidis
- Mycosphaerella larsenii
- Mycosphaerella latebrosa
- Mycosphaerella lateralis
- Mycosphaerella lathyri
- Mycosphaerella laureolae
- Mycosphaerella lebedevae
- Mycosphaerella leguminosarum
- Mycosphaerella lenticula
- Mycosphaerella lepidospermatis
- Mycosphaerella leptoasca
- Mycosphaerella leptopleura
- Mycosphaerella leptospora
- Mycosphaerella lethalis
- Mycosphaerella leucophaea
- Mycosphaerella leucospermi
- Mycosphaerella leucospila
- Mycosphaerella leucothoes
- Mycosphaerella liabi
- Mycosphaerella ligea
- Mycosphaerella lignicola
- Mycosphaerella ligustri
- Mycosphaerella limonis
- Mycosphaerella linariae
- Mycosphaerella lindaviana
- Mycosphaerella lindiana
- Mycosphaerella lineolata
- Mycosphaerella linhartiana
- Mycosphaerella lini
- Mycosphaerella linicola
- Mycosphaerella lini-perennis
- Mycosphaerella linnaeae
- Mycosphaerella lippiae
- Mycosphaerella liriodendri
- Mycosphaerella lithospermi
- Mycosphaerella lithraeae
- Mycosphaerella liukiuensis
- Mycosphaerella lobeliae
- Mycosphaerella loefgreni
- Mycosphaerella loliacea
- Mycosphaerella longibasalis
- Mycosphaerella longispora
- Mycosphaerella longissima
- Mycosphaerella loranthi
- Mycosphaerella louisianae
- Mycosphaerella ludwigiana
- Mycosphaerella ludwigii
- Mycosphaerella lumae
- Mycosphaerella lupini
- Mycosphaerella lupulina
- Mycosphaerella luzonensis
- Mycosphaerella luzonica
- Mycosphaerella lychnidicola
- Mycosphaerella lycii
- Mycosphaerella lycopodii
- Mycosphaerella lycopodii-annotini
- Mycosphaerella lycopodiicola
- Mycosphaerella lygei
- Mycosphaerella lysimachiicola
- Mycosphaerella lythracearum
- Mycosphaerella lythri

== M ==
- Mycosphaerella macedonica
- Mycosphaerella machaerii
- Mycosphaerella macleyae
- Mycosphaerella maclurae
- Mycosphaerella macrospora
- Mycosphaerella maculans
- Mycosphaerella maculicola
- Mycosphaerella madeirae
- Mycosphaerella maderensis
- Mycosphaerella maesae
- Mycosphaerella magellanica
- Mycosphaerella magellanicola
- Mycosphaerella magnoliae
- Mycosphaerella magnusiana
- Mycosphaerella major
- Mycosphaerella malinverniana
- Mycosphaerella malvina
- Mycosphaerella mandshurica
- Mycosphaerella manganottiana
- Mycosphaerella mangiferae
- Mycosphaerella manginii
- Mycosphaerella manihotis
- Mycosphaerella maniuana
- Mycosphaerella mappiae
- Mycosphaerella marasasii
- Mycosphaerella marksii
- Mycosphaerella martagonis
- Mycosphaerella martinae
- Mycosphaerella maturna
- Mycosphaerella mauica
- Mycosphaerella maxima
- Mycosphaerella maydina
- Mycosphaerella mazzantioides
- Mycosphaerella medicaginicola
- Mycosphaerella medicaginis
- Mycosphaerella mediterranea
- Mycosphaerella melaleucoides
- Mycosphaerella melanophora
- Mycosphaerella melanorhabdos
- Mycosphaerella melastomatacearum
- Mycosphaerella melconiana
- Mycosphaerella meliosmae
- Mycosphaerella melothriae
- Mycosphaerella merrillii
- Mycosphaerella metrosideri
- Mycosphaerella mexicana
- Mycosphaerella miconiae
- Mycosphaerella microscopia
- Mycosphaerella microsora
- Mycosphaerella midzurensis
- Mycosphaerella mikaniae
- Mycosphaerella mikaniae-micranthae
- Mycosphaerella millepunctata
- Mycosphaerella milleri
- Mycosphaerella mimosae-pigrae
- Mycosphaerella mimosicola
- Mycosphaerella minabensis
- Mycosphaerella minima
- Mycosphaerella minimipuncta
- Mycosphaerella minoensis
- Mycosphaerella minor
- Mycosphaerella minuartiae
- Mycosphaerella minutissima
- Mycosphaerella molluginis
- Mycosphaerella mombin
- Mycosphaerella monserratica
- Mycosphaerella montana
- Mycosphaerella montellica
- Mycosphaerella moquileae
- Mycosphaerella moravica
- Mycosphaerella mori
- Mycosphaerella mori-albae
- Mycosphaerella moricola
- Mycosphaerella morierei
- Mycosphaerella morindae
- Mycosphaerella morphaea
- Mycosphaerella morthieri
- Mycosphaerella mougeotiana
- Mycosphaerella moutan
- Mycosphaerella mucosa
- Mycosphaerella mucunae
- Mycosphaerella muehlenbergiae
- Mycosphaerella muelleriana
- Mycosphaerella mulgedii-alpini
- Mycosphaerella multiloculata
- Mycosphaerella multiseptata
- Mycosphaerella munkii
- Mycosphaerella munyangica
- Mycosphaerella murashkii
- Mycosphaerella murrayae
- Mycosphaerella musae
- Mycosphaerella muscari
- Mycosphaerella musicola
- Mycosphaerella mycoparasitica
- Mycosphaerella mycopron
- Mycosphaerella myricae
- Mycosphaerella myrticola
- Mycosphaerella myrtillina

== N ==
- Mycosphaerella najas
- Mycosphaerella nawae
- Mycosphaerella nectandrae
- Mycosphaerella nemesiae
- Mycosphaerella nemorosa
- Mycosphaerella nemoseridis
- Mycosphaerella nerii-odori
- Mycosphaerella nevodovskii
- Mycosphaerella nicotianae
- Mycosphaerella niesslii
- Mycosphaerella nigerristigma
- Mycosphaerella nigrificata
- Mycosphaerella nigrita
- Mycosphaerella nigromaculans
- Mycosphaerella nivalis
- Mycosphaerella nogalesii
- Mycosphaerella nothofagi
- Mycosphaerella nubilosa
- Mycosphaerella nuristanica
- Mycosphaerella nyssicola

== O ==
- Mycosphaerella oblivia
- Mycosphaerella occulta
- Mycosphaerella octopetalae
- Mycosphaerella oculata
- Mycosphaerella oedema
- Mycosphaerella oerteliana
- Mycosphaerella ohnowa
- Mycosphaerella oleandri
- Mycosphaerella oleina
- Mycosphaerella olindensis
- Mycosphaerella omphalosporoides
- Mycosphaerella onobrychidis
- Mycosphaerella ontariensis
- Mycosphaerella ootheca
- Mycosphaerella operculata
- Mycosphaerella opuntiae
- Mycosphaerella orbicularis
- Mycosphaerella orchidearum
- Mycosphaerella ornithogali
- Mycosphaerella orobi
- Mycosphaerella osborniae
- Mycosphaerella osmundicola
- Mycosphaerella oxalidis
- Mycosphaerella oxyacanthae
- Mycosphaerella oxycocci
- Mycosphaerella oxyriae

== P ==
- Mycosphaerella pachyasca
- Mycosphaerella pachysandrae
- Mycosphaerella pachystimae
- Mycosphaerella pachythecia
- Mycosphaerella padina
- Mycosphaerella paepalanthi
- Mycosphaerella paleicola
- Mycosphaerella pales
- Mycosphaerella palmae
- Mycosphaerella palmicola
- Mycosphaerella panacis
- Mycosphaerella panacis-ginseng
- Mycosphaerella pandani
- Mycosphaerella panicicola
- Mycosphaerella papuana
- Mycosphaerella papyrifera
- Mycosphaerella pardalota
- Mycosphaerella parjumanica
- Mycosphaerella parkii
- Mycosphaerella parnassiae
- Mycosphaerella paronychiae
- Mycosphaerella parva
- Mycosphaerella pascuorum
- Mycosphaerella pashkiensis
- Mycosphaerella passiflorae
- Mycosphaerella pataguae
- Mycosphaerella patoillardii
- Mycosphaerella patriniae
- Mycosphaerella paulowniae
- Mycosphaerella paulula
- Mycosphaerella pavonina
- Mycosphaerella peckii
- Mycosphaerella pectinis
- Mycosphaerella pedicularis
- Mycosphaerella pellucida
- Mycosphaerella pentastemonis
- Mycosphaerella perconferta
- Mycosphaerella peregrina
- Mycosphaerella perexigua
- Mycosphaerella pericampyli
- Mycosphaerella pericopsidis
- Mycosphaerella periplocae
- Mycosphaerella pernettyae
- Mycosphaerella perparva
- Mycosphaerella perpendicularis
- Mycosphaerella perseae
- Mycosphaerella persica
- Mycosphaerella persooniae
- Mycosphaerella peruviana
- Mycosphaerella petchii
- Mycosphaerella petrakii
- Mycosphaerella phacae-frigidae
- Mycosphaerella phaceliiphila
- Mycosphaerella phalaridis
- Mycosphaerella phaseoli
- Mycosphaerella phaseolorum
- Mycosphaerella pheidasca
- Mycosphaerella philochorta
- Mycosphaerella philodendri
- Mycosphaerella phlomidicola
- Mycosphaerella phlomidis
- Mycosphaerella phragmitis
- Mycosphaerella phyllachoroides
- Mycosphaerella phyllanthi
- Mycosphaerella phyllitis
- Mycosphaerella phyllostachydicola
- Mycosphaerella phyllostachydis
- Mycosphaerella physostegiae
- Mycosphaerella piliostigmatis
- Mycosphaerella pimpinellae
- Mycosphaerella pini
- Mycosphaerella pinicola
- Mycosphaerella pinifolia
- Mycosphaerella pini-patulae
- Mycosphaerella pinodes
- Mycosphaerella pinsapo
- Mycosphaerella piperis
- Mycosphaerella pirolae
- Mycosphaerella pirolina
- Mycosphaerella pistaciae
- Mycosphaerella pistaciarum
- Mycosphaerella pistacina
- Mycosphaerella pithecellobiicola
- Mycosphaerella pittieri
- Mycosphaerella pittospori
- Mycosphaerella plantaginicola
- Mycosphaerella plantaginis
- Mycosphaerella plantanifolia
- Mycosphaerella platani
- Mycosphaerella platanifolia
- Mycosphaerella platylobii
- Mycosphaerella platytheca
- Mycosphaerella plectranthi
- Mycosphaerella pluritubularis
- Mycosphaerella pneumatophorae
- Mycosphaerella podograriae
- Mycosphaerella podocarpicola
- Mycosphaerella podperae
- Mycosphaerella pogostemonis
- Mycosphaerella polemonii
- Mycosphaerella polia
- Mycosphaerella polifoliae
- Mycosphaerella polycarpa
- Mycosphaerella polygalina
- Mycosphaerella polygoni-cuspidati
- Mycosphaerella polygonorum
- Mycosphaerella polymorpha
- Mycosphaerella polyspora
- Mycosphaerella pomi
- Mycosphaerella pongamieae
- Mycosphaerella pontederiae
- Mycosphaerella poonensis
- Mycosphaerella populi
- Mycosphaerella populi-albae
- Mycosphaerella populicola
- Mycosphaerella populifolia
- Mycosphaerella populnea
- Mycosphaerella populorum
- Mycosphaerella poraqueibae
- Mycosphaerella potentillae
- Mycosphaerella potentillae-stipularis
- Mycosphaerella pourthiaeae
- Mycosphaerella pouzolziae
- Mycosphaerella praecox
- Mycosphaerella praeparva
- Mycosphaerella prasii
- Mycosphaerella prenanthis
- Mycosphaerella primulae
- Mycosphaerella prinsepiae
- Mycosphaerella proteae
- Mycosphaerella proteae-arboreae
- Mycosphaerella pruni-persicae
- Mycosphaerella psammae
- Mycosphaerella pseudacaciae
- Mycosphaerella pseudafricana
- Mycosphaerella pseudocryptica
- Mycosphaerella pseudoendophytica
- Mycosphaerella pseudomaculiformis
- Mycosphaerella pseudopsammae
- Mycosphaerella pseudoseptorioides
- Mycosphaerella pseudosphaerioides
- Mycosphaerella pseudosuberosa
- Mycosphaerella pseudovespa
- Mycosphaerella psilospora
- Mycosphaerella ptarmicae
- Mycosphaerella pteridicola
- Mycosphaerella pteridis
- Mycosphaerella pterocarpi
- Mycosphaerella pterophila
- Mycosphaerella puerariae
- Mycosphaerella pueraricola
- Mycosphaerella pulchella
- Mycosphaerella pulmonariae
- Mycosphaerella pulsatillae
- Mycosphaerella pulviscula
- Mycosphaerella punctata
- Mycosphaerella punctiformis
- Mycosphaerella pusilla
- Mycosphaerella putoriae
- Mycosphaerella puttemansii
- Mycosphaerella pyrenaica
- Mycosphaerella pyri
- Mycosphaerella pyrina

== Q ==
- Mycosphaerella quadrangulata
- Mycosphaerella quasicercospora
- Mycosphaerella queenslandica
- Mycosphaerella quercifolia

== R ==
- Mycosphaerella rabiei
- Mycosphaerella radiata
- Mycosphaerella ramulorum
- Mycosphaerella ranunculi
- Mycosphaerella rauwolfiae
- Mycosphaerella ravenelii
- Mycosphaerella readeriellophora
- Mycosphaerella recutita
- Mycosphaerella rehmiana
- Mycosphaerella resedicola
- Mycosphaerella reyesi
- Mycosphaerella rhaphithamni
- Mycosphaerella rhea
- Mycosphaerella rhododendri
- Mycosphaerella rhodophila
- Mycosphaerella rhodostacheos
- Mycosphaerella rhoina
- Mycosphaerella rhois
- Mycosphaerella rhynchosporae
- Mycosphaerella ribis
- Mycosphaerella ricciae
- Mycosphaerella richeae
- Mycosphaerella ricinicola
- Mycosphaerella robiniae
- Mycosphaerella rosae
- Mycosphaerella rosicola
- Mycosphaerella rosigena
- Mycosphaerella rottboelliae
- Mycosphaerella roureae
- Mycosphaerella rubefaciens
- Mycosphaerella rubella
- Mycosphaerella rubi
- Mycosphaerella rubiae
- Mycosphaerella rubicola
- Mycosphaerella rusci
- Mycosphaerella ruscicola
- Mycosphaerella ruthenica

== S ==
- Mycosphaerella sabalis
- Mycosphaerella saccardoana
- Mycosphaerella sacchari
- Mycosphaerella saccharoides
- Mycosphaerella sagedioides
- Mycosphaerella saginae
- Mycosphaerella sagittariae
- Mycosphaerella sajanyca
- Mycosphaerella salciorniae
- Mycosphaerella salicicola
- Mycosphaerella salicina
- Mycosphaerella salicis
- Mycosphaerella salicorniae
- Mycosphaerella salvatorensis
- Mycosphaerella salviae
- Mycosphaerella samaneae
- Mycosphaerella sanguisorbae
- Mycosphaerella sapindicola
- Mycosphaerella sarothamni
- Mycosphaerella sarraceniae
- Mycosphaerella sarracenica
- Mycosphaerella sassafras
- Mycosphaerella saussureae-alpinae
- Mycosphaerella sawadae
- Mycosphaerella saxatilis
- Mycosphaerella saxifragae
- Mycosphaerella scabiosae
- Mycosphaerella scaevolae
- Mycosphaerella schelkovnikovii
- Mycosphaerella schizandrae
- Mycosphaerella schoenocauli
- Mycosphaerella scirpi-lacustris
- Mycosphaerella scirrhoides
- Mycosphaerella scopulorum
- Mycosphaerella scorzonerae
- Mycosphaerella scrophulariae
- Mycosphaerella scytalidii
- Mycosphaerella secundaria
- Mycosphaerella securinegae
- Mycosphaerella sedicola
- Mycosphaerella selene
- Mycosphaerella semeles
- Mycosphaerella senecionis
- Mycosphaerella septorioides
- Mycosphaerella septoriospora
- Mycosphaerella septorispora
- Mycosphaerella sequoiae
- Mycosphaerella serpylli
- Mycosphaerella serrulatae
- Mycosphaerella sesami
- Mycosphaerella sesamicola
- Mycosphaerella seseli
- Mycosphaerella setosa
- Mycosphaerella shawii
- Mycosphaerella shibataeae
- Mycosphaerella shikaeana
- Mycosphaerella shimadae
- Mycosphaerella shiraiana
- Mycosphaerella shoreae
- Mycosphaerella sicula
- Mycosphaerella sicyicola
- Mycosphaerella sidicola
- Mycosphaerella sieberiana
- Mycosphaerella silenes-acaulis
- Mycosphaerella silenicola
- Mycosphaerella silenis
- Mycosphaerella silvatica
- Mycosphaerella silveirae
- Mycosphaerella singularis
- Mycosphaerella sisyrinchiicola
- Mycosphaerella skimmiae
- Mycosphaerella slaptoniensis
- Mycosphaerella smilacicola
- Mycosphaerella smilacifolii
- Mycosphaerella smilacina
- Mycosphaerella smilacis-glabrae
- Mycosphaerella sodiroana
- Mycosphaerella sophorae
- Mycosphaerella sordidula
- Mycosphaerella spartinae
- Mycosphaerella spegazzinii
- Mycosphaerella spetsbergensis
- Mycosphaerella sphaerelloides
- Mycosphaerella sphaerellula
- Mycosphaerella sphaerosperma
- Mycosphaerella sphaerulinae
- Mycosphaerella spilota
- Mycosphaerella spinicola
- Mycosphaerella spiraeae
- Mycosphaerella spissa
- Mycosphaerella spleniata
- Mycosphaerella spraguei
- Mycosphaerella staphyleae
- Mycosphaerella staphylina
- Mycosphaerella staticicola
- Mycosphaerella stellarinearum
- Mycosphaerella stemmatea
- Mycosphaerella stephaniae
- Mycosphaerella stephaniicola
- Mycosphaerella stephanorossiae
- Mycosphaerella stevensii
- Mycosphaerella stigmina-platani
- Mycosphaerella stigmophylli
- Mycosphaerella stipicola
- Mycosphaerella stipina
- Mycosphaerella stramenti
- Mycosphaerella stramenticola
- Mycosphaerella striatiformans
- Mycosphaerella stromatica
- Mycosphaerella stromatoidea
- Mycosphaerella stromatosa
- Mycosphaerella strychnotis
- Mycosphaerella styracis
- Mycosphaerella suaedae-australis
- Mycosphaerella subantarctica
- Mycosphaerella subastoma
- Mycosphaerella subcongregata
- Mycosphaerella uberosa
- Mycosphaerella subgregaria
- Mycosphaerella sublibera
- Mycosphaerella subostiolica
- Mycosphaerella subsequens
- Mycosphaerella succedanea
- Mycosphaerella sumacis
- Mycosphaerella sumatrensis
- Mycosphaerella superflua
- Mycosphaerella suttonii
- Mycosphaerella swartii
- Mycosphaerella sydowii
- Mycosphaerella symphyostemonis
- Mycosphaerella syncarpiae
- Mycosphaerella syringae
- Mycosphaerella syringicola
- Mycosphaerella syzygii

== T ==
- Mycosphaerella tabaci
- Mycosphaerella tabebuiae
- Mycosphaerella tabifica
- Mycosphaerella tabularis
- Mycosphaerella taediosa
- Mycosphaerella taeniographa
- Mycosphaerella taeniographoides
- Mycosphaerella tahitensis
- Mycosphaerella tajmyrensis
- Mycosphaerella tamaricis
- Mycosphaerella tamarindi
- Mycosphaerella taraxaci
- Mycosphaerella tardiva
- Mycosphaerella tasmaniensis
- Mycosphaerella tassiana
- Mycosphaerella tatarica
- Mycosphaerella tecomae
- Mycosphaerella telopeae
- Mycosphaerella ternstroemiae
- Mycosphaerella tetraspora
- Mycosphaerella tetroncii
- Mycosphaerella teucrii
- Mycosphaerella thailandica
- Mycosphaerella thais
- Mycosphaerella thalictri
- Mycosphaerella thalictrina
- Mycosphaerella thaspiicola
- Mycosphaerella theae
- Mycosphaerella theissenii
- Mycosphaerella thelypteridis
- Mycosphaerella theobromae
- Mycosphaerella theodulina
- Mycosphaerella thermopsidis
- Mycosphaerella thesii
- Mycosphaerella thironi
- Mycosphaerella thujae
- Mycosphaerella thujopsidis
- Mycosphaerella thysselini
- Mycosphaerella tilakii
- Mycosphaerella tiliae
- Mycosphaerella tingens
- Mycosphaerella tinosporae
- Mycosphaerella tirolensis
- Mycosphaerella tithymali
- Mycosphaerella tocoyenae
- Mycosphaerella togashiana
- Mycosphaerella togniniana
- Mycosphaerella toledana
- Mycosphaerella tomilinii
- Mycosphaerella topographica
- Mycosphaerella tormentillae
- Mycosphaerella tournefortiae
- Mycosphaerella tragopogonicola
- Mycosphaerella tremulicola
- Mycosphaerella trichomanis
- Mycosphaerella trifolii
- Mycosphaerella triseti
- Mycosphaerella tristaniae
- Mycosphaerella trochicarpi
- Mycosphaerella tsugae
- Mycosphaerella tuerckheimii
- Mycosphaerella tulipifera
- Mycosphaerella tumulosa
- Mycosphaerella tunguahuana
- Mycosphaerella tupae
- Mycosphaerella tussilaginis
- Mycosphaerella typhae
- Mycosphaerella typhina

== U ==
- Mycosphaerella ulmariae
- Mycosphaerella ulmi
- Mycosphaerella ulmifolia
- Mycosphaerella unedinis
- Mycosphaerella urticae-dioicae
- Mycosphaerella ushuwaiensis
- Mycosphaerella uspenskajae
- Mycosphaerella usteriana

== V ==
- Mycosphaerella vaccinii
- Mycosphaerella vacciniicola
- Mycosphaerella vagans
- Mycosphaerella valeppensis
- Mycosphaerella valida
- Mycosphaerella variabilis
- Mycosphaerella venezuelensis
- Mycosphaerella veratri
- Mycosphaerella veratri-lobeliani
- Mycosphaerella verbascicola
- Mycosphaerella verbenae
- Mycosphaerella verecunda
- Mycosphaerella vernoniae
- Mycosphaerella verrucosiafricana
- Mycosphaerella vesicaria
- Mycosphaerella vesicaria-arcticae
- Mycosphaerella vespa
- Mycosphaerella vexans
- Mycosphaerella viburni
- Mycosphaerella viciae
- Mycosphaerella viciarum
- Mycosphaerella viegasii
- Mycosphaerella vindobonensis
- Mycosphaerella violae
- Mycosphaerella vitalbina
- Mycosphaerella vitensis
- Mycosphaerella viticis
- Mycosphaerella viticola
- Mycosphaerella vitis
- Mycosphaerella vitis-viniferae
- Mycosphaerella vivipari
- Mycosphaerella vogelii
- Mycosphaerella vogesiaca
- Mycosphaerella volkartii
- Mycosphaerella vulnerariae

== W ==
- Mycosphaerella wagnerae
- Mycosphaerella waimeana
- Mycosphaerella wakkeri
- Mycosphaerella walkeri
- Mycosphaerella washingtoniae
- Mycosphaerella websteri
- Mycosphaerella weigeliae
- Mycosphaerella welwitschii
- Mycosphaerella wichuriana
- Mycosphaerella winteri
- Mycosphaerella winteriana
- Mycosphaerella wisteriae
- Mycosphaerella wladiwostokensis
- Mycosphaerella wollemiae
- Mycosphaerella woronichinii
- Mycosphaerella woronowii

== X ==
- Mycosphaerella xanthiicola
- Mycosphaerella xerophylli
- Mycosphaerella xylomeli

== Y ==
- Mycosphaerella yaku-insularia
- Mycosphaerella yanagawaensis
- Mycosphaerella yuccae
- Mycosphaerella yuccina

== Z ==
- Mycosphaerella zeae
- Mycosphaerella zeae-maydis
- Mycosphaerella zeicola
- Mycosphaerella zeina
- Mycosphaerella zelkowae
- Mycosphaerella zeylanica
- Mycosphaerella zilingii
- Mycosphaerella zingiberis
- Mycosphaerella zizaniae
- Mycosphaerella zizaniicola
- Mycosphaerella zizyphicola
