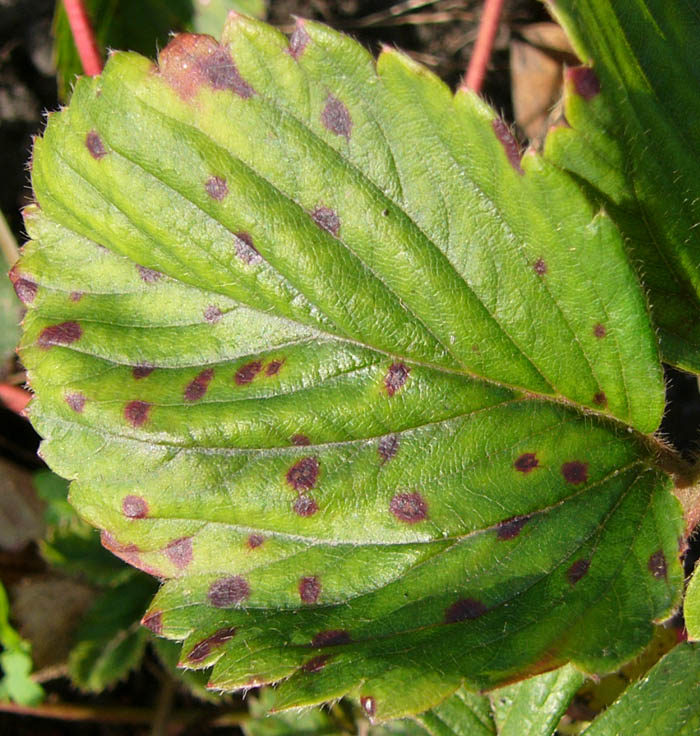
- Mycosphaerella fragariae

Scientific classification
- Domain: Eukaryota
- Kingdom: Fungi
- Division: Ascomycota
- Class: Dothideomycetes
- Order: Capnodiales
- Family: Mycosphaerellaceae
- Genus: Mycosphaerella; Johanson, 1884

Type species
- Mycosphaerella punctiformis (Pers.) Starbäck, 1889

Species
- Selected species: Mycosphaerella angulata; Mycosphaerella arachidis; Mycosphaerella areola; Mycosphaerella berkeleyi; Mycosphaerella bolleana; Mycosphaerella brassicicola; Mycosphaerella caricae; Mycosphaerella carinthiaca; Mycosphaerella caryigena; Mycosphaerella cerasella; Mycosphaerella citri; Mycosphaerella coffeicola; Mycosphaerella confusa; Mycosphaerella cruenta; Mycosphaerella dendroides; Mycosphaerella dianthi; Mycosphaerella eumusae; Mycosphaerella fijiensis; Mycosphaerella fragariae; Mycosphaerella gossypina; Mycosphaerella graminicola; Mycosphaerella henningsii; Mycosphaerella horii; Mycosphaerella juglandis; Mycosphaerella lageniformis; Mycosphaerella linicola; Mycosphaerella louisianae; Mycosphaerella musae; Mycosphaerella musicola; Mycosphaerella palmicola; Mycosphaerella pinodes; Mycosphaerella pistaciarum; Mycosphaerella pistacina; Mycosphaerella platanifolia; Mycosphaerella polymorpha; Mycosphaerella pomi; Mycosphaerella punctiformis; Mycosphaerella pyri; Mycosphaerella rabiei; Mycosphaerella recutita; Mycosphaerella rosicola; Mycosphaerella rubi; Mycosphaerella stigmina-platani; Mycosphaerella striatiformans; Mycosphaerella tassiana; See List of Mycosphaerella species.

= Mycosphaerella =

Genus of fungi

Mycosphaerella is a genus of ascomycota. With more than 10,000 species, it is the largest genus of plant pathogen fungi.

The following introduction about the fungal genus Mycosphaerella is copied (with permission) from the dissertation of W. Quaedvlieg (named: Re-evaluating Mycosphaerella and allied genera).

Species belonging to the fungal genus Mycosphaerella (1884) (Capnodiales, Dothideomycetes) have evolved as endophytes, saprotrophs and symbionts, but mostly Mycosphaerella species are foliicolous plant pathogens which are the cause of significant economical losses in both temperate and tropical crops worldwide. The generic concept of Mycosphaerella is based on the type species of the genus, M. punctiformis, which was introduced 130 years ago in order to describe small loculoascomycetes with few distinct morphological traits. Species belonging to Mycosphaerella were characterised as having pseudothecial ascomata that can be immersed or superficial, embedded in host tissue or erumpent, having ostiolar periphyses, but lacking interascal tissue at maturity. Ascospores are hyaline, but in some cases slightly pigmented and predominantly 1-septate, although taxa with 3-septate ascospores have been recorded. This description appears to be quite distinctive, but is in fact very broad and actually lead to 120 years of confusion in which the generic name Mycosphaerella was being used as a dumping ground for small loculoascomycetes with few distinct morphological traits. In the 19th and 20th centuries, thousands of species and infrasprecific taxa were described in the genus Sphaerella, only to have the entire genus and about 1000 additional species redescribed into the genus Mycosphaerella at the end of the 20th century.

The identification of Mycosphaerella species by morphological means is extremely difficult as these taxa produce very small fruiting structures with highly conserved morphologies, tending to grow and sporulate poorly in culture and for over 120 years, identification was based on morphology alone. These identification difficulties are amplified by the fact that up to six different species can inhabit the same lesion as either a primary or secondary pathogen, making even host-specific species difficult to identify. The introduction of affordable sequencing technology during the first decade of the 21st century allowed for much more accurate species delimitation and phylogenetic elucidation, leading to the conclusion that the broad taxonomic description of the genus Mycosphaerella and a lack of clear morphological features led to many Mycosphaerella and mycosphaerella-like species being misidentified. Because the classic taxonomic description of Mycosphaerella is broad and includes so many mycosphaerella-like species, the traditional generic concept of Mycosphaerella will hereafter be referred to as Mycosphaerella sensu lato (s. lat.) in order to avoid confusion.

Currently more than 3 000 species and close to 10 000 names are associated with Mycosphaerella s. lat., but work by Verkley et al. (2004) revealed that the genus Mycosphaerella s. str. (based on M. punctiformis) was in fact limited to species with Ramularia asexual morphs. Research by Braun (1990, 1998) showed that there are only about 500 Ramularia species known from literature, leaving the majority of mycosphaerella-like species that will need to be reclassified into taxonomically correct genera and families. Since the advent of mass sequencing technology, 39 taxonomically correct genera have already been confirmed as belonging to the Mycosphaerellaceae via molecular means:

(Amycosphaerella, Neopseudocercospora, Ramularia, Caryophylloseptoria, Neoseptoria, Ramulispora, Cercospora, Pallidocercospora, Ruptoseptoria, Cercosporella, Paracercospora, Scolecostigmina, Colletogloeum, Paramycosphaerella, Septoria, Cytostagonospora, Passalora*, Sonderhenia, Distocercospora, Periconiella, Sphaerulina, Dothistroma, Phaeophleospora, Stenella, Lecanosticta, Phloeospora, Stromatoseptoria, Microcyclosporella, Polyphialoseptoria, Trochophora, Neodeightoniella, Polythrincium, Xenomycosphaerella, Neomycosphaerella, Pseudocercospora, Zasmidium, Neopenidiella, Pseudocercosporella* and Zymoseptoria)

- The genera Passalora and Pseudocercosporella are known to be paraphyletic and will be treated separately in the near future.

Although at least 25 more genera with postulated Mycosphaerellaceae affinity have yet to be confirmed. The current generic and family concepts of both Mycosphaerella s. str., the Mycosphaerellaceae and the Teratosphaeriaceae have evolved indirectly from the work of Crous (1998), who used culture and asexual morphological characteristics to show that Mycosphaerella s. lat. was in fact polyphyletic, suggesting that it should be subdivided into natural genera as defined by its asexual morphs. In contrast to these findings, the first sequence-based phylogenetic trees published for Mycosphaerella s. lat. (based mainly on ITS nrDNA sequence data), suggested that Mycosphaerella was monophyletic. However, as more sequence data of Mycosphaerella spp. became available (especially of loci such as the 28S nrDNA), the view of Mycosphaerella s. lat. as being monophyletic has gradually shifted and there is now ample evidence that Mycosphaerella in its broadest sense is polyphyletic. Since this discovery was made, the original conserved generic concept of Mycosphaerella s. lat. has been replaced with the concept that the mycosphaerella-like morphology has evolved multiple times and that these taxa in fact cluster in diverse families such as the Cladosporiaceae, Dissoconiaceae, Mycosphaerellaceae and Teratosphaeriaceae.

As such, the name Mycosphaerella should be limited to species with Ramularia sexual forms, but the name Ramularia actually predates the name Mycosphaerella, so the name Ramularia has preference over Mycosphaerella, and will be placed on the list of protected names.

== Mating type ==
Three closely related Mycosphaerella species, M. fijiensis, M. musicola and M. eumusae cause a destructive disease of bananas. Each of these three species is heterothallic, that is, matings can only occur between individuals of different mating type. Although the mating type DNA sequences of the three species appear to have arisen from a common ancestral sequence, there also has been considerable evolutionary divergence between them.
