= Mycosphaerella horii =

Scientific classification
- Kingdom: Fungi
- Division: Ascomycota
- Class: Dothideomycetes
- Order: Capnodiales
- Family: Mycosphaerellaceae
- Genus: Mycosphaerella
- Species: M. horii

Binomial name
- Mycosphaerella horii Hara

Species of fungus

Mycosphaerella horii is a fungal plant pathogen, it was reported to be the cause of citrus greasy spot in japan in 1956. Greasy spot in citrus is also known to be caused by Mycosphaerella citri.

== See also ==
- List of Mycosphaerella species
- List of citrus diseases
