= M. dianthi =

M. dianthi may refer to:

- Macrophoma dianthi, an anamorphic fungus
- Mycosphaerella dianthi, a plant pathogen
