= D. dianthi =

D. dianthi may refer to:

- Davidiella dianthi, a plant pathogen
- Dinemasporium dianthi, a plant pathogen
- Diplodia dianthi, an anamorphic fungus
