= Mycosphaerella caricae =

Scientific classification
- Kingdom: Fungi
- Division: Ascomycota
- Class: Dothideomycetes
- Order: Mycosphaerellales
- Family: Mycosphaerellaceae
- Genus: Mycosphaerella
- Species: M. caricae

Binomial name
- Mycosphaerella caricae Syd. & P. Syd. (1913)

Species of fungus

Mycosphaerella caricae is a fungal plant pathogen.

== See also ==
- List of Mycosphaerella species
