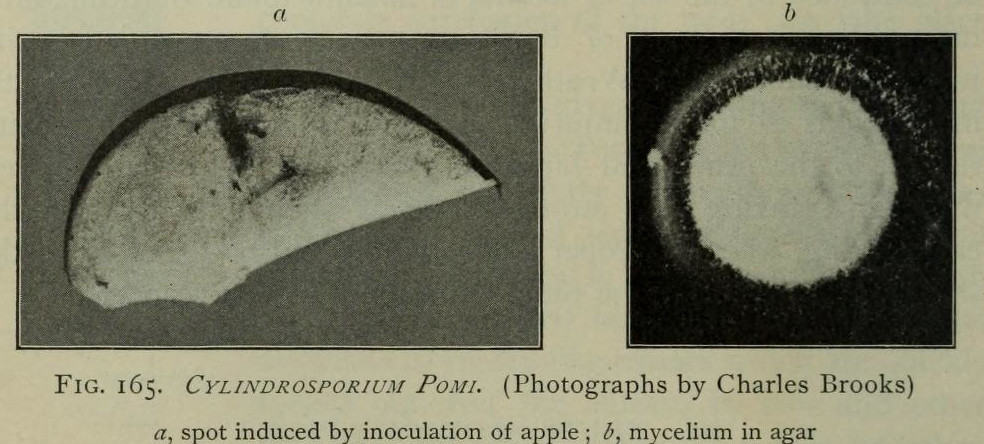
- Mycosphaerella pomi a) spot induced by inoculation of apple, b) mycelium in agar

Scientific classification
- Kingdom: Fungi
- Division: Ascomycota
- Class: Dothideomycetes
- Order: Capnodiales
- Family: Mycosphaerellaceae
- Genus: Mycosphaerella
- Species: M. pomi

Binomial name
- Mycosphaerella pomi (Pass.) Lindau, (1897)

Synonyms
- Aposphaeria pomi (Schulzer & Sacc.) Sacc. Cylindrosporium pomi C. Brooks; Phoma limitata (Peck) Boerema, (1965); Phoma pomi Schulzer & Sacc. Phyllosticta limitata Peck, (1897); Phyllosticta mali Prill. & Delacr., (1890); Pseudocercosporella pomi (C. Brooks) Noordel. & Boerema, (1988); Sphaerella pomi Pass., (1878)

= Mycosphaerella pomi =

Species of fungus

Mycosphaerella pomi is a fungus in the Mycosphaerellaceae family.

It was first described by Giovanni Passerini in 1878 as Sphaerella pomi, and transferred to the genus, Mycosphaerella, in 1897 by Gustav Lindau. The species epithet, pomi, is the genitive of Latin, pomum ("apple") and refers to the fact that this is a fungus found on apples.

== See also ==
- List of Mycosphaerella species
