= Mycosphaerella henningsii =

Scientific classification
- Kingdom: Fungi
- Division: Ascomycota
- Class: Dothideomycetes
- Order: Mycosphaerellales
- Family: Mycosphaerellaceae
- Genus: Mycosphaerella
- Species: M. henningsii

Binomial name
- Mycosphaerella henningsii Sivan., (1985)

Synonyms
- Cercospora henningsii Allesch., (1895); Cercosporidium henningsii (Allesch.) Deighton, (1976); Mycosphaerella manihotis Ghesq. & Henrard, (1924); Passalora henningsii (Allesch.) R.F. Castañeda & U. Braun, (1989)

Species of fungus

Mycosphaerella henningsii is a fungal plant pathogen that causes Brown leaf spot (BLS) in cassava.

It is one of the worst fungal diseases of cassava. BLS disease appears as small brown spots with dark borders on the upper leaf surface. The brown spots form between leaf veins so their size and shape are limited by the veins. The centre of the brown spots may fall out leaving a hole in the leaf. During a bad attack the infected leaves become yellow and dry, and may die early. The disease can greatly reduce yields.

The fungus lives in diseased cassava leaves on the plant or those on the ground. It spreads to new leaves and plants by wind or rain splash.

== Management ==
Partners of the CABI-led programme, Plantwise, including MAAIF recommend good planting stock and hygiene to reduce BLS. They suggest crop husks infected with BLS should be destroyed to reduce the disease spreading to the next planting.

Karyeija Robert from MAAIF also recommends early planting allows the crop to grow more vigorously. This will help to reduce the damage that the disease causes to the plant.

Plantwise partners from the Ministry of Agriculture (MoA) in Zambia and the Zambia Agriculture Research Institute (ZARI) recommend removing dead leaves and diseased leaves on plants and burn them to prevent the spread of fungal spores. They also recommend using clean tools and protective gear to avoid spreading spores.

It is also recommended by the MoA in Zambia and ZARI to plant crops spaced out (1m x 1m) to allow airflow. Pruning overgrown cassava plants will also improve aeration and reduce disease development. They also recommend rotating cassava with unrelated crops (e.g. maize) to break the cycle of disease.

== Sources ==
This article incorporates text from a free content work. Licensed under CC-BY-SA (license statement/permission). Text taken from Plantwise Factsheets for Farmers: Brown Leaf Spot (BLS) of Cassava, Karyeija Robert, CABI.

This article incorporates text from a free content work. Licensed under CC-BY-SA (license statement/permission). Text taken from PMDG: Cercospora brown spot on cassava, Aggrey Chipuluka (MoA), Mtawa Mkulama (ZARI), Robert Kelly Salati (ZARI), CABI.

== See also ==
- List of Mycosphaerella species
