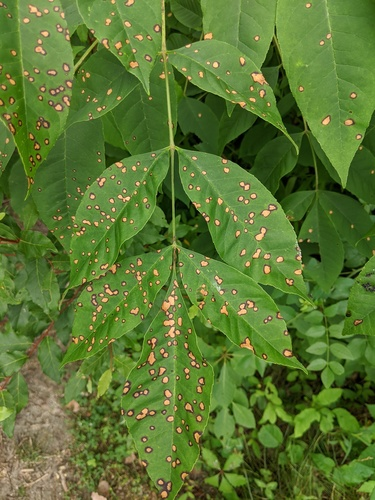
- Spots

Scientific classification
- Kingdom: Fungi
- Division: Ascomycota
- Class: Dothideomycetes
- Order: Mycosphaerellales
- Family: Mycosphaerellaceae
- Genus: Mycosphaerella
- Species: M. fraxinicola

Binomial name
- Mycosphaerella fraxinicola (Schwein.) House

= Mycosphaerella fraxinicola =

Species of fungi

Mycosphaerella fraxinicola is a species of fungi that causes leaf spots on ash trees. It appears in late summertime.

== Description ==
Initially, the leaf spots start out as irregularly shaped and pale green before rotting to black. Spots measure between 5 and 15 mm (0.2 and 0.6 in).
