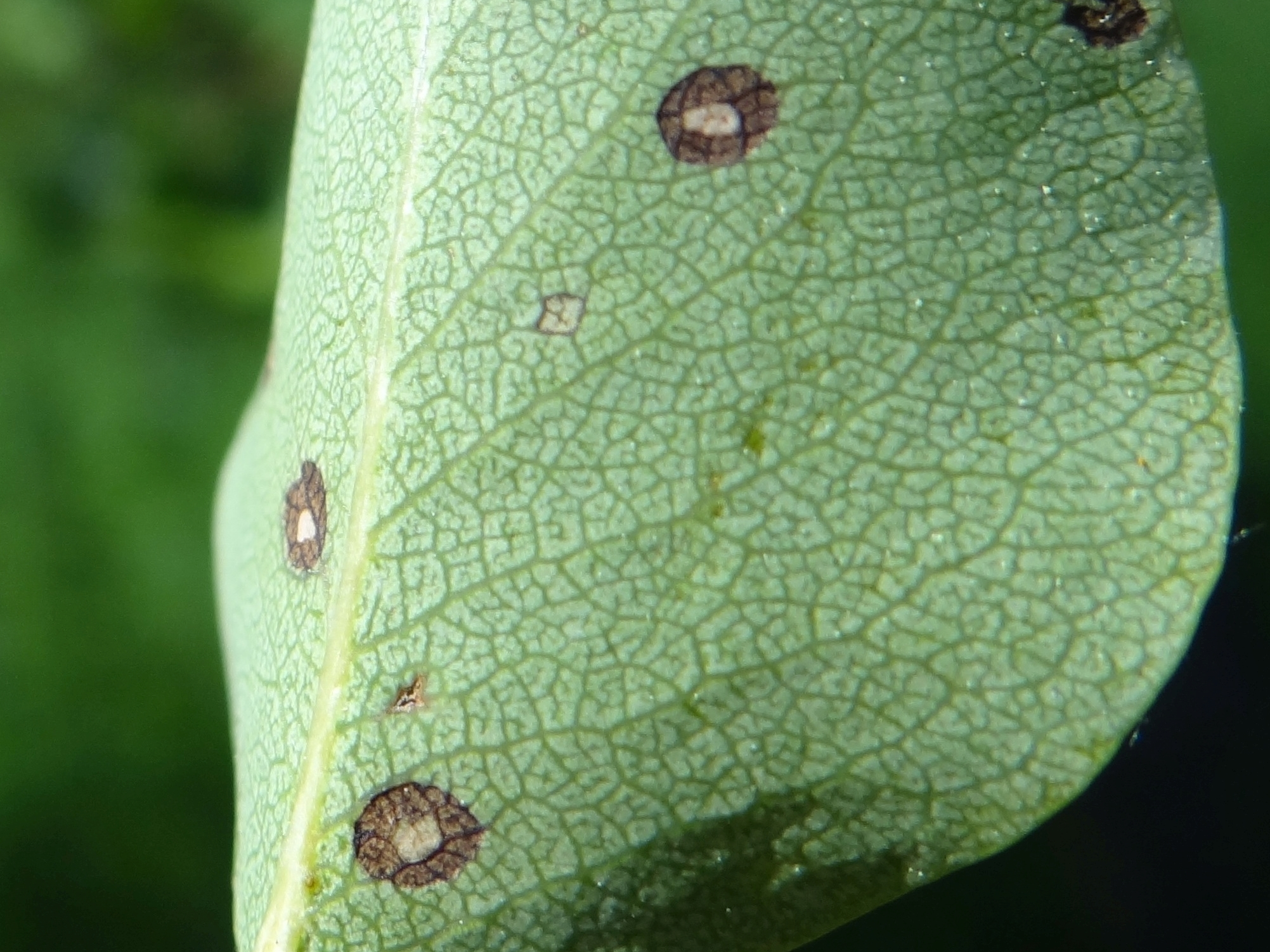
- Mycosphaerella pyri found on underside of leaf of Pyrus communis in Trzciana, Lesser Poland Voivodeship, Poland

Scientific classification
- Domain: Eukaryota
- Kingdom: Fungi
- Division: Ascomycota
- Class: Dothideomycetes
- Order: Capnodiales
- Family: Mycosphaerellaceae
- Genus: Mycosphaerella
- Species: M. pyri

Binomial name
- Mycosphaerella pyri (Auersw.) Boerema, (1970)

Synonyms
- Mycosphaerella sentina (Fr.) J. Schröt., (1894); Phaeosphaerella sentina (Fr.) Verpl., (1939); Septoria nigerrima Fuckel, (1870); Septoria pyricola Desm. Sphaerella pyri Auersw., (1869); Sphaerella sentina Fuckel; Sphaerella sentina (Fr.) Sacc., (1882); Sphaeria sentina Fr., (1823)

= Mycosphaerella pyri =

Species of fungus

Mycosphaerella pyri is a fungal plant pathogen.

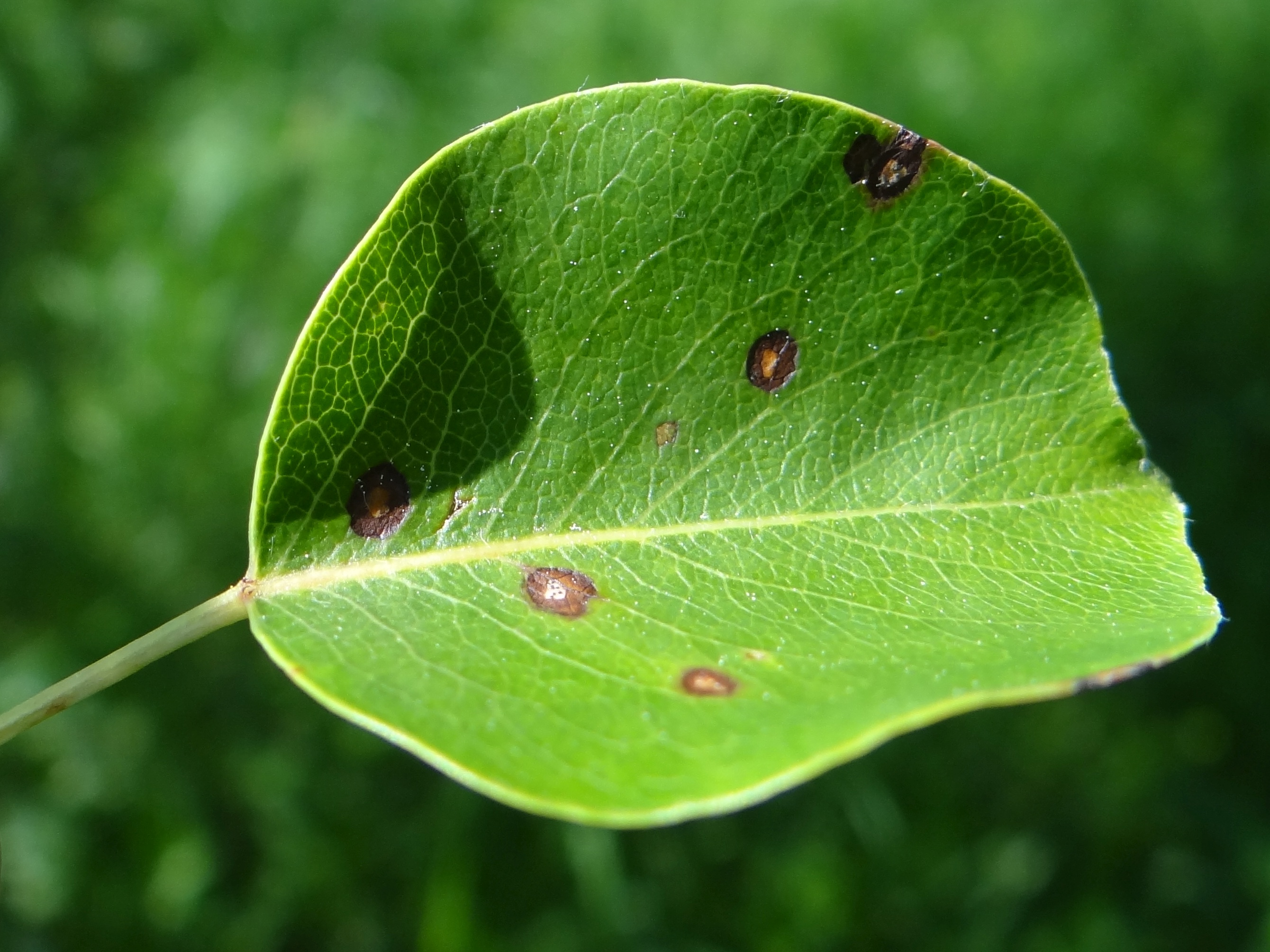
view from topside of leaf

== See also ==
- List of Mycosphaerella species
