= Mycosphaerella arachidis =

Scientific classification
- Kingdom: Fungi
- Division: Ascomycota
- Class: Dothideomycetes
- Order: Capnodiales
- Family: Mycosphaerellaceae
- Genus: Mycosphaerella
- Species: M. arachidis

Binomial name
- Mycosphaerella arachidis Deighton (1967)

Synonyms
- Mycosphaerella arachidicola W.A. Jenkins, (1938); Mycosphaerella jenkinsii Tomilin, (1968)

Species of fungus

Mycosphaerella arachidis is a fungal plant pathogen.

== See also ==
- List of Mycosphaerella species
