= Mycosphaerella linicola =

Scientific classification
- Kingdom: Fungi
- Division: Ascomycota
- Class: Dothideomycetes
- Order: Mycosphaerellales
- Family: Mycosphaerellaceae
- Genus: Mycosphaerella
- Species: M. linicola

Binomial name
- Mycosphaerella linicola Naumov, (1926)

Synonyms
- Mycosphaerella linorum (Wollenw.) García-Rada,: 14 (1942); Phlyctema linicola Speg., (1910); Septogloeum linicola Speg. Septoria linicola (Speg.) Garass., (1938); Sphaerella linicola (Naumov) Wollenw., (1938); Sphaerella linorum Wollenw., (1938)

Species of fungus

Mycosphaerella linicola is a fungal plant pathogen. It affects flax and linseed crops, and has been found in Europe and North and South America.

== See also ==
- List of Mycosphaerella species
