= Mycosphaerella juglandis =

Scientific classification
- Kingdom: Fungi
- Division: Ascomycota
- Class: Dothideomycetes
- Order: Mycosphaerellales
- Family: Mycosphaerellaceae
- Genus: Mycosphaerella
- Species: M. juglandis

Binomial name
- Mycosphaerella juglandis K.J. Kessler (1984)

Species of fungus

Mycosphaerella juglandis is a fungal plant pathogen that affects Juglans nigra.

== See also ==
- List of Mycosphaerella species
