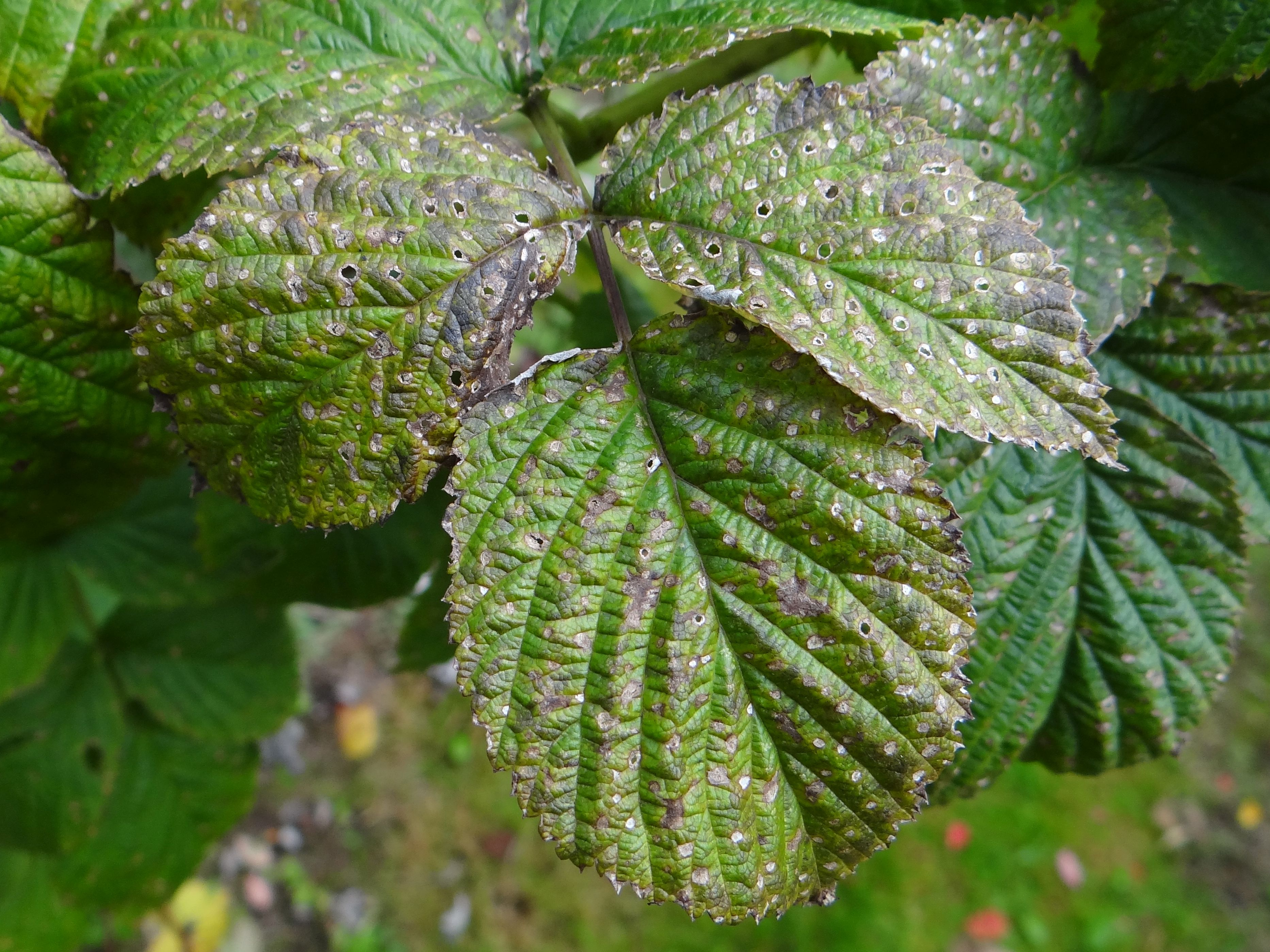
- Mycosphaerella rubi on Rubus sp.

Scientific classification
- Domain: Eukaryota
- Kingdom: Fungi
- Division: Ascomycota
- Class: Dothideomycetes
- Order: Capnodiales
- Family: Mycosphaerellaceae
- Genus: Mycosphaerella
- Species: M. rubi

Binomial name
- Mycosphaerella rubi Roark, (1921)

= Mycosphaerella rubi =

Species of fungus

Mycosphaerella rubi is a fungal plant pathogen.

== See also ==
- List of Mycosphaerella species
