= Mycosphaerella louisianae =

Scientific classification
- Kingdom: Fungi
- Division: Ascomycota
- Class: Dothideomycetes
- Order: Capnodiales
- Family: Mycosphaerellaceae
- Genus: Mycosphaerella
- Species: M. louisianae

Binomial name
- Mycosphaerella louisianae Plakidas (1941)

Species of fungus

Mycosphaerella louisianae is a fungal plant pathogen. It produces diseases such as purple leaf spot on strawberry plants.

== See also ==
- List of Mycosphaerella species
