= Mycosphaerella caryigena =

Scientific classification
- Kingdom: Fungi
- Division: Ascomycota
- Class: Dothideomycetes
- Order: Mycosphaerellales
- Family: Mycosphaerellaceae
- Genus: Mycosphaerella
- Species: M. caryigena

Binomial name
- Mycosphaerella caryigena Demaree & Cole, (1932)

Synonyms
- Cercoseptoria caryigena (Ellis & Everh.) Davis, (1937); Cercosporella caryigena (Ellis & Everh.) Höhn., (1924); Cylindrosporium caryigenum Ellis & Everh. Pseudocercosporella caryigena (Ellis & Everh.) Sivan., (1984)

Species of fungus

Mycosphaerella caryigena is a fungal plant pathogen that causes scab disease in pecan trees.

== See also ==
- List of Mycosphaerella species
