= Mycosphaerella platanifolia =

Scientific classification
- Kingdom: Fungi
- Division: Ascomycota
- Class: Dothideomycetes
- Order: Mycosphaerellales
- Family: Mycosphaerellaceae
- Genus: Mycosphaerella
- Species: M. platanifolia

Binomial name
- Mycosphaerella platanifolia (Cooke) F.A. Wolf

Synonyms
- Sphaerella platanifolia Cooke

Species of fungus

Mycosphaerella platanifolia is a fungal plant pathogen. During early spring, Mycosphaerella spores are produced in the fruiting bodies of infected leaves. It appears as uneven, round tan spots with red and brown haloes that are approximately 0.1 to 1cm large. Infections of Mycosphaerella are of minor consequence to a tree's health, but may be treated with organic pesticides in the case of a severe outbreak.

== See also ==
- List of Mycosphaerella species
