= Mycosphaerella cerasella =

Scientific classification
- Kingdom: Fungi
- Division: Ascomycota
- Class: Dothideomycetes
- Order: Mycosphaerellales
- Family: Mycosphaerellaceae
- Genus: Mycosphaerella
- Species: M. cerasella

Binomial name
- Mycosphaerella cerasella Aderh., (1900)

Synonyms
- Cercospora cerasella Sacc., Michelia 1(no. 2): 266 (1878); Cercospora circumscissa Sacc., Fungi venet. nov. vel. Crit. 5: 189 (1878); Passalora circumscissa (Sacc.) U. Braun, Mycotaxon 55: 230 (1995); Pseudocercospora circumscissa (Sacc.) Y.L. Guo & X.J. Liu, Mycosystema 2: 231 (1989); Sphaerella cerasella (Aderh.) Sacc. & P. Syd., Syll. fung. (Abellini) 16: 469 (1902)

Species of fungus

Mycosphaerella cerasella is a fungal plant pathogen and the primary cause of brown shot-hole disease of cherry trees in Korea.

== See also ==
- List of Mycosphaerella species
