= Mycosphaerella confusa =

Scientific classification
- Kingdom: Fungi
- Division: Ascomycota
- Class: Dothideomycetes
- Order: Mycosphaerellales
- Family: Mycosphaerellaceae
- Genus: Mycosphaerella
- Species: M. confusa

Binomial name
- Mycosphaerella confusa F.A. Wolf, (1936)

Synonyms
- Cercospora rubi Sacc., (1876); Pseudocercospora rubi (Sacc.) Deighton, (1976); Pseudocercospora rubi var. rubi (Sacc.) Deighton, (1976)

Species of fungus

Mycosphaerella confusa is a fungal plant pathogen.

== See also ==
- List of Mycosphaerella species
