= Mycosphaerella palmicola =

Scientific classification
- Kingdom: Fungi
- Division: Ascomycota
- Class: Dothideomycetes
- Order: Mycosphaerellales
- Family: Mycosphaerellaceae
- Genus: Mycosphaerella
- Species: M. palmicola

Binomial name
- Mycosphaerella palmicola Chaudhury & P.N. Rao (1964)

Species of fungus

Mycosphaerella palmicola is a fungal plant pathogen that causes leaf spot in Cocos nucifera. It is found in Australia, Irian Jaya, Papua New Guinea.

== See also ==
- List of Mycosphaerella species
