= Mycosphaerella dendroides =

Scientific classification
- Kingdom: Fungi
- Division: Ascomycota
- Class: Dothideomycetes
- Order: Mycosphaerellales
- Family: Mycosphaerellaceae
- Genus: Mycosphaerella
- Species: M. dendroides

Binomial name
- Mycosphaerella dendroides (Cooke) Demaree & Cole (1930)

Species of fungus

Mycosphaerella dendroides is a fungal plant pathogen.

== See also ==
- List of Mycosphaerella species
