= Mycosphaerella rosicola =

Scientific classification
- Kingdom: Fungi
- Division: Ascomycota
- Class: Dothideomycetes
- Order: Mycosphaerellales
- Family: Mycosphaerellaceae
- Genus: Mycosphaerella
- Species: M. rosicola

Binomial name
- Mycosphaerella rosicola B.H. Davis (1937)

Species of fungus

Mycosphaerella rosicola is a fungal plant pathogen that causes leaf spot of rose.

== See also ==
- List of Mycosphaerella species
