= Mycosphaerella polymorpha =

Scientific classification
- Kingdom: Fungi
- Division: Ascomycota
- Class: Dothideomycetes
- Order: Mycosphaerellales
- Family: Mycosphaerellaceae
- Genus: Mycosphaerella
- Species: M. polymorpha

Binomial name
- Mycosphaerella polymorpha D.J. Sm. & C.O. Sm. (1941)

Species of fungus

Mycosphaerella polymorpha is a fungal plant pathogen occurring on Platanus occidentalis.

== See also ==
- List of Mycosphaerella species
