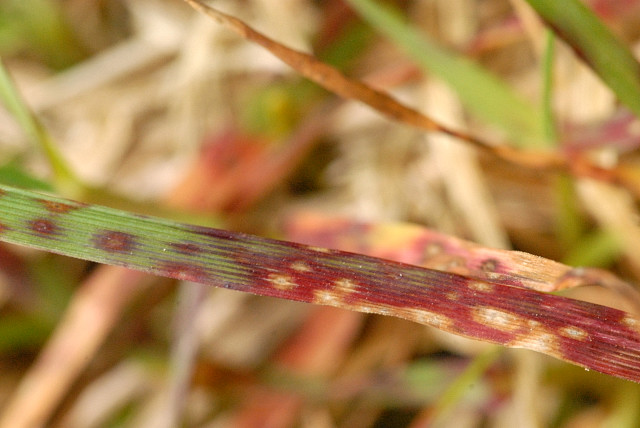
- Mycosphaerella recutita from Commanster, Belgian High Ardennes

Scientific classification
- Kingdom: Fungi
- Division: Ascomycota
- Class: Dothideomycetes
- Order: Capnodiales
- Family: Mycosphaerellaceae
- Genus: Mycosphaerella
- Species: M. recutita

Binomial name
- Mycosphaerella recutita (Fr.) Johanson, (1884)

Synonyms
- Carlia recutita (Fr.) Höhn., (1923); Cercospora graminis (Fuckel) Horsfall,(1930); Cercosporidium graminis (Fuckel) Deighton, (1967); Metasphaeria recutita (Fr.) Sacc., (1883); Mycosphaerella chlouna (Cooke) Lindau, (1897); Passalora graminis (Fuckel) Höhn., (1923); Scolicotrichum graminis Fuckel, (1870); Sphaerella chlouna Cooke, (1877); Sphaerella recutita (Fr.) Cooke, (1866); Sphaeria recutita Fr., (1823)

= Mycosphaerella recutita =

Species of fungus

Mycosphaerella recutita is a fungal plant pathogen.

In Iceland, it is rather common on withered Elymus caninus, Festuca rubra and Hierochloe odorata.

== See also ==
- List of Mycosphaerella species
