= Mycosphaerella lageniformis =

Scientific classification
- Kingdom: Fungi
- Division: Ascomycota
- Class: Dothideomycetes
- Order: Capnodiales
- Family: Mycosphaerellaceae
- Genus: Mycosphaerella
- Species: M. lageniformis

Binomial name
- Mycosphaerella lageniformis Rehm (1911)

Species of fungus

Mycosphaerella lageniformis is a fungal plant pathogen affecting citrus trees.

== See also ==
- List of Mycosphaerella species
