= Mycosphaerella areola =

Scientific classification
- Kingdom: Fungi
- Division: Ascomycota
- Class: Dothideomycetes
- Order: Capnodiales
- Family: Mycosphaerellaceae
- Genus: Mycosphaerella
- Species: M. areola

Binomial name
- Mycosphaerella areola Ehrlich & F.A. Wolf (1932)

Synonyms
- Cercosporella gossypii Ramularia areola Ramularia gossypii Ramulariopsis gossypii Septocylindrium areola Septocylindrium gossypii Symphyosira areola

Species of fungus pathogen infecting cotton

Mycosphaerella areola is the confirmed sexual (teleomorphic) stage of Ramularia areola, the causal agent of Ramularia leaf blight in cotton. The association between the two morphs was first proposed by Ehrlich and Wolf in 1932, and later validated through morphological, pathological, and molecular evidence, including its rDNA sequence concordance.

== Taxonomy and Biology ==
Members of Mycosphaerella constitute a large, morphologically diverse group of Dothideomycetes, many of which possess anamorphs historically classified within more than 20 genera. M. areola forms sexual fruiting bodies (ascomata) on senescent or decaying cotton foliage. These ascomata typically measure 40–60 μm in diameter and contain bitunicate asci, each producing eight hyaline, septate ascospores capable of germinating from both cells.

In addition to ascomata, overwintering leaf material frequently hosts sclerotia and spermagonia releasing rod-shaped spermatia; the ecological or reproductive role of these spermatia remains unresolved.

== Pathogenicity and Morph Connection ==
Pathogenicity assays have demonstrated that single-ascospore isolates of M. areola can produce typical Ramularia leaf blight lesions on susceptible cotton cultivars, from which R. areola can subsequently be reisolated. Complementary ITS rDNA analyses show near-complete genetic identity between the two morphs. Together, these findings establish M. areola as the functional teleomorph of R. areola.

== Epidemiological Significance ==
The discovery of M. areola in field residues has important implications for the epidemiology of Ramularia leaf blight. Ascospores produced on post-harvest debris are believed to constitute a primary inoculum source at the onset of the growing season—a role previously attributed mainly to conidia.

Because ascospores are generally dispersed over short distances and produced near the soil surface, secondary spread during the crop cycle is thought to depend largely on the airborne conidia of R. areola.

Field studies in Brazil indicate that agricultural practices such as monoculture cotton systems and inadequate destruction of crop residues facilitate the survival of the teleomorph from one season to the next, potentially contributing to recurrent and severe epidemics. The presence of a functional sexual cycle may also enable the emergence of new pathotypes through recombination.

== Disease Management ==
Sustainable management strategies emphasize reducing the carryover of sexual structures in crop debris. Recommended approaches include:

- implementation of intelligent crop-rotation systems, particularly with non-host cover crops (e.g., Brachiaria spp.);
- deployment of resistant cultivars developed through conventional or marker-assisted breeding;
- strict residue management following harvest;
- and integrated production systems incorporating reduced tillage or pasture–crop rotation.

Although fungicides remain widely used, reliance on repeated chemical applications is considered unsustainable and insufficient in regions where the teleomorph persists.

== See also ==
- List of Mycosphaerella species
