= Mycosphaerella bolleana =

Scientific classification
- Domain: Eukaryota
- Kingdom: Fungi
- Division: Ascomycota
- Class: Dothideomycetes
- Order: Capnodiales
- Family: Mycosphaerellaceae
- Genus: Mycosphaerella
- Species: M. bolleana

Binomial name
- Mycosphaerella bolleana B.B.Higgins, (1920)

Synonyms
- Septosporium bolleanum Thüm., (1877); Cercospora bolleana (Thüm.) Speg., (1879); Passalora bolleana (Thüm.) U.Braun, (1995); Cercosporidium bolleanum (Thuemen) X.J.Liu & Y.L.Guo

Species of fungus

Mycosphaerella bolleana is a fungal plant pathogen.

== See also ==
- List of Mycosphaerella species
