= Mycosphaerella eumusae =

Scientific classification
- Domain: Eukaryota
- Kingdom: Fungi
- Division: Ascomycota
- Class: Dothideomycetes
- Order: Capnodiales
- Family: Mycosphaerellaceae
- Genus: Mycosphaerella
- Species: M. eumusae

Binomial name
- Mycosphaerella eumusae Carlier, M.-F. Zapater, Lapeyre, D.R. Jones & Mour. (2000)

Species of fungus

Mycosphaerella eumusae is a fungal disease of banana (Musa spp.), causing Eumusae leaf spot. Its symptoms are similar to black leaf streak (Black Sigatoka, ). M. eumusae is the predominant Mycospharella of banana in mainland Malaysia and in Thailand, and is present in Mauritius and Nigeria. Septoria eumusae is an anamorph of Mycosphaerella eumusae.

== See also ==
- List of Mycosphaerella species
