= Mycosphaerella musae =

Scientific classification
- Kingdom: Fungi
- Division: Ascomycota
- Class: Dothideomycetes
- Order: Mycosphaerellales
- Family: Mycosphaerellaceae
- Genus: Mycosphaerella
- Species: M. musae

Binomial name
- Mycosphaerella musae (Speg.) Syd. & P. Syd. (1917)

Species of fungus

Mycosphaerella musae is a fungal plant pathogen.

== See also ==
- List of Mycosphaerella species
