= Mycosphaerella punctiformis =

Scientific classification
- Domain: Eukaryota
- Kingdom: Fungi
- Division: Ascomycota
- Class: Dothideomycetes
- Order: Capnodiales
- Family: Mycosphaerellaceae
- Genus: Mycosphaerella
- Species: M. punctiformis

Binomial name
- Mycosphaerella punctiformis (Pers.) Starbäck (1889)

Synonyms
- Asteromella maculiformis (Sacc.) Petr.,: 145 (1929); Cryptosphaeria punctiformis (Pers.) Grev. Guignardia maculiformis (Pers.) Mig., (1913); Mycosphaerella maculiformis (Pers.) J. Schröt., (1894); Mycosphaerella salicicola (Fuckel) Johanson ex Oudem., (1897); Phyllosticta betulina Sacc., (1884); Phyllosticta maculiformis Sacc.,(1882); Sphaerella arcana Cooke, (1866); Sphaerella corylaria (Wallr.) Fuckel, (1870); Sphaerella maculiformis (Pers.) Auersw., (1869); Sphaerella maculiformis var. aequalis Cooke; Sphaerella punctiformis Cooke, (1884); Sphaerella punctiformis (Pers.) Rabenh., (1869); Sphaerella simulans Cooke, (1866); Sphaerella sparsa Auersw., (1869); Sphaeria corylaria Wallr., (1833); Sphaeria maculiformis Pers., (1797); Sphaeria punctiformis Pers., (1794); Sphaeria punctiformis var. hederae Hook.

Species of fungus

Mycosphaerella punctiformis is a fungal plant pathogen.

In Iceland it is common on the dead leaves of Betula pubescens and Salix lanata.

== See also ==
- List of Mycosphaerella species
