= Mycosphaerella striatiformans =

Scientific classification
- Kingdom: Fungi
- Division: Ascomycota
- Class: Dothideomycetes
- Order: Mycosphaerellales
- Family: Mycosphaerellaceae
- Genus: Mycosphaerella
- Species: M. striatiformans

Binomial name
- Mycosphaerella striatiformans Cobb (1906)

Species of fungus

Mycosphaerella striatiformans is a fungal plant pathogen.

== See also ==
- List of Mycosphaerella species
