= Mycosphaerella stigmina-platani =

Scientific classification
- Kingdom: Fungi
- Division: Ascomycota
- Class: Dothideomycetes
- Order: Mycosphaerellales
- Family: Mycosphaerellaceae
- Genus: Mycosphaerella
- Species: M. stigmina-platani

Binomial name
- Mycosphaerella stigmina-platani F.A. Wolf, Mycologia 30: 60 (1938)

Synonyms
- Xenostigmina wolfii Crous & Corlett, (1999)

Species of fungus

Mycosphaerella stigmina-platani is a fungal plant pathogen.

== See also ==
- List of Mycosphaerella species
