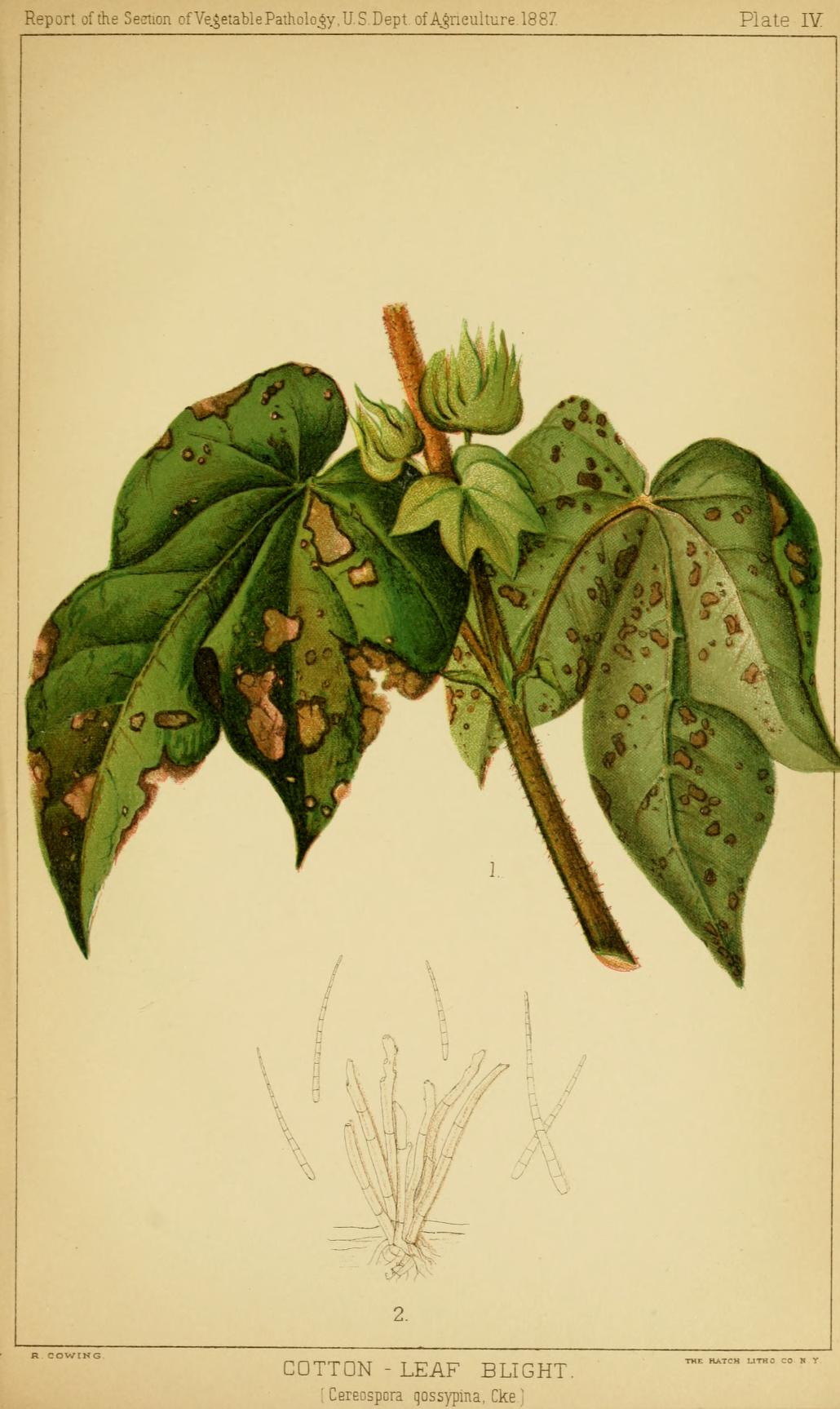

Scientific classification
- Kingdom: Fungi
- Division: Ascomycota
- Class: Dothideomycetes
- Order: Mycosphaerellales
- Family: Mycosphaerellaceae
- Genus: Mycosphaerella
- Species: M. gossypina

Binomial name
- Mycosphaerella gossypina (Cooke) Everh.

Synonyms
- Cercospora gossypina Cooke, (1883); Mycosphaerella gossypina (G.F. Atk.) Earle, (1900); Sphaerella gossypina G.F. Atk., (1891)

= Mycosphaerella gossypina =

Species of fungus

Mycosphaerella gossypina is a plant pathogen.

== See also ==
- List of Mycosphaerella species
