= Common spot of strawberry =

Plant fungal disease

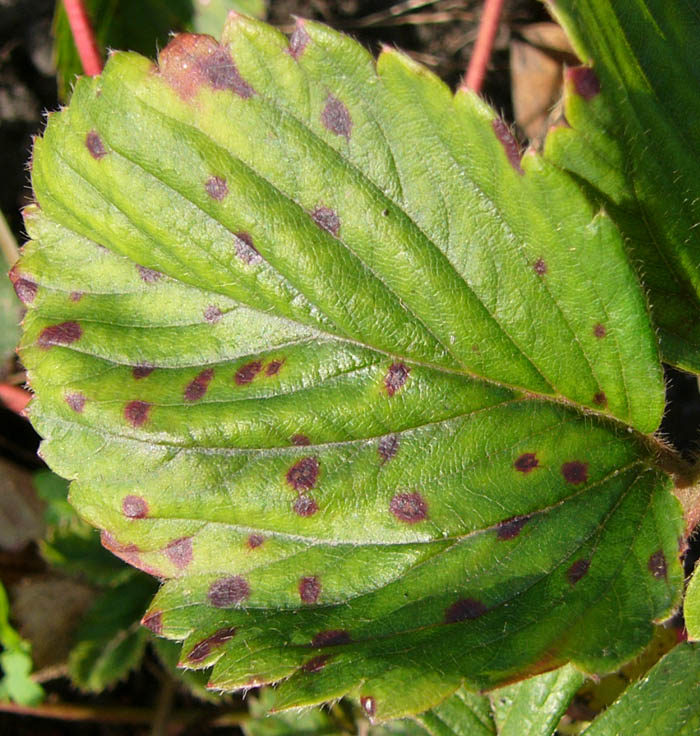
- Younger stadium of Mycosphaerella fragariae on strawberry
- Common names: Common leaf spot, leaf blight of strawberry
- Causal agents: Mycosphaerella fragariae
- Hosts: Strawberry
- EPPO Code: MYCOFR

Common spot of strawberry
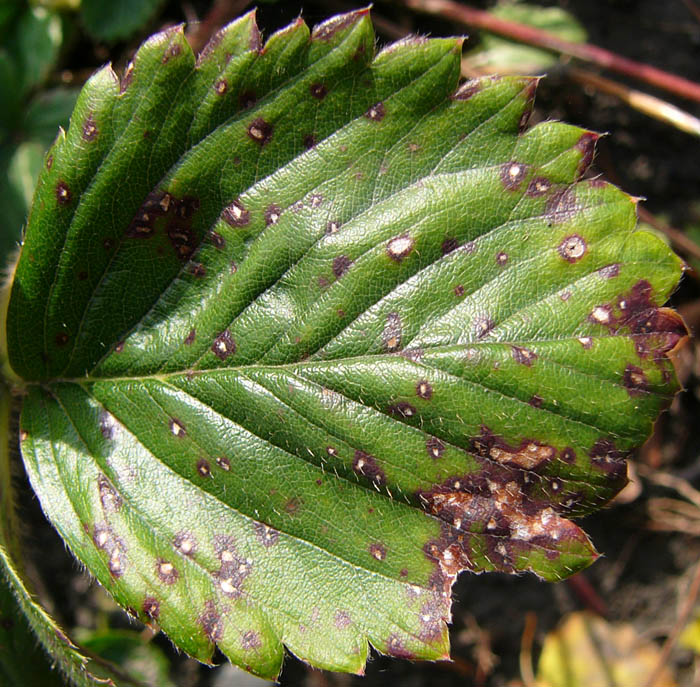
- Older stadium of Mycosphaerella fragariae on strawberry

Scientific classification
- Kingdom: Fungi
- Division: Ascomycota
- Class: Dothideomycetes
- Order: Mycosphaerellales
- Family: Mycosphaerellaceae
- Genus: Mycosphaerella
- Species: M. fragariae

Binomial name
- Mycosphaerella fragariae (Tul.) Lindau, 1897

Synonyms
- Cylindrosporium grevilleanum Tul.; Ramularia grevilleana (Tul.) Jørst., (1945); anamorph Ramularia tulasnei Sacc., (1886); Sphaerella fragariae (Tul. & C. Tul.) Sacc., (1882); Sphaeria fragariae Tul., (1856); Stigmatea fragariae Tul. & C. Tul., (1863)

Common spot of strawberry is one of the most common and widespread diseases afflicting the strawberry. Common spot of strawberry is caused by the fungus Mycosphaerella fragariae (imperfect stage is Ramularia tulasnei). Symptoms of this disease first appear as circular, dark purple spots on the leaf surface. Mycosphaerella fragariae is very host-specific and only infects strawberry.

== Hosts and symptoms ==
This disease affects strawberry plant foliage causing purple spots 1/8 to 1/4 in (3.2 to 6.4 mm) in diameter across on the upper side of the leaves. At first, the whole spot is purple but as the disease matures the center of the leaf spots on older leaves become tan or gray, then almost white. Lesions on younger leaves remain light brown. When numerous spots merge foliage death can occur; this can stunt or kill infected plants when severe.

On petioles, stolons, calyxes, and fruit trusses, elongated lesions may form and interfere with water transport in the plant, weakening the plant and making it more susceptible to invasion by a secondary organism. The fungus may infect the fruit in the form of black seed disease, discoloring the achenes.

== Disease cycle ==
The disease cycle starts when the pathogen overwinters as mycelium or fruiting structures in leaf debris and spores are spread by rain splash infecting new leaves as they emerge in the spring when conditions are favorable. Disease development is most successful in cool daytime temperatures and cold nighttime temperatures, high relative humidity, and wet conditions.

Common spot on strawberry is a polycyclic disease, and under favorable conditions it will continue to reinfect the host and surrounding plants. The fungus overwinters as mycelium, sclerotia, and perithecia in infected leaf tissues. This disease on strawberry can generate two types of spores that infect newly emerging leaves in the spring, conidia spores and ascospores.

Older infected leaves that remain alive during winter may give rise to conidia that are spread to new foliage by splashing water or human contamination. Another type of spore (ascospore) is generated in speck-sized black perithecia, which are produced at the edges of the leaf spots during autumn. In the spring, these ascospores are ejected from the perithecia and spread by wind or water to infect new leaf tissue. Infected leaves that survive the winter can reinfect. Under favorable conditions, dispersal of this disease will continue by splashing water or machinery.

== Environment ==
High rainfall and warm temperatures are most favorable for this pathogen and lead to rapid disease development. During mid to late spring, infections may be most severe due to frequent rain showers. The optimal temperature that will allow for most successful growth of the pathogen and development of disease is around 25 °C. The fungal pathogen favors 12 or more hours of leaf wetness for infection. New, young foliage has been found to be more susceptible to the pathogen when compared to mature, developed foliage.

== Management ==
This disease is hard to control because plants can carry the pathogen prior to showing any symptoms. It is important to be aware of where new plants are being planted so that they aren't exposed to disease.

The most effective method to avoid disease is to plant resistant cultivars that are specific to the location of planting. Some examples of resistant cultivars include Allstar, Cardinal, Delite, Honeoye, Jewel and Tennessee Beauty. Examples of susceptible cultivars that should be avoided include Sparkle, Sunrise, Raritan and Catskill.

Amongst the many different management strategies, cultural control practices play a significant role in prevention or reduction of disease. Some common cultural practices that have been used are as follows. In order to have more successful yields, strawberry plants should be planted in well-drained soil, in an area exposed to plentiful available sunlight and air circulation. Presence of weeds may reduce air circulation for strawberry plants and create a shaded, moist environment, which would make the plants more wet and susceptible to disease. Therefore, weed growth needs to be prevented, either by chemical or cultural control methods. Immediately after harvest, any severely infected plants and plant debris should be raked, removed and burned completely to get rid of any remaining spores and reduce inoculum of the pathogen. Additionally, avoid overhead irrigation in fields to reduce spread by water splash.

At the beginning of renovation, which occurs after harvest, one application of nitrogen fertilizers should be applied to help with canopy regrowth. About 4–6 weeks later, it is generally a good time to apply another application of nitrogen fertilization to the developing strawberry plants. This will allow for the plants to absorb nutrients provided by the fertilizer. However, applying too much nitrogen fertilizer throughout the spring, may result in an abundance of young foliage tissues that could be susceptible to disease.

Fungicides are not necessarily required, however if the strawberry grower decides to use fungicides, they should be applied during early in the spring and immediately after renovation. A fungicide spray schedule may also be put into place. It is recommended to spray in intervals of about two weeks. Examples of some recommended fungicides are Bulletin 506-B2, Midwest Commercial Small Fruit and Grape Spray Guide for commercial growers and Bulletin 780, Controlling Disease and Insects in Home Fruit Plantings for backyard home growers.

== Importance ==
Before resistant cultivars were developed, the most important disease of strawberry that caused utmost economic impact was common spot of strawberry. Under favorable environmental conditions, this disease can cause serious reductions in strawberry yields, which would definitely be a problem for commercial growers. Although the disease will not completely kill the plants, several leaves will be destroyed and poor quality strawberries will be produced as a result.

Chart 1 shows that leafspot (also known as common spot of strawberry) has a 4 out of 5 rating in terms of occurrence and yield loss. A 1 indicates severe losses and frequent occurrences while a 5 indicates minimal losses and rare occurrences. Due to the development of resistant cultivars, compared to other diseases found on strawberries such as, gray mold, red stele, and black root rot, common spot of strawberry has become more manageable.

== See also ==
- List of strawberry diseases
