= Mycosphaerella citri =

Scientific classification
- Kingdom: Fungi
- Division: Ascomycota
- Class: Dothideomycetes
- Order: Mycosphaerellales
- Family: Mycosphaerellaceae
- Genus: Mycosphaerella
- Species: M. citri

Binomial name
- Mycosphaerella citri Whiteside, (1972)

Synonyms
- Cercospora citri-grisea F.E. Fisher, (1961); Stenella citri-grisea (F.E. Fisher) Sivan., (1984)

Species of fungus

Mycosphaerella citri is a fungal plant pathogen infecting citruses.

== See also ==
- List of citrus diseases
- List of Mycosphaerella species
