= Davidiella carinthiaca =

Scientific classification
- Domain: Eukaryota
- Kingdom: Fungi
- Division: Ascomycota
- Class: Dothideomycetes
- Order: Capnodiales
- Family: Davidiellaceae
- Genus: Davidiella
- Species: D. carinthiaca

Binomial name
- Davidiella carinthiaca (Jaap) Aptroot, (2006)

Synonyms
- Mycosphaerella carinthiaca Jaap, (1908); Sphaerella carinthiaca (Jaap) Sacc. & Trotter, (1913)

Species of fungus

Davidiella carinthiaca is a fungal plant pathogen infecting red clover.
