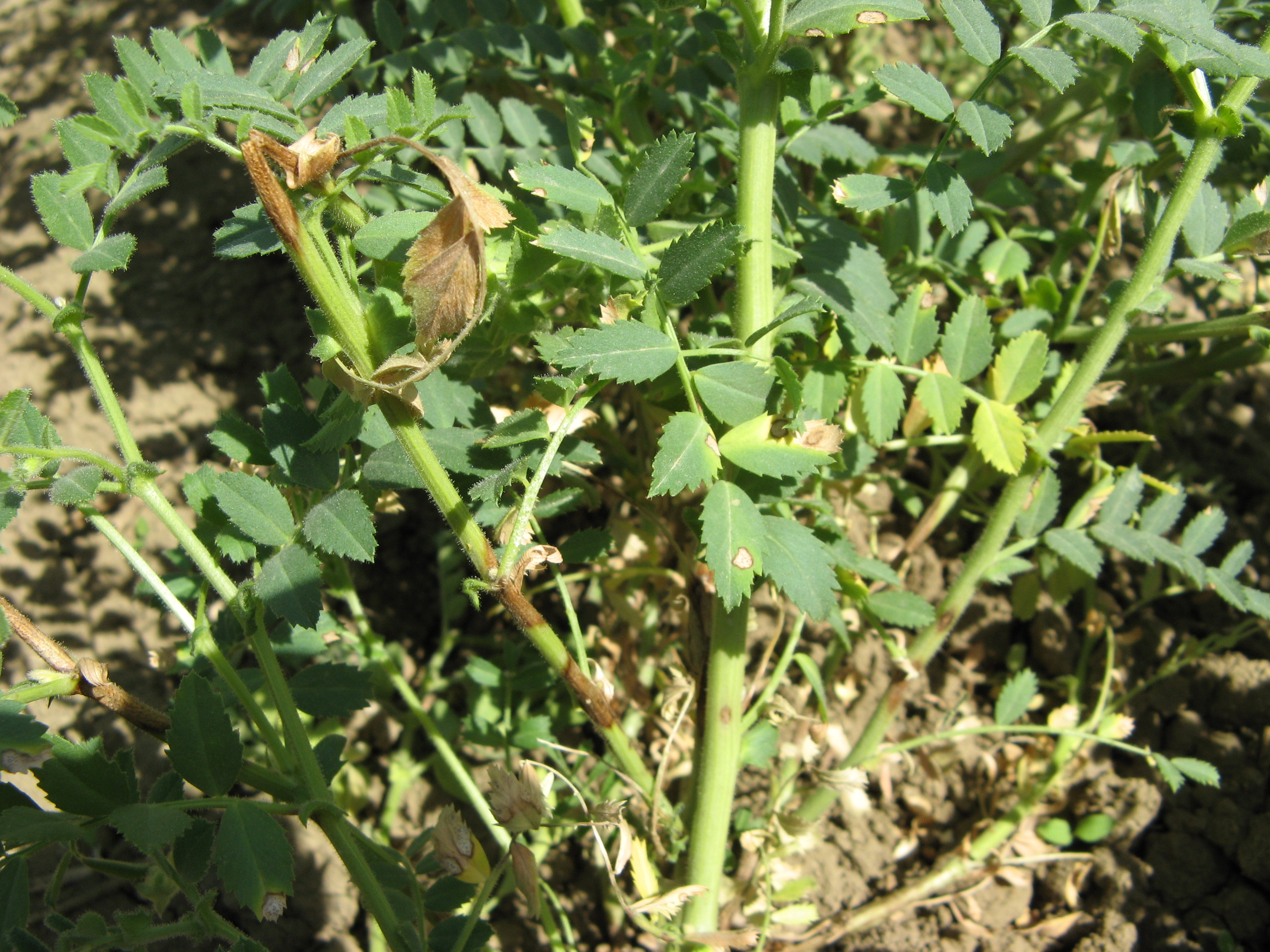
- Didymella rabiei growing on chickpea

Scientific classification
- Kingdom: Fungi
- Division: Ascomycota
- Class: Dothideomycetes
- Order: Pleosporales
- Family: Didymellaceae
- Genus: Didymella
- Species: D. rabiei

Binomial name
- Didymella rabiei (Kovatsch.) Arx, (1962)

Synonyms
- Mycosphaerella rabiei Kovatsch., (1936); Zythia rabiei Pass., (1867); Phyllosticta cicerina Prill. & Delacr. 1893; Phyllosticta rabiei (Pass.) Trotter, (1918); Ascochyta rabiei (Pass.) Labr., (1931); Phoma rabiei (Pass.) Khune, (1979); Phoma rabiei (Pass.) Khune & J.N. Kapoor, (1980); Phoma rabiei (Pass.) Khune ex Gruyter, (2002)

= Didymella rabiei =

Species of fungus

chickpea ascochyta blight
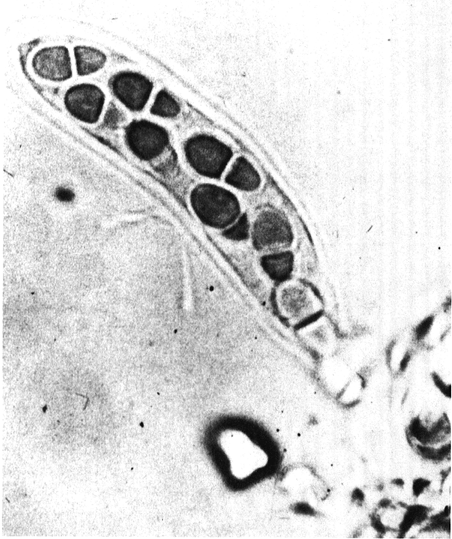
- Bitunicate ascus and ascospores of Didymella rabiei
- Common names: chickpea ascochyta, ascochyta blight, blight of chickpea
- Causal agents: Didymella rabiei
- Hosts: chickpea
- EPPO Code: MYCORA
- Distribution: worldwide in chickpea growing regions

Genomic information
- NCBI ID: GCA_001630375.1
- Ploidy: cannot be determined from assembly
- Genome size: 34.65
- Number of chromosomes: none scaffolded
- Year of completion: 2016

Didymella rabiei, commonly called chickpea ascochyta blight fungus, is a fungal plant pathogen of chickpea. Didymella rabiei is the teleomorph of Ascochyta rabiei, which is the anamorph, but both names refer to the same species. It is typically aneuploid with 12-16 chromosomes.

== Names ==
The specific epithet rabiei refers to rabbia del cece or 'rabies of chickpea', a name for the disease.

The disease is also referred to as ascochyta blight but there are other fungal species that cause diseases in other pulse species that also go by that term. It also goes by the name blight of chickpea. In French it is called anthracnose du pois-chiche (lit. 'chickpea anthracnose') or ascochytose du pois-chiche ('chickpea ascochyta'). In German it is referred to as Anthraknose: Kichererbse (anthracnose: chickpea'). It is called ascoquita del garbanzo ('chickpea ascochyta') or rabia del garbanzo ('chickpea rabies') in Spanish.

== Signs and symptoms ==
Once ascochyta blight has infected a healthy chickpea plant, it will start to develop lesions on all aerial plant parts. If a seed pod becomes infected, it may initially be asymptomatic, but will eventually develop dark lesions on the surface of the seed coats.

== Description ==
D. rabiei has a spherical punctiform and membranous pyrenium, at first lutescent then opening to a rounded black ostiole. It has numerous elliptical and hyaline spores or varying size. The fungus survives within the infected crop debris from the previous growing season. It requires the infected debris, because it does not produce resting spores that allow it to survive in the soil during the winter. When surviving in crop debris, it typically lasts longer if exposed to drier conditions. When both compatible mating types of the fungus are present, it is able to develop a pseudothecia that produces airborne spores. These airborne spores play a major role in the dispersal of the pathogen.

== Hosts ==
D. rabiei is known for infecting cultivated annual chickpea (Cicer arietinum), but also commonly infects other wild perennial chickpea species such as Cicer monbretti, Cicer ervoides, Cicer judaicum, and Cicer pinnatifidum.

Other host species include:

- dog fennel (Anthemis cotula)
- alfalfa (Medicago sativa)
- pea (Pisum sativum)
- Berseem clover (Trifolium alexandrinum)
- wheat (Triticum aestivum)
- faba bean (Vicia faba)
- hairy tare (Vicia hirsuta)
- cowpea (Vigna unguiculata)

== Proper management practices ==
The most important way to protect susceptible crops from this pathogen is to use resistant cultivars when planting. However, this disease has multiple mating types, and may lead to pathogen resistance if the same cultivars are repeatedly used. To add to this, there are a number of cultural practices that can help reduce the vigor of D. rabiei. These include, but are not limited to: using certified disease free seed, rotation to new crops every two or three years, and planting in wide rows with adequate spacing.

== Effects on aquafaba ==
A chemical analysis of aquafaba indicated that a number of proteins in a particularly well-performing batch were found to be versions from D. rabiei, specifically tRNA (cytosine-5-)-methyltransferase, o-acyltransferase, oxidoreductase, histone H3, and histone H2B. It is unclear how much of an effect these proteins have on the properties of aquafaba.
