= Davidiella dianthi =

Scientific classification
- Kingdom: Fungi
- Division: Ascomycota
- Class: Dothideomycetes
- Order: Capnodiales
- Family: Davidiellaceae
- Genus: Davidiella
- Species: D. dianthi

Binomial name
- Davidiella dianthi (C.C. Burt) Crous & U. Braun, (2003)

Synonyms
- Cladosporium echinulatum (Berk.) G.A. de Vries, (1952); Didymellina dianthi C.C. Burt, (1936); Helminthosporium echinulatum Berk., (1870); Heterosporium echinulatum (Berk.) Cooke, (1877); Mycosphaerella dianthi (C.C. Burt) Jørst., (1945)

Species of fungus

Davidiella dianthi is a fungal plant pathogen infecting carnations.
