= P. angolensis =

P. angolensis may refer to:

- Pterocarpus angolensis, a tree species also called African teak
- Pycnanthus angolensis, a tree species also called African nutmeg
- Probergrothius angolensis, the Welwitschia bug
- Phaeoramularia angolensis, a fungal plant pathogen

== See also ==
- Angolensis
