= Heterosporium luci =

Scientific classification
- Kingdom: Fungi
- Division: Ascomycota
- Class: Dothideomycetes
- Order: Cladosporiales
- Family: Cladosporiaceae
- Genus: Heterosporium
- Species: H. luci

Binomial name
- Heterosporium luci Chevaug. (1956)

Species of fungus

Heterosporium luci is a species of fungus in the family Cladosporiaceae. The species is a fungal plant pathogen that has been recorded from the Central African Republic, the Ivory Coast, and Senegal.

== Taxonomy ==
The fungus was formally described by French phytopathologist Jean Chevaugeon in 1956. The type specimen was collected in Senegal.

Many species that have been historically placed in the genus Heterosporium have since been transferred to other genera, particularly Cladosporium. In their 2012 monograph on the genus Cladosporium, Konstanze Bensch and colleagues note that according to mycologist John David, who in 1997 revised the generic placement of many species previously in Heterosporium, H. luci probably does not belong in Cladosporium in the strict sense. David suggests that it is probably cercosporoid (referring to a form genus of imperfect fungi that are leaf parasites with long slender multiseptate spores) and is more likely to be appropriately classified in Passalora or Phaeoramularia, although no formal transfer to either of those genera have been made.

== Description ==
Heterosporium luci infects the plants cassava, Citrus, and Crotalaria retusa. The fungus appears on young twigs and branches, as well as on old fallen stems and on fruits; it can additionally cover stem cankers caused by Glomerella cingulata. These cankers become covered with a dense reddish-brown to blackish-brown mat formed by the septate conidiophores of H. luci. The conidia, usually triseptate (i.e., they contain 3 internal partitions, or septa), are cylindrical to rounded, light yellow-brown, foveolate (with small, pit-like depressions or indentations) and measure 19–30 by 4.5–6.5 μm.

== Distribution ==
Heterosporium luci has been recorded from the Central African Republic, the Ivory Coast, and Senegal.
