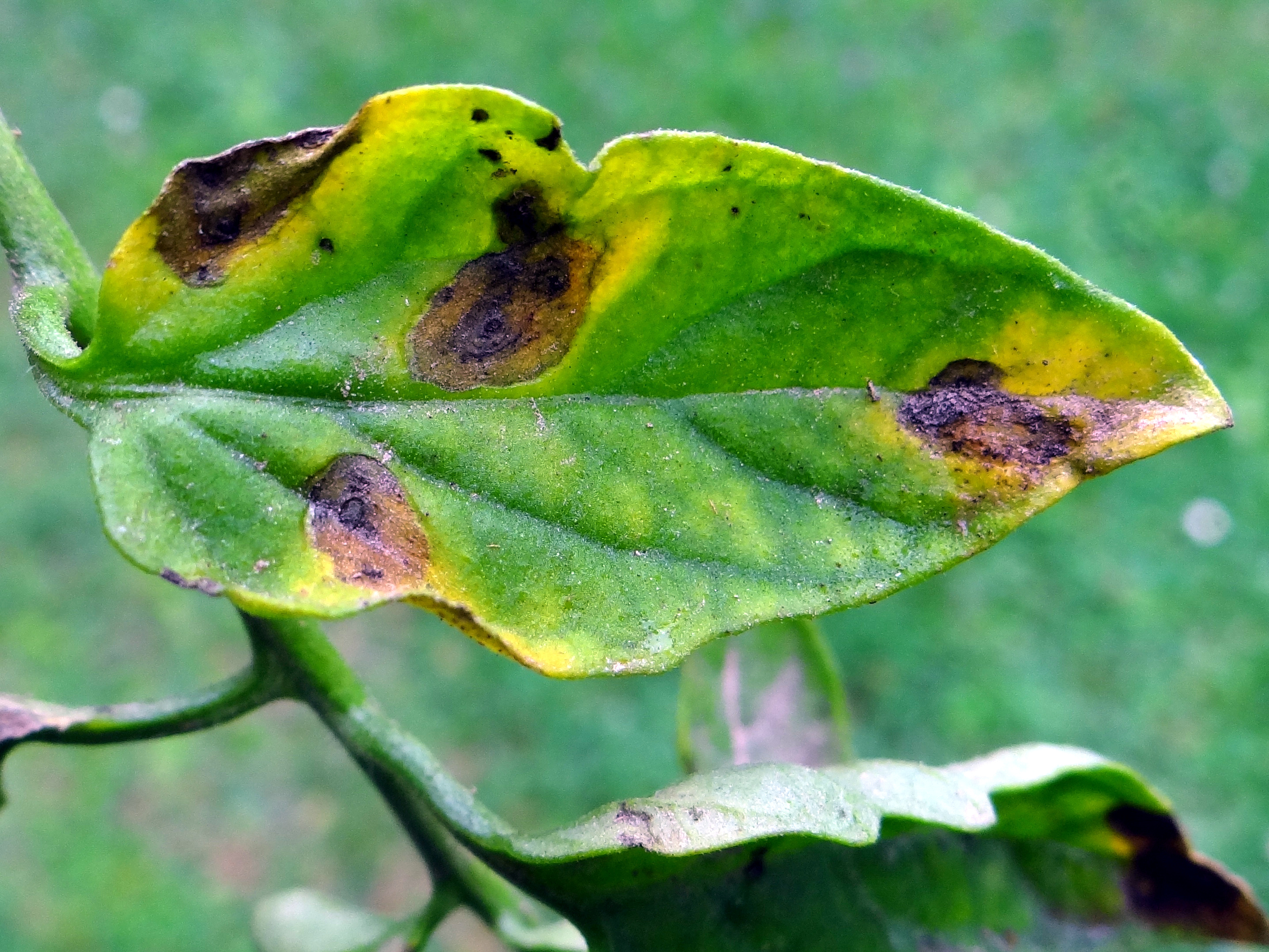
- Passalora fulva on Solanum lycopersicum

Scientific classification
- Kingdom: Fungi
- Division: Ascomycota
- Class: Dothideomycetes
- Order: Mycosphaerellales
- Family: Mycosphaerellaceae
- Genus: Passalora; Fr. (1849)

Type species
- Passalora bacilligera (Mont. & Fr.) Fresen. (1863)

Synonyms
- Berteromyces Cif. (1954); Cercodeuterospora Curzi (1932); Cercosporidium Earle (1901); Cercosporiopsis Miura (1928); Phaeoramularia Munt.-Cvetk. (1960); Tandonella S.S.Prasad & R.A.B.Verma (1970); Vellosiella Rangel (1915); Walkeromyces Thaung (1976)

= Passalora =

Genus of fungi

Passalora is a genus of fungi in the family Mycosphaerellaceae. As of September 2026, it contains 556 accepted species.

== Species ==
- Passalora abscondita (Deighton) U.Braun & Crous
- Passalora acalyphae (Tharp) U.Braun & Crous
- Passalora acanthicola (Hansf.) U.Braun & Crous
- Passalora acericola (X.J.Liu & Y.L.Guo) U.Braun & Crous
- Passalora acori (J.M.Yen) U.Braun & Crous
- Passalora acosmii A.Hern.-Gut. & Dianese
- Passalora acrocomiae Guatim. & R.W.Barreto
- Passalora actaeae (Ellis & Holw.) U.Braun & Crous
- Passalora adenocalymmatis U.Braun & Crous
- Passalora adenostemmatis (R.K. Verma & Kamal) U.Braun & Crous
- Passalora aenea (Cif.) U.Braun & Crous
- Passalora aesculina (Ellis & Kellerm.) U.Braun & Crous
- Passalora ageratinae Crous & A.R. Wood
- Passalora agrostidicola Phengs. & U.Braun
- Passalora ahmadii (Petr.) U.Braun & Crous
- Passalora ahmesii (Munt.-Cvetk.) U.Braun & Crous
- Passalora ajrekarii (Syd. & P.Syd.) U.Braun
- Passalora alni (Chupp & H.C. Greene) Deighton
- Passalora alocasiae (Syd. & P.Syd.) Rossman & W.C.Allen
- Passalora althaeigena (J.M.Yen & S.K. Sun) U.Braun & Crous
- Passalora amazonica U.Braun
- Passalora ambrosiae (Chupp) Crous & U.Braun
- Passalora amurensis (Ziling) H.D.Shin & U.Braun
- Passalora angelicae (Ellis & Everh.) U.Braun
- Passalora annonacearum A.N. Rai & Kamal
- Passalora annonigena U.Braun & F.O.Freire
- Passalora anomala (Ellis & Halst.) U.Braun & Crous
- Passalora antigoni (M.L.Farr) U.Braun & Crous
- Passalora antipus (Ellis & Holw.) U.Braun & Crous
- Passalora aphelandrae R.Kirschner
- Passalora aratai (Speg.) U.Braun, Delhey & Kiehr
- Passalora arctostaphyli Moreno-Rico & Crous
- Passalora ariae (Fuckel) U.Braun & Crous
- Passalora arrabidaeae (Chupp & Viégas) Crous, Alfenas & R.W.Barreto
- Passalora arracachae (Pat.) U.Braun & Crous
- Passalora arrectaria (Chupp) U.Braun & Crous
- Passalora arthraxonis (Y.L.Guo) U.Braun & Crous
- Passalora artocarpi Y.L.Guo
- Passalora arunci-dioici U.Braun & Crous
- Passalora asclepiadorae (Ellis & Kellerm.) U.Braun & Crous
- Passalora aseptata R.Singh bis
- Passalora asprellae (U.Braun) U.Braun & Crous
- Passalora assamensis (S.Chowdhury) U.Braun & Crous
- Passalora asteracearum Kamal
- Passalora asterata (G.F.Atk.) U.Braun & Crous
- Passalora astragali (Ellis & Holw.) U.Braun
- Passalora atrides (Syd.) Y.L.Guo
- Passalora atropunctata (Racib.) U.Braun & F.O.Freire
- Passalora atylosiae (Raghu Ram & Mallaiah) U.Braun & Crous
- Passalora austroplenckiae (A.Hern.-Gut. & Dianese) U.Braun
- Passalora avicularis (G. Winter) Crous, U.Braun & M.J.Morris
- Passalora bacilligera (Mont. & Fr.) Mont. & Fr.
- Passalora backmanii (Furlan. & Dianese) U.Braun
- Passalora balansae (Speg.) U.Braun
- Passalora bambusae (Cooke) Kamal
- Passalora barleriigena Meeboon & Hidayat
- Passalora barringtoniae-acutangulae (Kamal, B.K.Gupta & R.K.Verma) Poonam Srivast.
- Passalora barringtoniicola (Y.L.Guo) U.Braun & Crous
- Passalora barringtoniigena Kamal
- Passalora bartholomei (Ellis & Kellerm.) U.Braun & Crous
- Passalora bastardiae (Petr. & Cif.) U.Braun & Crous
- Passalora bataticola (Cif. & Bruner) U.Braun & Crous
- Passalora bauhiniae (Ellis & Everh.) U.Braun & Crous
- Passalora bauhiniicola U.Braun
- Passalora bauhiniigena U.Braun & Crous
- Passalora berkheyae (Syd. & P.Syd.) U.Braun & Crous
- Passalora berkheyae-maritimae (Crous & U.Braun) Crous & U.Braun
- Passalora bidenticola (Chupp) U.Braun & Crous
- Passalora biformis (Peck) U.Braun & Crous
- Passalora bixae Crous & Bench.
- Passalora bocconiae (Chupp) U.Braun & Crous
- Passalora boldoae (N.Pons) U.Braun, Crous & N.Pons
- Passalora bolleana (Thüm.) U.Braun
- Passalora bondartsevii U.Braun & Melnik
- Passalora brachyelytri (H.C. Greene) U.Braun & Bensch
- Passalora brandenburgeri U.Braun & Crous
- Passalora brasilianensis A.Hern.-Gut. & Dianese
- Passalora braunii (S.K.Singh, Arch. Singh & Kamal) U.Braun & Crous
- Passalora broussonetiae (Goh & W.H.Hsieh) U.Braun & Crous
- Passalora bruchiana (Speg.) U.Braun & Crous
- Passalora bryae U.Braun & Crous
- Passalora buddlejae (Deighton) U.Braun & Crous
- Passalora bunchosiae N. Pons, U.Braun & Crous
- Passalora bupleuri (Pass.) U.Braun
- Passalora buteae (Kamal, B.K.Gupta & C.Gupta) U.Braun & Crous
- Passalora buteae-parviflorae P.Srivast., S.Narayan & Meenu
- Passalora caesalpiniae (Bhalla, A.K.Sarbhoy, M.Kulshr. & K.P.S.Kushwaha) U.Braun, Dianese & A.Hern.-Gut
- Passalora caesalpiniicola Sh.Kumar & Raghv.Singh
- Passalora caespitosa (Ellis & Everh.) U.Braun
- Passalora cajani (Henn.) U.Braun & Crous
- Passalora caladii (F.Stevens) U.Braun & Sivap.
- Passalora caladiicola (Chupp) U.Braun
- Passalora calpurniae (Petch) U.Braun & Crous
- Passalora calystegiae (Speg.) U.Braun
- Passalora campi-silii (Speg.) U.Braun
- Passalora campinensis (Chupp & Viégas) Crous, Alfenas & R.W.Barreto
- Passalora capsicicola (Vassiljevsky) U.Braun & F.O.Freire
- Passalora cardiostegiae (B.H.Davis) U.Braun & Crous
- Passalora cardopatii (Bremer & Petr.) U.Braun
- Passalora carlinae (Sacc.) U.Braun & Crous
- Passalora cassiae (Henn.) U.Braun
- Passalora castellanii (Matta & Belliard) U.Braun
- Passalora catalparum (Chupp) U.Braun & Crous
- Passalora catenospora (G.F.Atk.) U.Braun & Crous
- Passalora caulophylli (Peck) U.Braun
- Passalora cayaponiae (F.Stevens & Solheim) U.Braun & Crous
- Passalora celtidicola (Munt.-Cvetk.) U.Braun & Crous
- Passalora centrosematis N.Pons, U.Braun & Crous
- Passalora cephalanthi (Ellis & Kellerm.) U.Braun & Crous
- Passalora cercidicola (Ellis) U.Braun
- Passalora cerradensis A.Hern.-Gut. & Dianese
- Passalora chaerophylli (Aderh.) U.Braun
- Passalora chaetocalycina (Petr. & Cif.) U.Braun
- Passalora chaetomium (Cooke) Arx
- Passalora chamaecristae (Ellis & Kellerm.) U.Braun
- Passalora chamaecristae-orbiculatae A.Hern.-Gut. & Dianese
- Passalora chamaecristicola A.Hern.-Gut. & Dianese
- Passalora chapadensis A.Hern.-Gut. & Dianese
- Passalora chionanthi (Ellis & Everh.) U.Braun
- Passalora chionea (Ellis & Everh.) U.Braun
- Passalora chonemorphae (R.C. Rajak & A.K. Pandey) Kamal
- Passalora choristigmatis (Syd. & P.Syd.) U.Braun & Crous
- Passalora christianae (Deighton) U.Braun & Crous
- Passalora chuppii (Viégas) U.Braun & Crous
- Passalora ciferrii (Chupp) U.Braun & Crous
- Passalora cimicifugae (F.Y. Zhai, Y.L.Guo & Yu Li) F.Y. Zhai, Y.L.Guo & Yu Li
- Passalora citricola Crous & U.Braun
- Passalora citrigena Crous & U.Braun
- Passalora clavata (W.R. Gerard) U.Braun
- Passalora clematidina U.Braun & Crous
- Passalora clematidis (R.K. Verma & Kamal) U.Braun & Crous
- Passalora clematidis-gourianae U.Braun & Crous
- Passalora clerodendri (Goh & W.H.Hsieh) U.Braun & Crous
- Passalora cnidii (Constant.) Poonam Srivast.
- Passalora cnidoscolicola U.Braun & F.O.Freire
- Passalora cnidoscolifolii (Bat., Peres & O.A.Drumm.) U.Braun & F.O.Freire
- Passalora coalescens (Davis) U.Braun & Crous
- Passalora cocculi-trilobi Y.L.Guo
- Passalora codonopsidis (Y.L.Guo) U.Braun & Crous
- Passalora collomiae (U.Braun & Rogerson) U.Braun & Crous
- Passalora colocasiae (Höhn.) U.Braun
- Passalora colubrinae (Chupp & Viégas) Crous, Alfenas & R.W.Barreto
- Passalora compacta (Berk. & M.A.Curtis) U.Braun & Crous
- Passalora compressa (Allesch.) Petr.
- Passalora concors (Casp.) U.Braun & Crous
- Passalora condensata (Ellis & Kellerm.) U.Braun
- Passalora congoensis (Syd. & P.Syd.) U.Braun & Crous
- Passalora consimilis (Syd.) U.Braun & Crous
- Passalora convolvuli (Tracy & Earle) U.Braun & Crous
- Passalora cordiae (P.Kumar & Kamal) U.Braun & Crous
- Passalora cordobensis (Speg.) U.Braun
- Passalora cordylines (Henn.) Crous & M.P.S.Câmara
- Passalora corni Y.L.Guo
- Passalora cornicola Y.L.Guo
- Passalora cornifoliae (Chupp) U.Braun & Crous
- Passalora costaricensis (Syd.) U.Braun & Crous
- Passalora costi (A.K. Singh, Shiv K. Singh & Kamal) U.Braun & Crous
- Passalora cotini U.Braun
- Passalora crotonifolia (Cooke) Crous, U.Braun & Alfenas
- Passalora crotonis (Ellis & Everh.) U.Braun & Crous
- Passalora crotonis-gossypiifolii U.Braun & Urtiaga
- Passalora crotonis-oligandri (J.M.Yen & Gilles) U.Braun & Crous
- Passalora crotonophila (Speg.) Crous
- Passalora cucurbiticola (Henn.) U.Braun & Crous
- Passalora curcumae Purkay. & Mallik
- Passalora curvispora (Goh & W.H.Hsieh) U.Braun & Crous
- Passalora cyathulae (F.Stevens & Solheim) U.Braun & Crous
- Passalora cyperi (D. Gupta, Padhi & Chowdhry) U.Braun & Crous
- Passalora dalbergiae (S.K.Singh & P.N. Singh) U.Braun, Dianese & A.Hern.-Gut.
- Passalora dalbergiicola (T.S. Ramakr. & K. Ramakr.) U.Braun & Crous
- Passalora davillae U.Braun, J.C.David & F.O.Freire
- Passalora deightonii (N.Pons & B.Sutton) U.Braun & Crous
- Passalora delamonicae A.Hern.-Gut. & Dianese
- Passalora delicatissima (Kalchbr. & Cooke) U.Braun & Crous
- Passalora delphinii (F.Y.Zhai, Y.L.Guo & Yu Li) F.Y.Zhai, Y.L.Guo & Yu Li
- Passalora desmanthi (Ellis & Kellerm.) U.Braun
- Passalora desmodii (Ellis & Kellerm.) U.Braun
- Passalora destruens (F. Anderson, Delhey & U.Braun) U.Braun & Crous
- Passalora dichanthii-annulati (R.K. Chaudhary, S.K.Singh & P.N.Singh) U.Braun
- Passalora dichondrae (Crous & U.Braun) U.Braun & Crous
- Passalora diffusa (Ellis & Everh.) U.Braun & Crous
- Passalora digitariae (Crous & B.Sutton) U.Braun & Crous
- Passalora diodiae (Cooke) Crous, U.Braun & Alfenas
- Passalora dioscoreae-nipponicae Y.L.Guo
- Passalora dioscoreae-subcalvae Y.L.Guo
- Passalora dioscoreicola Y.L.Guo
- Passalora dioscoreigena U.Braun & Crous
- Passalora diospyri Crous, Alfenas & R.W.Barreto
- Passalora dipterocarpi Phengs., Chukeat., K.D.Hyde & U.Braun
- Passalora dissiliens (Duby) U.Braun & Crous
- Passalora dodonaeae Crous & U.Braun
- Passalora dolichoides (N. Srivast., A.K. Srivast. & Kamal) U.Braun & Crous
- Passalora dombeyae (Crous & U.Braun) U.Braun & Crous
- Passalora dubia (Riess) U.Braun
- Passalora dulcamarae (Peck) U.Braun & Crous
- Passalora duplicans (Chupp) U.Braun & Crous
- Passalora ecuadoriana (Constant.) U.Braun & Crous
- Passalora effusa (Berk. & M.A.Curtis) U.Braun
- Passalora eitenii R.B. Medeiros & Dianese
- Passalora elaeochroma (Sacc.) U.Braun & Crous
- Passalora elata (Sacc.) U.Braun & Crous
- Passalora emblicae Dadwal, S. Bhartiya & R.K.Verma
- Passalora emmeorhizae U.Braun & Urtiaga
- Passalora eucalyptorum (Crous) Crous & U.Braun
- Passalora eugeniae Crous
- Passalora euodiae (Syd. & P.Syd.) Goh & W.H.Hsieh
- Passalora eupatorii (A.K.Das) Kamal
- Passalora euphorbiae (Karak.) Arx
- Passalora euphorbiicola U.Braun & Crous
- Passalora fagarina (Chupp) Crous & U.Braun
- Passalora ficina (S.K.Singh & R.K.Chaudhary) U.Braun & Crous
- Passalora flemingiae (X.J.Liu & Y.L.Guo) U.Braun
- Passalora flexuosa (Tracy & Earle) U.Braun & Crous
- Passalora foeniculi M.Kamal & S.A.Khan
- Passalora foveolicola (Speg.) K.Schub. & U.Braun
- Passalora fraxini (DC.) Arx
- Passalora fraxinicola (Ershad) U.Braun & Crous
- Passalora fujikuroi (N. Pons) U.Braun & Crous
- Passalora fuliginosa (Ellis & Kellerm.) Crous, Alfenas & R.W.Barreto
- Passalora fuscovirens (Sacc.) U.Braun & Crous
- Passalora galactiae (Ellis & Everh.) U.Braun & Crous
- Passalora galii (Ellis & Holw.) Arx
- Passalora gayophyti (Ellis & Everh.) U.Braun & Crous
- Passalora gentianae (Peck) U.Braun & Crous
- Passalora geranii Y.L.Guo
- Passalora gerardiae (Ellis & Dearn.) U.Braun
- Passalora gilbertii (Speg.) U.Braun
- Passalora gliricidiae (Syd. & P.Syd.) U.Braun & Crous
- Passalora gliricidiasis (Gonz. Frag. & Cif.) R.F. Castañeda & U.Braun
- Passalora gmelinae-arboreae (A.K. Sarbhoy, Hosag. & N. Ahmad) U.Braun & Crous
- Passalora gmelinicola C.Nakash. & Meeboon
- Passalora goaensis (S.K.Singh, Dhanorkar & Waing.) Kamal
- Passalora gochnatiicola O.L.Pereira & U.Braun
- Passalora gomphrenicola (Speg.) U.Braun
- Passalora gonatoclada (Syd.) U.Braun & Crous
- Passalora gonostegiae (Goh & W.H.Hsieh) U.Braun & Crous
- Passalora gotoana (Togashi) U.Braun
- Passalora granuliformis (Ellis & Holw.) U.Braun
- Passalora greciana (Syd.) U.Braun & Crous
- Passalora grewiae (H.C. Srivast. & P.R.Mehta) U.Braun & Crous
- Passalora grewiigena U.Braun & Crous
- Passalora guanicensis (F.Stevens) U.Braun & R.F.Castañeda
- Passalora guaranitica (Speg.) U.Braun & Crous
- Passalora guimaranhesensis A.Hern.-Gut. & Dianese
- Passalora guoana U.Braun
- Passalora guraniae R.Kirschner
- Passalora gymnocladi (Ellis & Kellerm.) U.Braun
- Passalora haldinae C.Nakash. & Meeboon
- Passalora halesiicola U.Braun, D.F.Farr & Minnis
- Passalora halstedii (Ellis & Everh.) U.Braun & Crous
- Passalora hamamelidis (Peck) U.Braun & Crous
- Passalora hameliae (Chupp) U.Braun & Crous
- Passalora hariotii (Speg.) U.Braun & Crous
- Passalora helianthi (Ellis & Everh.) U.Braun & Crous
- Passalora helianthicola U.Braun & Crous
- Passalora helicteris (Soni, Dadwal & Jamaluddin) Poonam Srivast.
- Passalora helicteris-viscidae Phengs., Chukeat., K.D.Hyde & U.Braun
- Passalora heliotropii (Ellis & Everh.) U.Braun & Crous
- Passalora heliotropiigena U.Braun
- Passalora heterospora (Höhn.) Höhn.
- Passalora heterosporella U.Braun & Crous
- Passalora holobrunnea (J.M.Yen) U.Braun & Crous
- Passalora hughesii (Munt.-Cvetk.) U.Braun & Crous
- Passalora hydrocotyles (Ellis & Everh.) U.Braun, Delhey & Kiehr
- Passalora hydrophylli (Ellis & Everh.) U.Braun
- Passalora hyperici (Tehon & E.Y. Daniels) U.Braun
- Passalora hyptidigena (Kamal, A.S.Moses & R.Chaudhary) U.Braun & Crous
- Passalora hyptidis (Speg.) U.Braun
- Passalora ibatiae U.Braun & Crous
- Passalora ilicis Y.L.Guo
- Passalora imperatae (Syd. & P.Syd.) U.Braun & Crous
- Passalora incarnata (Deighton) U.Braun & Crous
- Passalora indogangetica P.Srivast., S.Narayan & Meenu
- Passalora iochromatis (Pat.) U.Braun
- Passalora iresines (Munt.-Cvetk.) U.Braun & Crous
- Passalora isolonae (Siboe, P.M.Kirk & P.F.Cannon) U.Braun & Crous
- Passalora isotomae (Cif.) U.Braun & Crous
- Passalora jacquiniana (Thüm.) U.Braun
- Passalora janseana (Racib.) U.Braun
- Passalora jatrophigena U.Braun & F.O.Freire
- Passalora josensis (Syd.) U.Braun & Crous
- Passalora koepkei (W.Krüger) U.Braun & Crous
- Passalora kreiseliana U.Braun & Crous
- Passalora lactucae (Henn.) U.Braun & Crous
- Passalora lactucicola (Y.Cui & Z.Y.Zhang) K.Schub. & U.Braun
- Passalora lantanae (Chupp) U.Braun & Crous
- Passalora lantaniphila (Crous & M.J.Morris) Crous & U.Braun
- Passalora lateritia (Ellis & Halst.) U.Braun & Crous
- Passalora lathyri-aphacae (Lall, H.S.Gill & Munjal) U.Braun & Crous
- Passalora latispora (Petr.) U.Braun & Crous
- Passalora laurina (Speg.) R.Kirschner
- Passalora laxa (Kalchbr. & Cooke) U.Braun & Crous
- Passalora leeae (Chidd.) U.Braun & Crous
- Passalora legrellei (V.G.Rao & B.R.D.Yadav) Kamal
- Passalora leonotidis (Cooke) U.Braun & Crous
- Passalora lepistemonis L.Xia
- Passalora leprosa (Speg.) U.Braun
- Passalora leptadeniae (Chidd.) U.Braun & Crous
- Passalora lettsomiae (Thirum. & Chupp) Crous & U.Braun
- Passalora leucaenae (Raghu Ram & Mallaiah) Kamal
- Passalora liabi (Syd. & P.Syd.) U.Braun & Crous
- Passalora ligustricola Y.L.Guo
- Passalora liriodendri (Ellis & Harkn.) U.Braun & Crous
- Passalora litseae (Goh & W.H.Hsieh) Poonam Srivast.
- Passalora lobeliae-cardinalis (Schwein.) U.Braun & Crous
- Passalora lobeliae-fistulosae J.L.Alves & R.W. Barreto
- Passalora lomaensis (Deighton) U.Braun & Crous
- Passalora lonicerigena Y.L.Guo
- Passalora loranthincola (Petr.) U.Braun
- Passalora lueheae (Chupp & Viégas) U.Braun & Crous
- Passalora lycopersici (M.A.Salam & P.N.Rao) Kamal
- Passalora lygodii (Sawada ex Goh & W.H.Hsieh) R.Kirschner
- Passalora macarangae S.K.Singh, P.N.Singh & P.Mishra
- Passalora macfadyenae Meir.Silva, O.L.Pereira & R.W.Barreto
- Passalora machaerii A.Hern.-Gut. & Dianese
- Passalora macroguttata (G.F.Atk.) U.Braun & Crous
- Passalora maculicola (Ellis & Kellerm.) U.Braun
- Passalora magnoliae (Ellis & Harkn.) U.Braun & Crous
- Passalora majewskii U.Braun & F.O.Freire
- Passalora malkoffii (Bubák) U.Braun
- Passalora malpighiae (U.Braun & Mouch.) U.Braun & Crous
- Passalora malpighiae-glabrae U.Braun & Crous
- Passalora malvacearum (B.Rai & Kamal) U.Braun & Crous
- Passalora manaosensis (Henn.) U.Braun & Crous
- Passalora manihotis (F.Stevens & Solheim) U.Braun & Crous
- Passalora manitobana (Davis) U.Braun & Crous
- Passalora maritima (Tracy & Earle) U.Braun & Crous
- Passalora markhamiae (X.J.Liu & Y.L.Guo) U.Braun & Crous
- Passalora marmorata (Tranzschel) U.Braun & Crous
- Passalora marsdeniicola U.Braun & F.O.Freire
- Passalora medicaginis-lupulinae (Munjal, Lall & Chona) Kamal
- Passalora melanochaeta (Ellis & Everh.) U.Braun
- Passalora melochiae U.Braun & Urtiaga
- Passalora menispermi (Ellis & Holw.) U.Braun & Crous
- Passalora meridiana (Chupp) U.Braun & Crous
- Passalora merremiae (X.J.Liu & Y.L.Guo) U.Braun & Crous
- Passalora merrowii (Ellis & Everh.) U.Braun
- Passalora mertensiae U.Braun & Rogerson
- Passalora mikaniae (F.Stevens) U.Braun & F.O.Freire
- Passalora mikaniigena U.Braun & Crous
- Passalora miliusae U.Braun & Crous
- Passalora mimosae (F.Stevens & Dalbey) U.Braun
- Passalora mimosigena U.Braun & F.O.Freire
- Passalora minutissima (Desm.) U.Braun & Crous
- Passalora mitracarpi-hirti O.L.Pereira & R.W.Barreto
- Passalora mitragynae (P.Kumar & Kamal) Kamal
- Passalora miurae (Syd. & P.Syd.) U.Braun & H.D.Shin
- Passalora momordicae (Heald & F.A. Wolf) U.Braun & Crous
- Passalora monninae U.Braun & Crous
- Passalora monrosii (Munt.Cvetk.) U.Braun & Crous
- Passalora montana (Speg.) U.Braun & Crous
- Passalora morrisii Crous
- Passalora mucunae (Syd. & P.Syd.) U.Braun & Mouch.
- Passalora mucunicola Crous, U.Braun & Alfenas
- Passalora munduleae (Sacc., Syd. & P.Syd.) U.Braun & Crous
- Passalora murina (Ellis & Kellerm.) U.Braun & Crous
- Passalora musicola Sham. Kumar & R.Singh
- Passalora myracrodruonis (Inácio & Dianese) U.Braun & Crous
- Passalora myricae Meeboon, Hidayat & C.Nakash.
- Passalora nattrassii (Deighton) U.Braun & Crous
- Passalora neonepalensis U.Braun & Crous
- Passalora nepalensis Adhikari & V.Manandhar
- Passalora neriiindici- (Bhalla, S.K.Singh & A.K.Srivast.) U.Braun & Crous
- Passalora nervisequens (J.Kranz) U.Braun & Crous
- Passalora nopomingensis (B.Sutton) U.Braun & Crous
- Passalora noveboracensis (Ellis & Everh.) U.Braun & Crous
- Passalora obesa (Ellis & Everh.) U.Braun
- Passalora occidentalis (Cooke) U.Braun
- Passalora oculata (Ellis & Kellerm.) U.Braun & Crous
- Passalora oenotherae U.Braun
- Passalora okinawaensis (Tak.Kobay. & Nishij.) U.Braun & Crous
- Passalora oldenlandiae (Hansf.) U.Braun & Crous
- Passalora oleacearum (Chidd.) U.Braun
- Passalora oleariae (B.Sutton & Pascoe) U.Braun & Crous
- Passalora omphacodes (Ellis & Holw.) Crous & U.Braun
- Passalora ougeiniae (M.D. Mehrotra & R.K. Verma) U.Braun & Crous
- Passalora pachycarpi (Chupp & Doidge) Crous & U.Braun
- Passalora pachypus (Ellis & Kellerm.) U.Braun
- Passalora pallidissima (Chupp) U.Braun
- Passalora papaveris (F.Y. Zhai, Y.L.Guo & Yu Li) F.Y.Zhai, Y.L.Guo & Yu Li
- Passalora papayae (Y.L.Guo) Y.L.Guo
- Passalora paradoxa (Munt.Cvetk.) U.Braun & Crous
- Passalora paspalicola (Petr. & Cif.) U.Braun
- Passalora pastinacae (Sacc.) U.Braun
- Passalora paulowniicola (J.M.Yen & S.K.Sun) U.Braun & Crous
- Passalora pavoniicola U.Braun & F.O.Freire
- Passalora peixotoae (Chupp & Viégas) U.Braun & Crous
- Passalora peixotoaegoianae A.Hern.Gut. & Dianese
- Passalora peixotoaereticulatae A.Hern.Gut. & Dianese
- Passalora peltophori S.K.Singh, P.N.Singh & P.Mishra
- Passalora penicillata Ces.
- Passalora pergulariae (Dublish & P.N.Singh) U.Braun & Crous
- Passalora periclymeni (G. Winter) U.Braun & Crous
- Passalora perideridiae U.Braun & Crous
- Passalora pfaffiae (Chupp) U.Braun & Crous
- Passalora phalaridis K.Schub. & U.Braun
- Passalora phellodendricola (F.X.Chao & P.K.Chi) U.Braun & Crous
- Passalora philadelphi (Y.L.Guo) U.Braun & Crous
- Passalora pilophila (Jacz. ex Vassiljevsky & Karak.) U.Braun & Crous
- Passalora pilosae (T.S.Ramakr.) U.Braun & Crous
- Passalora piperis (Henn.) U.Braun & Crous
- Passalora pirozynskii (Deighton) U.Braun & Crous
- Passalora pithecellobii (J.L.Mulder) U.Braun & Crous
- Passalora pithoragarhensis U.Braun & Crous
- Passalora platensis (Speg.) U.Braun & Crous
- Passalora platyspora (Ellis & Holw.) U.Braun
- Passalora plectranthicola (Chidd.) U.Braun & Crous
- Passalora plucheae (Petr. & Cif.) U.Braun & Crous
- Passalora poasensis (Syd.) U.Braun & Crous
- Passalora podophylli (Tehon & E.Y. Daniels) U.Braun & Crous
- Passalora polygalae U.Braun & F.O.Freire
- Passalora polygonati (Rostr.) U.Braun & Crous
- Passalora polygonatimaximowiczii Poonam Srivast.
- Passalora polygoni Y.L.Guo
- Passalora pongamiicola U.Braun & Crous
- Passalora prenanthis (Ellis & Kellerm.) U.Braun & Crous
- Passalora pruni (Y.L.Guo & X.J.Liu) U.Braun & Crous
- Passalora pseudocapnioides O.L.Pereira & R.W. Barreto
- Passalora psidii Bat. & R.Garnier
- Passalora psidiicola Crous & U.Braun
- Passalora pteleae (G. Winter) U.Braun
- Passalora pteridis (Siemaszko) U.Braun & Crous
- Passalora puerariae (D.E. Shaw & Deighton) U.Braun & Crous
- Passalora puerariigena Y.L.Guo
- Passalora pulchella (T.S.Ramakr.) U.Braun & Crous
- Passalora pumila (Syd. & P.Syd.) U.Braun & Crous
- Passalora punctum (Delacr.) Arx
- Passalora pyricola (S.K.Singh & R.K.Chaudhary) U.Braun & Crous
- Passalora pyrigena (S.K.Singh & R.K.Chaudhary) U.Braun & Crous
- Passalora pyrophila U.Braun & Crous
- Passalora pyrostegiae (Viégas) U.Braun & Crous
- Passalora pyrrosiae (Togashi & Katsuki) C.Nakash. & I. Araki
- Passalora qualeae Dorn.Silva & Dianese
- Passalora quercus (Chupp) Crous & U.Braun
- Passalora rajakii (Kamal & S.K.Majumdar) Kamal
- Passalora ramularioides (Sacc. & Fautrey) U.Braun
- Passalora rauvolfiae (Deighton) U.Braun & Crous
- Passalora raveneliae (M.D.Mehrotra & R.K.Verma) U.Braun & Crous
- Passalora rhamnacearum (S.Shrivast., N.Verma & A.N.Rai) Raghv.Singh & Sham. Kumar
- Passalora rhoina U.Braun & Crous
- Passalora rhois (E.Castell.) U.Braun & Crous
- Passalora rhoisaromaticae U.Braun
- Passalora ribisrubri- (Săvul. & Sandu) U.Braun
- Passalora rolliniae Firmino & O.L.Pereira
- Passalora rosae (Fuckel) U.Braun
- Passalora rosigena U.Braun & Crous
- Passalora rottboelliae (J.Kranz) U.Braun & Crous
- Passalora rubella (Cooke) U.Braun & Crous
- Passalora rubida Crous, Alfenas & R.W.Barreto
- Passalora rufidula (Petr.) U.Braun & Crous
- Passalora salicis (Deighton, R.A.B.Verma & S.S.Prasad) U.Braun & Crous
- Passalora saniculae (Davis) U.Braun & Crous
- Passalora sauropodis (P.K.Chi & S.Q.Chen) Y.L.Guo
- Passalora saururi (Ellis & Everh.) Crous & U.Braun
- Passalora sawadae (S.C.Jong & E.F.Morris) U.Braun & Crous
- Passalora scandicearum (Magnus) U.Braun & Crous
- Passalora schefflerae A.Hern.Gut. & Dianese
- Passalora schisandrae (Y.L.Guo) U.Braun & Crous
- Passalora securidacae U.Braun & Crous
- Passalora selinigmelini- (Sacc. & Scalia) U.Braun
- Passalora senecionicola U.Braun & Delhey
- Passalora sequoiae (Ellis & Everh.) Y.L.Guo & W.H.Hsieh
- Passalora serpentariae (Ellis & Everh.) U.Braun & Crous
- Passalora sesbaniae U.Braun & Crous
- Passalora sidaecordifoliae Crous, U.Braun & Alfenas
- Passalora sidaemysorensis Meeboon & Hidayat
- Passalora sidarum (Petr. & Cif.) U.Braun & Crous
- Passalora sidigena U.Braun & Urtiaga
- Passalora sii (Ellis & Everh.) U.Braun
- Passalora simulans (Ellis & Kellerm.) U.Braun
- Passalora simulata (Ellis & Everh.) U.Braun
- Passalora solanacearum (Bhalla, S.K.Singh & A.K.Srivast.) U.Braun & Crous
- Passalora solani (Seaver) U.Braun
- Passalora solanitorvi- (Gonz. Frag. & Cif.) U.Braun & Crous
- Passalora solaniverbascifolii Y.L.Guo
- Passalora solaniphila U.Braun & Urtiaga
- Passalora spegazzinii U.Braun
- Passalora squalidula (Peck) U.Braun
- Passalora stemodiae (Syd.) U.Braun & Crous
- Passalora stephaniae Goh & W.H.Hsieh
- Passalora sterculiacearum U.Braun & Crous
- Passalora stigmaphylli (R.E.D.Baker & W.T.Dale) U.Braun & Crous
- Passalora stigmaphyllicola U.Braun & Urtiaga
- Passalora streptopi (Dearn. & Barthol.) U.Braun
- Passalora stromatica A.F.Fern. & R.W.Barreto
- Passalora stylosanthis (Speg.) U.Braun
- Passalora styracis (Chupp) U.Braun & Crous
- Passalora subhyalina (S.K.Singh & P.N.Singh) Kamal
- Passalora sublateritia (Henn.) U.Braun & Crous
- Passalora sudanensis (Deighton) U.Braun & Crous
- Passalora sweetiae K.Schub. & U.Braun
- Passalora symphoricarpi (Ellis & Everh.) U.Braun & Crous
- Passalora syzygii (M.Mandal) B.Sutton & Crous
- Passalora tabebuiae (J.J.Muchovej & F.A.Ferreira) U.Braun & Crous
- Passalora tabebuiaeochraceae Inácio & Dianese
- Passalora taihokuensis (Sawada ex Goh & W.H.Hsieh) Y.L.Guo & W.H.Hsieh
- Passalora tamala P.Srivast., S.Narayan & Meenu
- Passalora tarrii (Deighton) U.Braun & Crous
- Passalora tecomariae Crous & B.Sutton
- Passalora telaria (Munt.Cvetk.) U.Braun & Crous
- Passalora tephrosiae S.A.Khan & M.Kamal
- Passalora tephrosiaepurpureae U.Braun
- Passalora tephrosiicola (S.K.Singh, Bhalla & Kamal) U.Braun & Crous
- Passalora terrestris (K.J.Srivast. & P.C.Misra) Poonam Srivast.
- Passalora teucrii (Schwein.) U.Braun & Crous
- Passalora thalictri (Thüm.) U.Braun
- Passalora thalictrina (Karak.) U.Braun & Melnik
- Passalora tibouchinae Parreira & O.L.Pereira
- Passalora tiliae (Y.L.Guo & X.J.Liu) U.Braun & Crous
- Passalora tinosporae (A.K.Kar & J.B.Ray) Poonam Srivast.
- Passalora tithoniae (R.E.D.Baker & W.T.Dale) U.Braun & Crous
- Passalora togashiana (Katsuki & Urasawa) C.Nakash.
- Passalora tomentosae (Hansf.) U.Braun & Crous
- Passalora tranzschelii (Vassiljevsky) U.Braun & Crous
- Passalora trematis (F.Stevens & Solheim) U.Braun & Crous
- Passalora trichophila Raghv.Singh
- Passalora trichostemmatis (Henn.) U.Braun & Crous
- Passalora trifidae (Chupp) U.Braun & Crous
- Passalora trigonellae (S.K.Singh, Arch. Singh & Kamal) U.Braun & Crous
- Passalora triostei (Chupp & H.C.Greene) U.Braun & Crous
- Passalora triseptispora (J.M.Yen) U.Braun & Crous
- Passalora triumfettae (Deighton) U.Braun & Crous
- Passalora tungurahuensis (Petr.) U.Braun & Crous
- Passalora turbinae (Chupp) U.Braun & Crous
- Passalora tylophorae (Hansf.) U.Braun & Crous
- Passalora ubatubensis (Chupp & Viégas) Crous, Alfenas & R.W.Barreto
- Passalora umbrata (Ellis & Holw.) U.Braun
- Passalora urostigmatis (Henn.) Crous & M.P.S.Câmara
- Passalora uttarkashiensis (Kamal, B.K.Gupta & C.Gupta) U.Braun & Crous
- Passalora vaginae (W.Krüger) U.Braun & Crous
- Passalora valerianae (U.Braun) U.Braun
- Passalora valerianicola (H.D.Shin & U.Braun) U.Braun & Crous
- Passalora vanderystii (Henn.) U.Braun & Crous
- Passalora venturioides (Peck) U.Braun & Crous
- Passalora verbeniphila (Speg.) Crous & U.Braun
- Passalora verbesinae (Munt.Cvetk.) U.Braun & Crous
- Passalora verniciae Crous, U.Braun & Alfenas
- Passalora vexans (C.Massal.) U.Braun & Crous
- Passalora viburni (Ellis & Everh.) U.Braun & Crous
- Passalora viburnisargentii Y.L.Guo
- Passalora vicosae Crous, Alfenas & R.W. Barreto ex Crous & U.Braun
- Passalora vincetoxicihirsuti U.Braun & Crous
- Passalora vitis (M.S.Patil & Sawant) Poonam Srivast.
- Passalora vitispiadezkii U.Braun & Crous
- Passalora vitisripariae- (U.Braun) U.Braun & Crous
- Passalora voandzeiae (Bouriquet) U.Braun & Crous
- Passalora wangii (F.Y.Zhai, Y.L.Guo & Yu Li) F.Y.Zhai, Y.L.Guo & Yu Li
- Passalora weigelae (Y.L.Guo & X.J.Liu) U.Braun & Crous
- Passalora weigelicola (U.Braun & H.D.Shin) U.Braun & Crous
- Passalora winteriana U.Braun
- Passalora xenogrewiae (S.K.Singh & P.N.Singh) Kamal
- Passalora xylopiae (Viégas & Chupp) U.Braun & Crous
- Passalora yuccaegloriosae Crous, U.Braun & Alfenas
- Passalora zanthoxyli (Y.L.Guo & Z.M.Cao) U.Braun & Crous
- Passalora ziziae (Ellis & Everh.) U.Braun & Crous
- Passalora ziziphi (S.S.Prasad & R.A.B.Verma) U.Braun & Crous
- Passalora ziziphicola U.Braun & Crous
