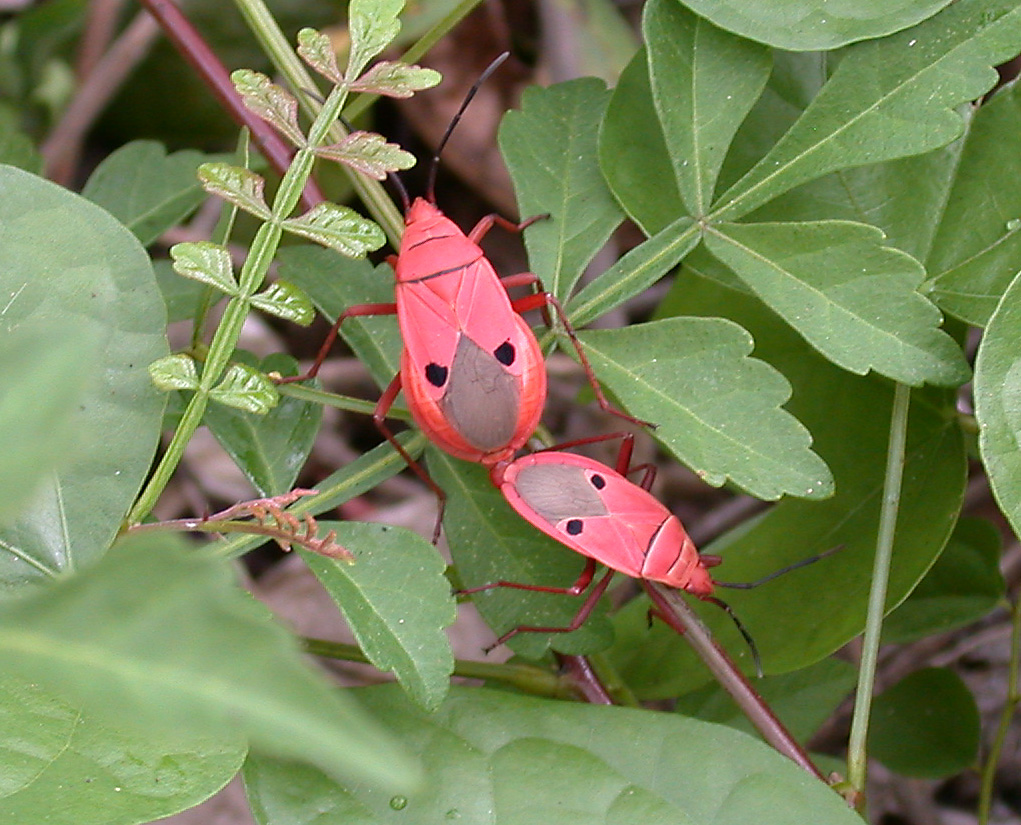

Scientific classification
- Kingdom: Animalia
- Phylum: Arthropoda
- Class: Insecta
- Order: Hemiptera
- Suborder: Heteroptera
- Family: Pyrrhocoridae
- Genus: Probergrothius
- Species: P. nigricornis

Binomial name
- Probergrothius nigricornis (Stal, 1861)

Synonyms
- Odontopus nigricornis Physopelta plana Physopelta bimaculata

= Probergrothius nigricornis =

Species of insect

Probergrothius nigricornis is a species of bug found in tropical Asia. They feed primarily on the seeds of Malvales.

The antennae are all black, the first and second segments nearly equal and the third is the shortest. The fore femora are serrate on the underside. P. sanguinolens which overlaps in distribution has the terminal antennal segment pale and the second segment longer than the first.

== Gallery ==
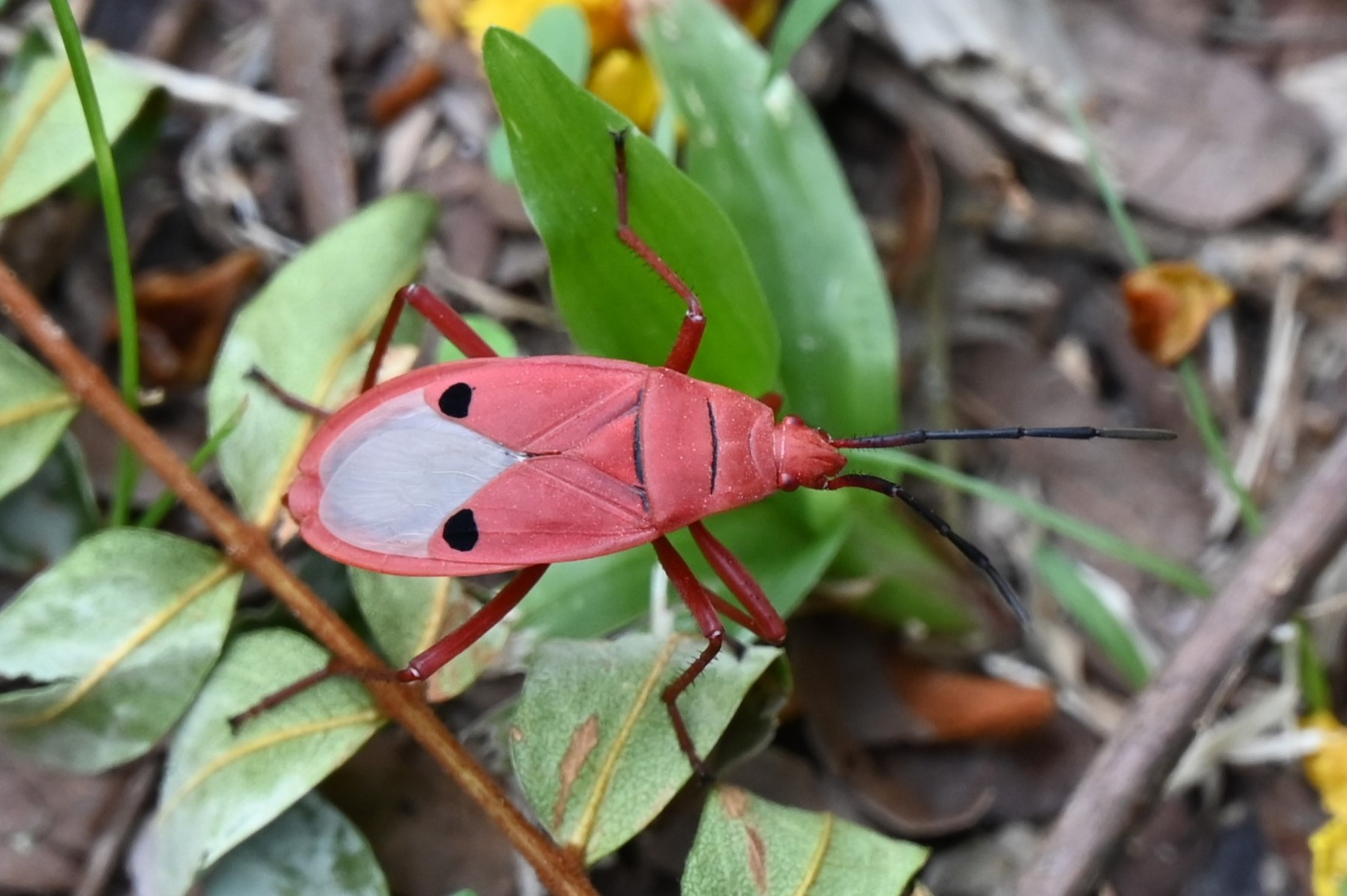
An adult Probergrothius nigricornis in Chiang Mai, Thailand

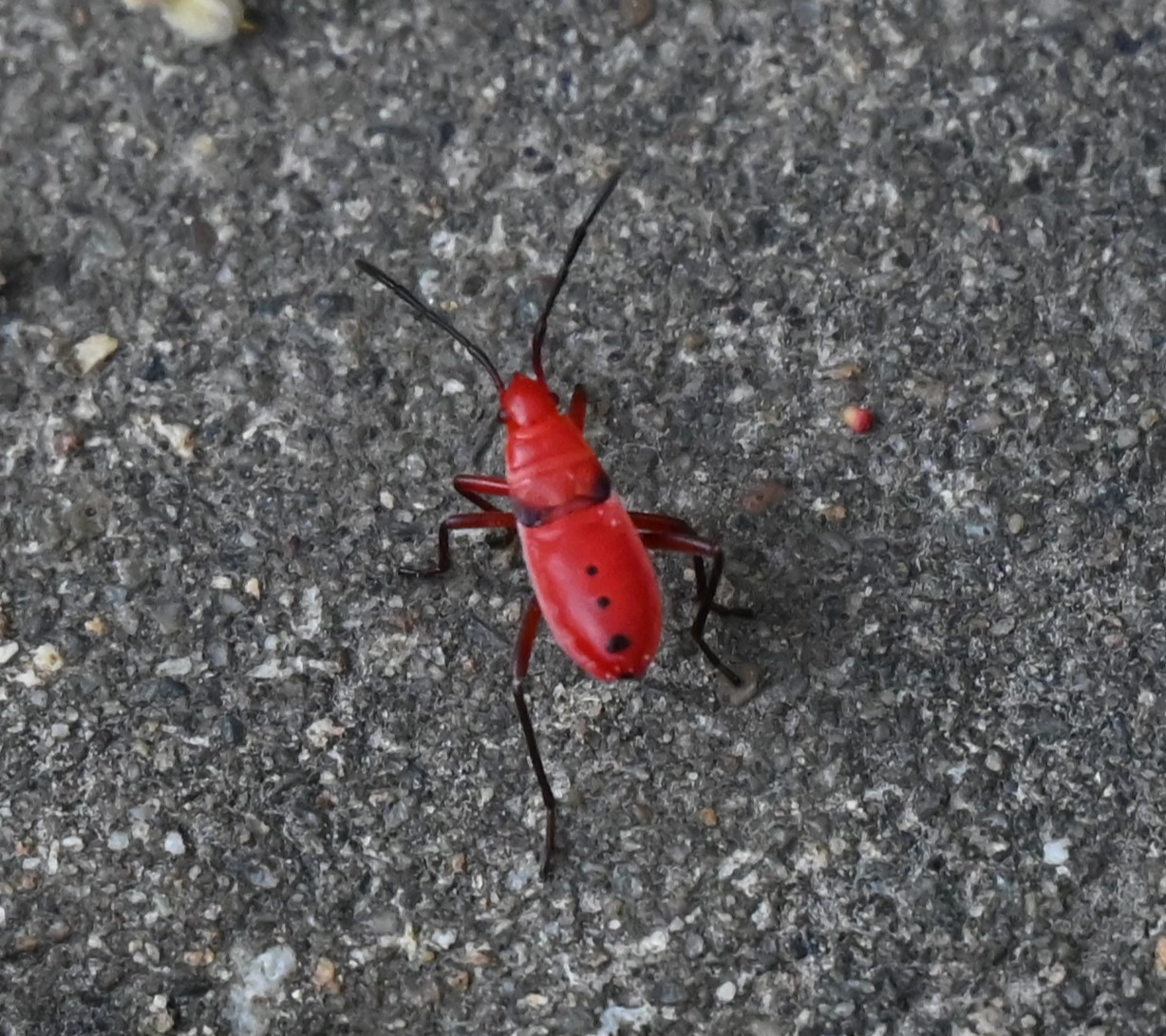
A Probergrothius nigricornis nymph in Chiang Mai, Thailand.
