= Passalora bataticola =

Scientific classification
- Kingdom: Fungi
- Division: Ascomycota
- Class: Dothideomycetes
- Order: Mycosphaerellales
- Family: Mycosphaerellaceae
- Genus: Passalora
- Species: P. bataticola

Binomial name
- Passalora bataticola (Cif. & Bruner) U. Braun & Crous

Synonyms
- Cercospora batatas Zimm. [as 'batatae'], (1904); Cercospora bataticola Cif. & Bruner, (1931); Cercospora ipomoeae G. Winter, (1887); Phaeoisariopsis bataticola (Cif. & Bruner) M.B. Ellis, (1976)

Species of fungus

Passalora bataticola is a fungal plant pathogen infecting sweet potatoes and water spinach.
