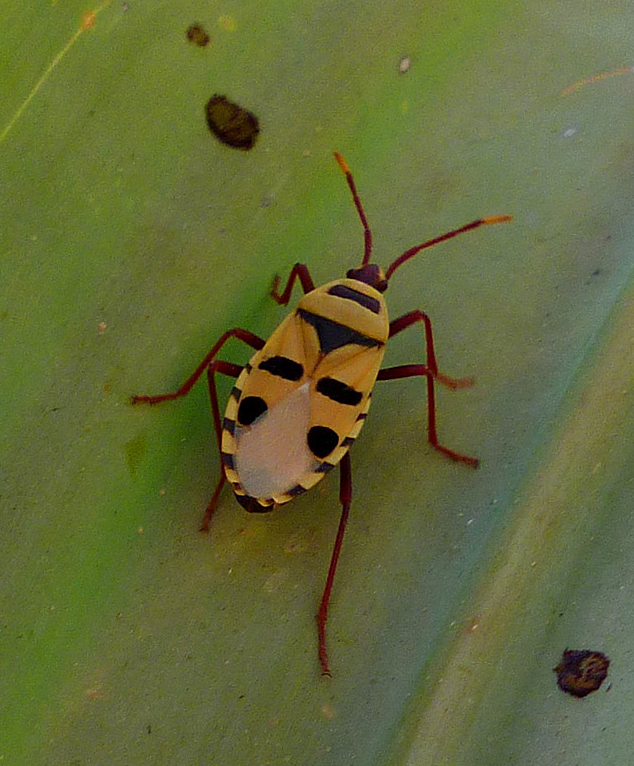
- Probergrothius angolensis, Namibia

Scientific classification
- Domain: Eukaryota
- Kingdom: Animalia
- Phylum: Arthropoda
- Class: Insecta
- Order: Hemiptera
- Suborder: Heteroptera
- Family: Pyrrhocoridae
- Genus: Probergrothius; Kirkaldy, 1904

Synonyms
- Odontopus Laporte, 1832

= Probergrothius =

Genus of true bugs

Probergrothius is an Old World genus of true bugs in the family Pyrrhocoridae. The genus was previously referred to as Odontopus, but that name was already in use for a genus of weevils, and was therefore replaced by Probergrothius in 1904. Members of this genus are reported to feed mainly on members of the plant order Malvales, including Sterculia, baobab (Adansonia), and kapok (Ceiba or Bombax), but will feed on others as well. The welwitschia bug, Probergrothius angolensis, feeds on Welwitschia seeds, which is a gymnosperm, unlike the Malvales, which are angiosperms.

== Species ==
- Probergrothius angolensis (Distant)
- Probergrothius confusus (Distant)
- Probergrothius dilectus (Walker)
- Probergrothius exsanguis (Gerstäcker)
- Probergrothius modestus (Distant)
- Probergrothius nigricornis (Stål)
- Probergrothius notabilis (Distant)
- Probergrothius obscurellus (Blöte)
- Probergrothius sanguinolens (Amyot & Serville)
- Probergrothius satyrus (Bergroth)
- Probergrothius scutellaris (Walker)
- Probergrothius sexpunctatus (Laporte)
- Probergrothius somaliensis (Goursat)
- Probergrothius varicornis (Fabricius)
- Probergrothius zoraida (Kirkaldy & Edwards)
