= Phaeoramularia indica =

Scientific classification
- Domain: Eukaryota
- Kingdom: Fungi
- Division: Ascomycota
- Class: Dothideomycetes
- Order: Capnodiales
- Family: Mycosphaerellaceae
- Genus: Phaeoramularia
- Species: P. indica

Binomial name
- Phaeoramularia indica S.K. Singh, R.K. Chaudhary & Meenu

Species of fungus

Phaeoramularia indica is a species of sac fungus. The fungus was found to cause leaf spots in north-eastern Uttar Pradesh.
