= Phaeoramularia =

Scientific classification
- Domain: Eukaryota
- Kingdom: Fungi
- Division: Ascomycota
- Class: Dothideomycetes
- Order: Capnodiales
- Family: Mycosphaerellaceae
- Genus: Phaeoramularia; Munt.-Cvetk. (1960)

Type species
- Phaeoramularia gomphrenicola (Speg.) Munt.-Cvetk. (1960)

Synonyms
- Passalora sect. Phaeoramularia (Munt.-Cvetk.) A.Hernández-Gutiérrez & Dianese (2009)

Genus of fungi

Phaeoramularia is a genus of fungi in the family Mycosphaerellaceae. It was circumscribed in 1960.

Etymology: probably from Greek φαιος -dusky (colour)- & Latin ramus, ramulus &c. -branch.

== Species ==
As accepted by Species Fungorum;

- Phaeoramularia adenocalymmatis (A.S. Mull. & Chupp) Crous & M.P.S. Câmara (1998)
- Phaeoramularia alabamensis (G.F. Atk.) C.E. García & N. Pons (1997)
- Phaeoramularia aristolochiana S.K. Majumdar, S. Singh ter & Anuradha (2004)
- Phaeoramularia asclepiadacearum Gadp., D.K. Dwivedi & A.N. Rai (1998)
- Phaeoramularia asiatica A.N. Rai & Kamal (1988)
- Phaeoramularia buchananiana S.K. Majumdar, S. Singh ter & Anuradha (2004)
- Phaeoramularia caesalpiniacearum Gadp., D.K. Dwivedi & A.N. Rai (1998)
- Phaeoramularia calotropidicola S.K. Singh & R.K. Chaudhary (1996)
- Phaeoramularia cylindrica R.K. Chaudhary, Tripathi, P.N. Singh & Kamal (1998)
- Phaeoramularia erigeronis R.K. Chaudhary, S.K. Singh & P.N. Singh (2002)
- Phaeoramularia eupatorii-odorati (J.M. Yen) X.J. Liu & Y.L. Guo (1982)
- Phaeoramularia graminicola Mukerji & M. Khanna (1983)
- Phaeoramularia imperatae R.K. Chaudhary, Tripathi, P.N. Singh & Kamal (1998)
- Phaeoramularia indica S.K. Singh, R.K. Chaudhary & Meenu (1997)
- Phaeoramularia isotomae Deighton (1986)
- Phaeoramularia levieri (Magnus) U. Braun (1997)
- Phaeoramularia macrospora R.K. Chaudhary, Tripathi, P.N. Singh & Kamal (1998)
- Phaeoramularia maculicola (Romell & Sacc.) B. Sutton (1970)
- Phaeoramularia marsdeniae S.K. Singh, Bhalla & Kamal (2003)
- Phaeoramularia microspora R.K. Chaudhary, Tripathi, P.N. Singh & Kamal (1998)
- Phaeoramularia moracearum S.K. Singh, R.K. Chaudhary & Meenu (1997)
- Phaeoramularia psidii-guajavae S.K. Singh, R.K. Chaudhary & Meenu (1997)
- Phaeoramularia punctiformis (Schltdl.) U. Braun (1992)
- Phaeoramularia rosigena R.K. Chaudhary, S.K. Singh & P.N. Singh (2002)
- Phaeoramularia spiraeae R.K. Chaudhary, Tripathi, P.N. Singh & Kamal (1998)
- Phaeoramularia verbenacearum Gadp., D.K. Dwivedi & A.N. Rai (1998)

Former species (all within the Mycosphaerellaceae family apart from one);

- P. acanthicola (Hansf.) Deighton (1987) = Passalora acanthicola
- P. acericola X.J. Liu & Y.L. Guo (1982) = Passalora acericola
- P. actaeae (Ellis & Holw.) U. Braun (1993) = Passalora actaeae
- P. adenostemmatis R.K. Verma & Kamal (1989) = Passalora adenostemmatis
- P. ahmadii (Petr.) U. Braun (1995) = Passalora ahmadii
- P. ajrekarii (Syd. & P. Syd.) Deighton (1976) = Passalora ajrekarii
- P. angolensis (T. Carvalho & O. Mendes) P.M. Kirk (1986) = Pseudocercospora angolensis
- P. antigoni (M.L. Farr) Deighton (1979) = Passalora antigoni
- P. antipus (Ellis & Holw.) Deighton (1976) = Passalora antipus
- P. barringtoniae (Syd. & P. Syd.) X.J. Liu & Y.L. Guo (1982) = Cercospora barringtoniae
- P. barringtoniicola Y.L. Guo (2002) = Passalora barringtoniicola
- P. bauhiniae S.K. Singh, Bhalla & Kamal (1999) = Passalora bauhiniigena
- P. braunii S.K. Singh, Arch. Singh & Kamal (1997) = Passalora braunii
- P. bruchiana (Speg.) Deighton (1976) = Passalora bruchiana
- P. buteae Kamal, B.K. Gupta & C. Gupta (1990) = Passalora buteae
- P. caesalpiniae Bhalla, A.K. Sarbhoy, M. Kulshr. & K.P.S. Kushwaha (2001) = Passalora caesalpiniae
- P. calotropidis (Ellis & Everh.) Kamal, A.S. Moses & R. Chaudhary (1990) = Clypeosphaerella calotropidis
- P. capsicicola (Vassiljevsky) Deighton (1976) = Passalora capsicicola
- P. catenospora (G.F. Atk.) Deighton (1976) = Passalora catenospora
- P. cephalanthi (Ellis & Kellerm.) U. Braun (1998) = Passalora cephalanthi
- P. chuppii (Viégas) Inácio & Dianese (1996) = Passalora chuppii
- P. ciccaronei N. Pons (1993) = Cercospora sorghi
- P. cimicifugae F.Y. Zhai, Y.L. Guo & Yu Li (2009) = Passalora cimicifugae
- P. clematidis S.K. Singh & R.K. Chaudhary (1995) = Passalora clematidis-gourianae
- P. coalescens (Davis) U. Braun & Rogerson (1993) = Passalora coalescens
- P. collomiae U. Braun & Rogerson (1993) = Passalora collomiae
- P. cordiae P. Kumar & Kamal (1980) = Passalora cordiae
- P. crotonis (Ellis & Everh.) Crous, U. Braun & Alfenas (1999) = Passalora crotonis
- P. crotonis-oligandri (J.M. Yen & Gilles) Crous, U. Braun & Alfenas (1999) = Passalora crotonis-oligandri
- P. cucurbiticola (Henn.) Deighton (1976) = Passalora cucurbiticola
- P. cyperi D. Gupta, Padhi & Chowdhry (1981) = Passalora cyperi
- P. delphinii F.Y. Zhai, Y.L. Guo & Yu Li (2007) = Passalora delphinii
- P. destruens F. Anderson, Delhey & U. Braun (1998) = Passalora destruens
- P. dichanthii-annulati R.K. Chaudhary, S.K. Singh & P.N. Singh (2002) = Passalora dichanthii-annulati
- P. digitariae Crous & B. Sutton (1997) = Passalora digitariae
- P. dioscoreae (Ellis & G. Martin) Deighton (1976) = Distocercosporaster dioscoreae
- P. dissiliens (Duby) Deighton (1976) = Passalora dissiliens
- P. eucalyptorum Crous (1998) = Passalora eucalyptorum
- P. eupatorii A.K. Das (1991) = Passalora eupatorii
- P. euphorbiae Q.X. Ge, X.J. Liu, T. Xu & Y.L. Guo (1982) = Passalora euphorbiicola
- P. ficina S.K. Singh & R.K. Chaudhary (1996) = Passalora ficina
- P. fusimaculans (G.F. Atk.) X.J. Liu & Y.L. Guo (1982) = Catenulocercospora fusimaculans
- P. gayophyti (Ellis & Everh.) Deighton (1976) = Passalora gayophyti
- P. geranii (W.B. Cooke & C.G. Shaw) U. Braun (1993) = Pseudophaeoramularia geranii
- P. gibertii (Speg.) U. Braun (1999) = Passalora gibertii
- P. goaensis S.K. Singh, Dhanorkar & Waing. (2004) = Passalora goaensis
- P. gomphrenicola (Speg.) Munt.-Cvetk. (1960) = Passalora gomphrenicola
- P. grewiae Y.L. Guo & Li Xu (2002) = Passalora grewiigena
- P. hachijoensis Matsush. (1975) = Tyrannosorus hystrioides, Dothideomycetes
- P. helianthi X.J. Liu & Y.L. Guo (1982) = Passalora helianthicola
- P. heliotropii (Ellis & Everh.) N. Pons & B. Sutton (1996) = Passalora heliotropii
- P. heterospora (Ellis & Galloway) Deighton (1976) = Passalora heterosporella
- P. hoehnelii Petzoldt (1992) = Passalora heterospora
- P. hyptidigena Kamal, A.S. Moses & R. Chaudhary (1990) = Passalora hyptidigena
- P. iresines Munt.-Cvetk. (1960) = Passalora iresines
- P. isolonae Siboe, P.M. Kirk & P.F. Cannon (2000) = Passalora isolonae
- P. kellermaniana Marasas & I.H. Bredell (1974) = Chalastospora gossypii
- P. leeae (Chidd.) Deighton (1976) = Passalora leeae
- P. legrellei V.G. Rao & B.R.D. Yadav (1991) = Passalora legrellei
- P. leptadeniae (Chidd.) Deighton (1976) = Passalora leptadeniae
- P. lomaensis Deighton (1979) = Passalora lomaensis
- P. malpighiae U. Braun & Mouch. (1999) = Passalora malpighiae
- P. manihotis (F. Stevens & Solheim) M.B. Ellis (1976) = Passalora manihotis
- P. maritima (Tracy & Earle) Crous, U. Braun & Alfenas (1999) = Passalora maritima
- P. markhamiae X.J. Liu & Y.L. Guo (1982) = Passalora markhamiae
- P. marmorata (Tranzschel) Deighton (1976) = Passalora marmorata
- P. meridiana (Chupp) Deighton (1979) = Passalora meridiana
- P. minutissima (Desm.) U. Braun (1992) = Passalora minutissima
- P. momordicae (Heald & F.A. Wolf) U. Braun (1993) = Passalora momordicae
- P. montana (Speg.) Y.L. Guo & X.J. Liu (1989) = Passalora montana
- P. nepalensis S.K. Singh & R.K. Chaudhary (1995) = Passalora neonepalensis
- P. occidentalis (Cooke) Deighton (1976) = Passalora occidentalis
- P. oculata (Ellis & Kellerm.) U. Braun (1999) = Passalora oculata
- P. oldenlandiae (Hansf.) Deighton (1976) = Passalora oldenlandiae
- P. ougeiniae M.D. Mehrotra & R.K. Verma (1991) = Passalora ougeiniae
- P. pachirae Chupp & A.S. Mull. ex J.J. Muchovej & F.A. Ferreira (1991) = Pseudocercospora pachirae
- P. papaveris F.Y. Zhai, Y.L. Guo & Yu Li (2006) = Passalora papaveris
- P. parodaxa Munt.-Cvetk. (1960) = Passalora paradoxa
- P. penicillata (Ces.) X.J. Liu & Y.L. Guo (1982) = Passalora penicillata
- P. pergulariae Dublish & P.N. Singh (1977) = Passalora pergulariae
- P. periclymeni (G. Winter) Deighton (1979) = Passalora periclymeni
- P. platensis (Speg.) Deighton (1976) = Passalora platensis
- P. plucheae (Petr. & Cif.) Deighton (1976) = Passalora plucheae
- P. pruni Y.L. Guo & X.J. Liu (1987) = Passalora pruni
- P. pyricola S.K. Singh & R.K. Chaudhary (1995) = Passalora pyricola
- P. pyrigena S.K. Singh & R.K. Chaudhary (1996) = Passalora pyrigena
- P. pyrostegiae (Viégas) Inácio & Dianese (1996) = Passalora pyrostegiae
- P. rauvolfiae Deighton (1979) = Passalora rauvolfiae
- P. rhamnacearum S. Shrivast., N. Verma & A.N. Rai (2009) = Passalora rhamnacearum
- P. rhois (E. Castell.) Deighton (1976) = Passalora rhois
- P. saururi (Ellis & Everh.) Crous & El-Gholl (1999) = Passalora saururi
- P. scandicearum (Magnus) U. Braun (1993) = Passalora scandicearum
- P. schisandrae Y.L. Guo (1993) = Passalora schisandrae
- P. sudanensis Deighton (1979) = Passalora sudanensis
- P. symphoricarpi (Ellis & Everh.) Deighton (1976) = Passalora symphoricarpi
- P. tabebuiae J.J. Muchovej & F.A. Ferreira (1981) = Passalora tabebuiae
- P. tephrosiicola S.K. Singh, Bhalla & Kamal (1999) = Passalora tephrosiicola
- P. tinosporae Kamal, A.S. Moses & R. Chaudhary (1990) = Pseudocercospora tinosporigena
- P. tithoniae (R.E.D. Baker & W.T. Dale) Deighton (1976) = Passalora tithoniae
- P. trigonellae S.K. Singh, Arch. Singh & Kamal (1997) = Passalora trigonellae
- P. triloba (Chupp) X.J. Liu & Y.L. Guo (1982) = Pseudocercospora triloba
- P. unamunoi (E. Castell.) Munt.-Cvetk. (1960) = Cercospora capsici
- P. uttarkashiensis Kamal, B.K. Gupta & C. Gupta (1990) = Passalora uttarkashiensis
- P. valerianae H.D. Shin & U. Braun (1998) = Passalora valerianicola
- P. valerianicola H.D. Shin & U. Braun (1993) = Passalora valerianicola
- P. vexans (C. Massal. ex Sacc.) Y.L. Guo (1996) = Passalora vexans
- P. viburni (Ellis & Everh.) U. Braun (1993) = Passalora viburni
- P. weigelae Y.L. Guo & X.J. Liu (1987) = Passalora weigelae
- P. weigelicola U. Braun & H.D. Shin (1996) = Passalora weigelicola
