= Probergrothius sexpunctatus =

Scientific classification
- Kingdom: Animalia
- Phylum: Arthropoda
- Clade: Pancrustacea
- Class: Insecta
- Order: Hemiptera
- Suborder: Heteroptera
- Family: Pyrrhocoridae
- Genus: Probergrothius
- Species: P. sexpunctatus

Binomial name
- Probergrothius sexpunctatus (Laporte, 1832)

Synonyms
- Odontopus sexpunctatus

Species of true bug

Probergrothius sexpunctatus is a species of true bug found in West-Central Africa. The name has been misattributed for many decades to a related species, Probergrothius angolensis, a species that occurs further to the south, and which feeds on the Welwitschia plant.

P. sexpunctatus, as its name suggests, has six prominent black spots on its wings (3 per wing; 2 anteriorly and 1 posteriorly). This distinguishes it from the visually similar P. angolensis, where the two anterior wing spots are typically fused, making four wing spots (2 per wing; 1 anteriorly and posteriorly). P. sexpunctatus also typically has a reddish pronotum and legs, which are black (or almost black) in P. angolensis, however this character is less reliable.
