= Heterosporium =

Scientific classification
- Kingdom: Fungi
- Division: Ascomycota
- Class: Dothideomycetes
- Order: Capnodiales
- Family: Cladosporiaceae
- Genus: Heterosporium; Klotzsch ex Cooke (1877)

Genus of fungi

Heterosporium is a genus of fungi belonging to the family Cladosporiaceae.

The genus has almost cosmopolitan distribution.

== Species ==
As of August 2023, Species Fungorum (in the Catalogue of Life) accepts 10 species of Heterosporium:

- Heterosporium caraganae Vasyag. (1957)
- Heterosporium celastrinum Tilak (1963)
- Heterosporium equiseti H.C.Greene (1951)
- Heterosporium eremostachydis Golovin (1950)
- Heterosporium lonicerae Negru (1959)
- Heterosporium luci Chevaug. (1956)
- Heterosporium medicaginis Karimov (1956)
- Heterosporium petuniae R.Sprague (1965)
- Heterosporium savulescui E.Rădul. & Negru (1959)
- Heterosporium selaginellarum M.L.Farr (1968)
