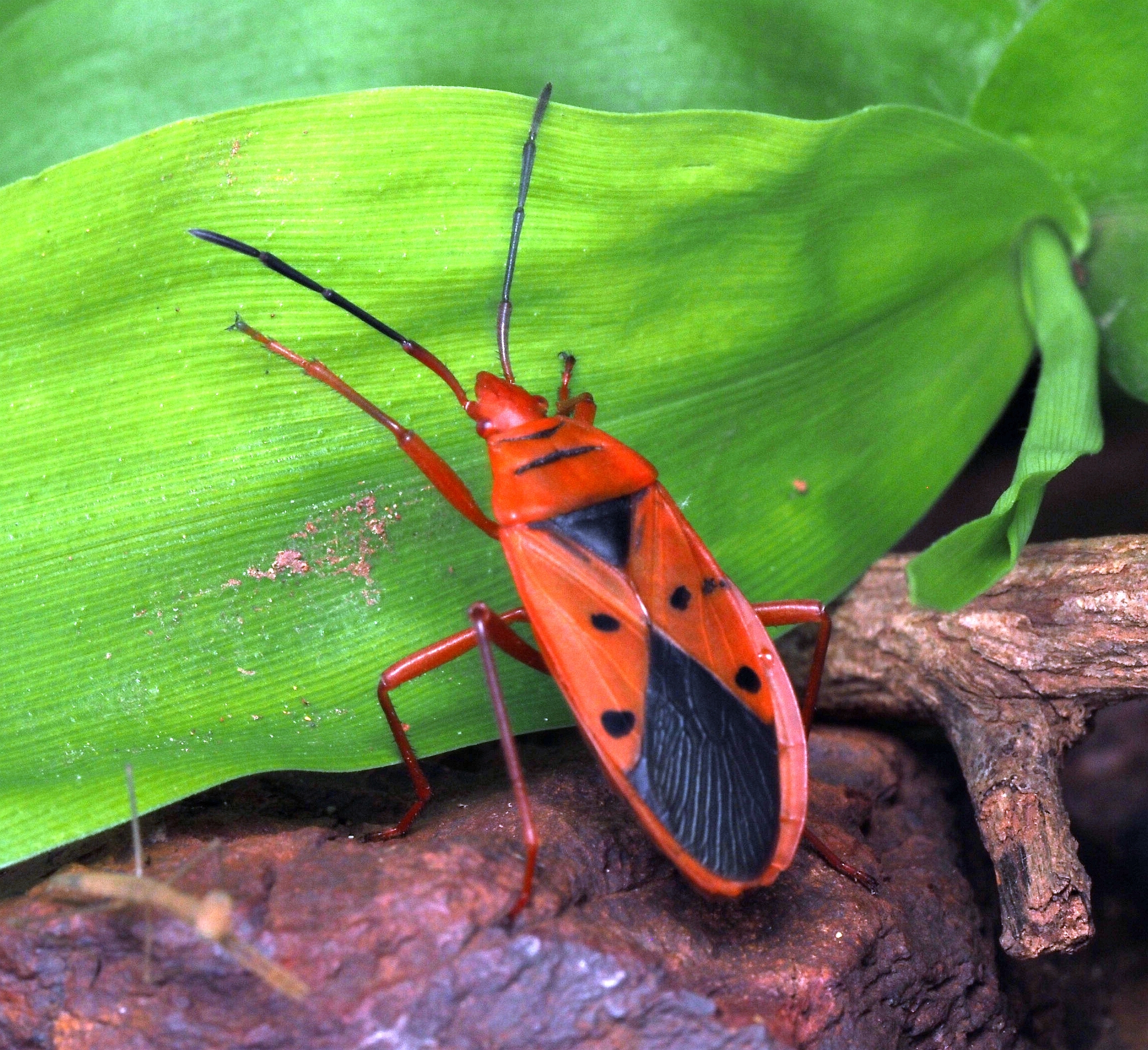

Scientific classification
- Kingdom: Animalia
- Phylum: Arthropoda
- Class: Insecta
- Order: Hemiptera
- Suborder: Heteroptera
- Family: Pyrrhocoridae
- Genus: Probergrothius
- Species: P. scutellaris

Binomial name
- Probergrothius scutellaris (Walker, 1872)

Synonyms
- Odontopus scutellaris

= Probergrothius scutellaris =

Species of insect

Probergrothius scutellaris is a species of pyrrhocorid bug found in South Asia. It was originally described in the genus Odontopus by Francis Walker based on a specimen from Bengal.

The adult bug is red with two black spots on the corium apart from a black scutellum, the apical angle of the corium. Two sutures on the pronotum are black. The first antennal segment is red and the remaining segments are black. The first second and fourth antennal segments are nearly equal in length but the third is shorter.
