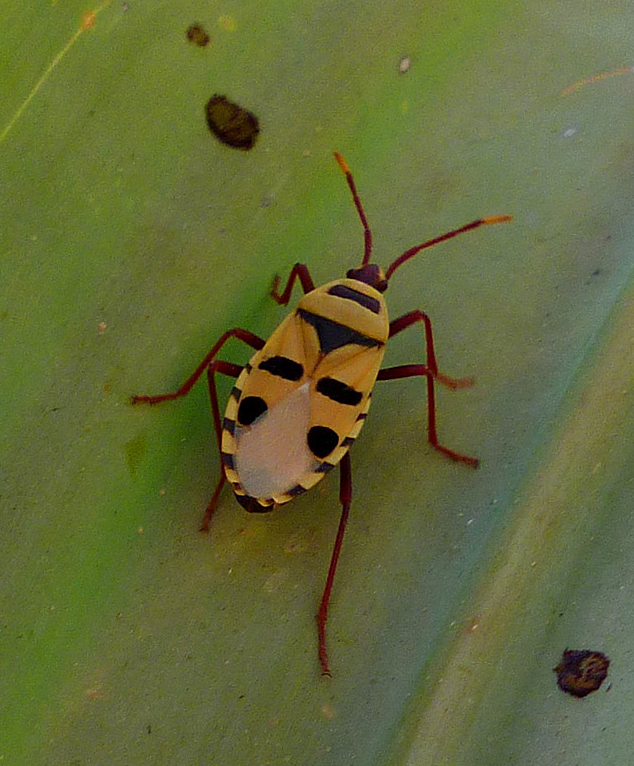
- Adult on Welwitschia

Scientific classification
- Kingdom: Animalia
- Phylum: Arthropoda
- Clade: Pancrustacea
- Class: Insecta
- Order: Hemiptera
- Suborder: Heteroptera
- Family: Pyrrhocoridae
- Genus: Probergrothius
- Species: P. angolensis

Binomial name
- Probergrothius angolensis (Distant, 1902)

Synonyms
- Odontopus angolensis

= Probergrothius angolensis =

Welwitschia bug

Species of true bug

Probergrothius angolensis, sometimes known as the Welwitschia bug, is a species of true bug found in the Namib desert and nearby regions.

== Relationship with Welwitschia ==
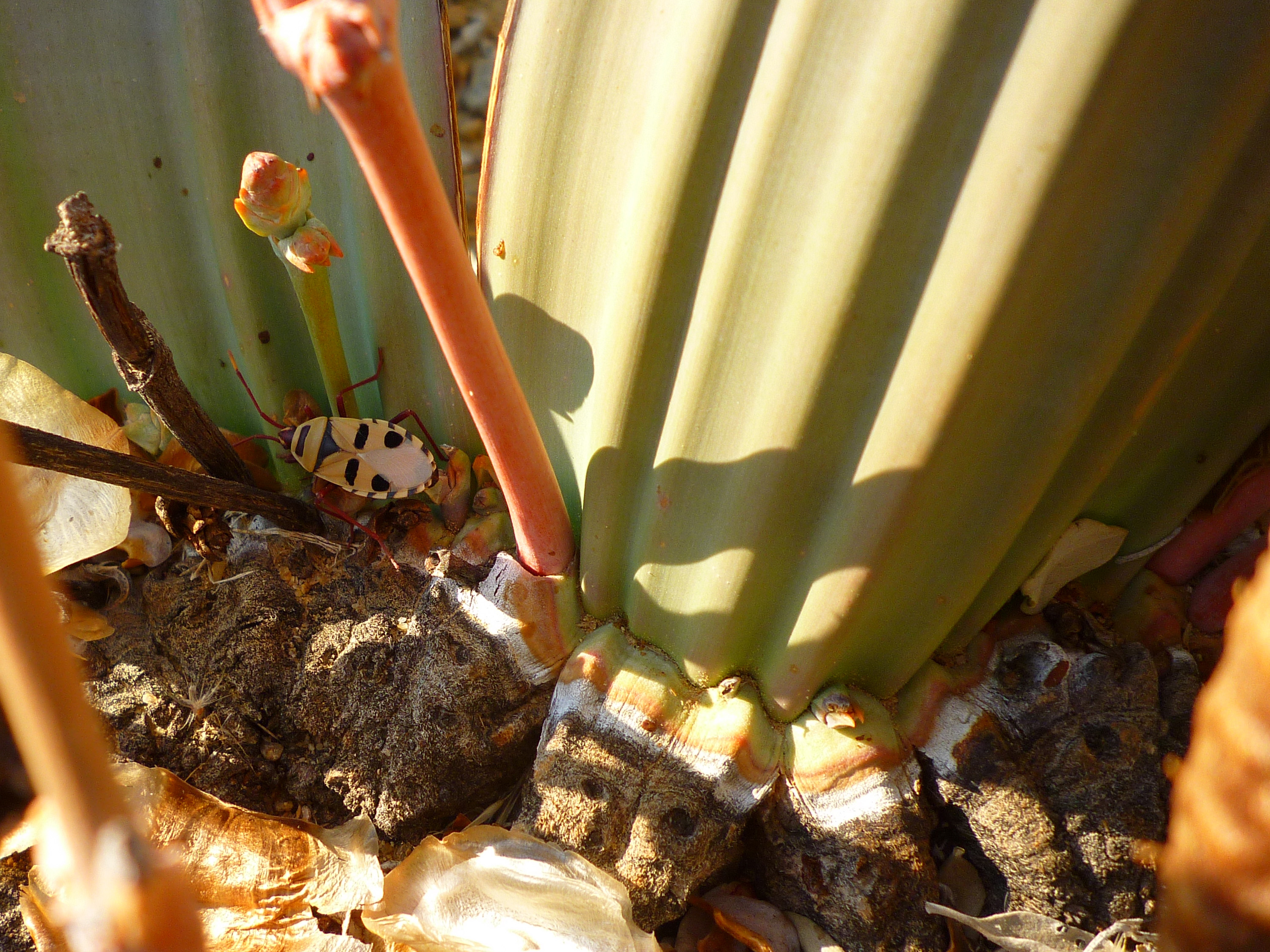
Adult on Welwitschia

The species is best known for its association with the unusual plant Welwitschia mirabilis, also endemic to the area, but it is in doubt whether they actually serve a role in pollination or only drink Welwitschia sap.

== Comparison with Probergrothius sexpunctatus ==
The species has been recognized under a misattributed name, Probergrothius sexpunctatus, for several decades, but P. sexpunctatus is a separate species that occurs farther to the north. P. angolensis is yellowish with four black markings on its wings, while P. sexpunctatus is more reddish, and the anterior spots are separate, so the wings have six black markings.
