= Phaeoramularia manihotis =

Scientific classification
- Domain: Eukaryota
- Kingdom: Fungi
- Division: Ascomycota
- Class: Dothideomycetes
- Order: Capnodiales
- Family: Mycosphaerellaceae
- Genus: Phaeoramularia
- Species: P. manihotis

Binomial name
- Phaeoramularia manihotis (F. Stevens & Solheim) M.B. Ellis, (1976)

Synonyms
- Cercospora caribaea Cif., in Muller & Chupp, (1935); Passalora manihotis (F. Stevens & Solheim) U. Braun & Crous, (2003); Ragnhildiana manihotis F. Stevens & Solheim, (1931)

Species of fungus

Phaeoramularia manihotis is a fungal plant pathogen infecting cassava.
