= Passalora heterosporella =

Scientific classification
- Kingdom: Fungi
- Division: Ascomycota
- Class: Dothideomycetes
- Order: Mycosphaerellales
- Family: Mycosphaerellaceae
- Genus: Passalora
- Species: P. heterosporella

Binomial name
- Passalora heterosporella U. Braun & Crous

Synonyms
- Phaeoramularia heterospora (Ellis & Galloway) Deighton; Septosporium heterosporum Ellis & Galloway

Species of fungus

Passalora heterosporella is a fungal plant pathogen.
