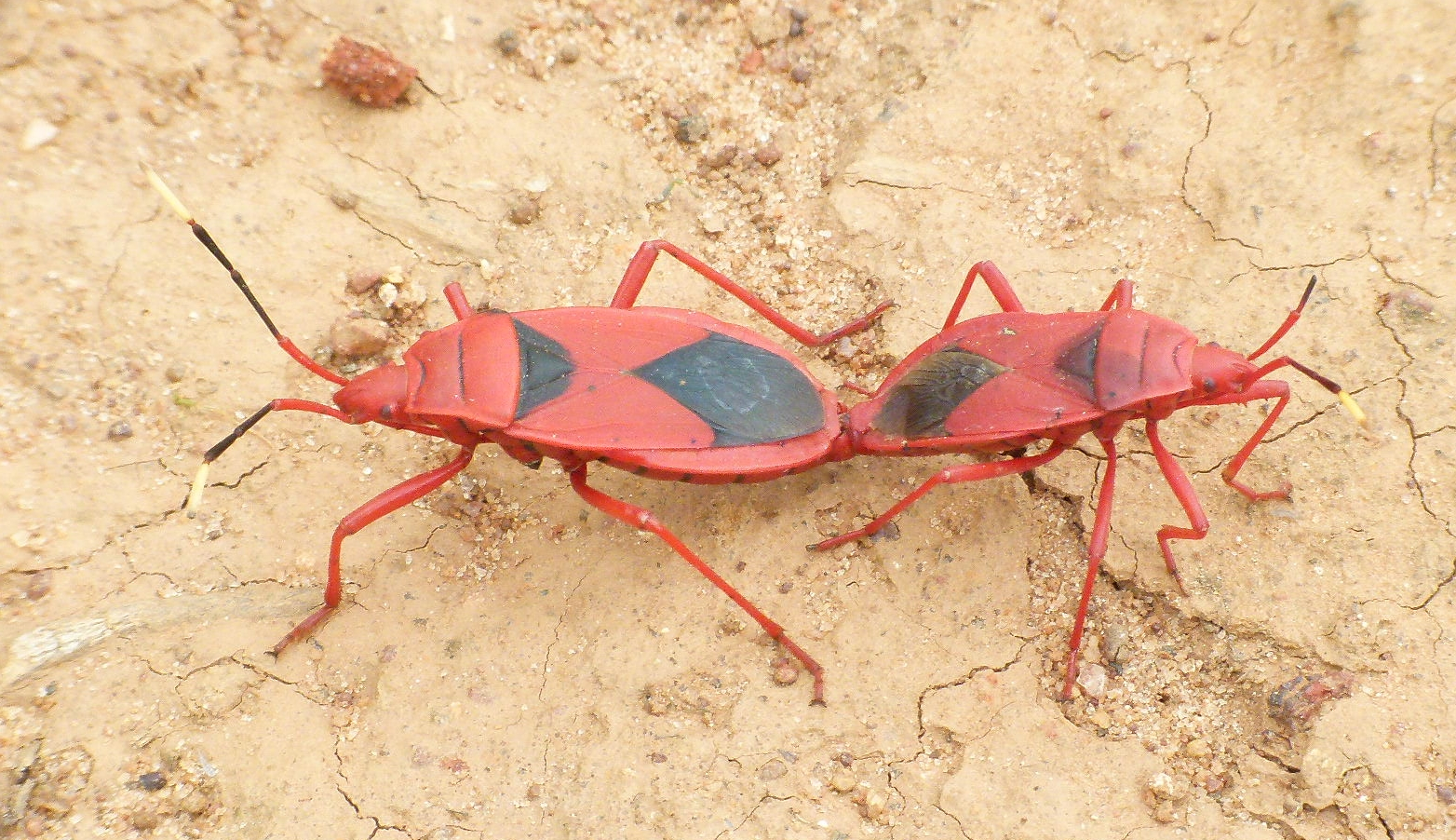
- Mating pair from Bangalore

Scientific classification
- Domain: Eukaryota
- Kingdom: Animalia
- Phylum: Arthropoda
- Class: Insecta
- Order: Hemiptera
- Suborder: Heteroptera
- Family: Pyrrhocoridae
- Genus: Probergrothius
- Species: P. sanguinolens

Binomial name
- Probergrothius sanguinolens (Amyot and Serville, 1843)

Synonyms
- Odontopus sanguinolens

= Probergrothius sanguinolens =

Species of true bug

Probergrothius sanguinolens is a species of bug found in India.

They feed on a range of seeds and are particularly common on the seeds of Sterculia and other Malvaceae. They also feed on freshly dead animal matter with early instar nymphs preferring animal matter to seeds.

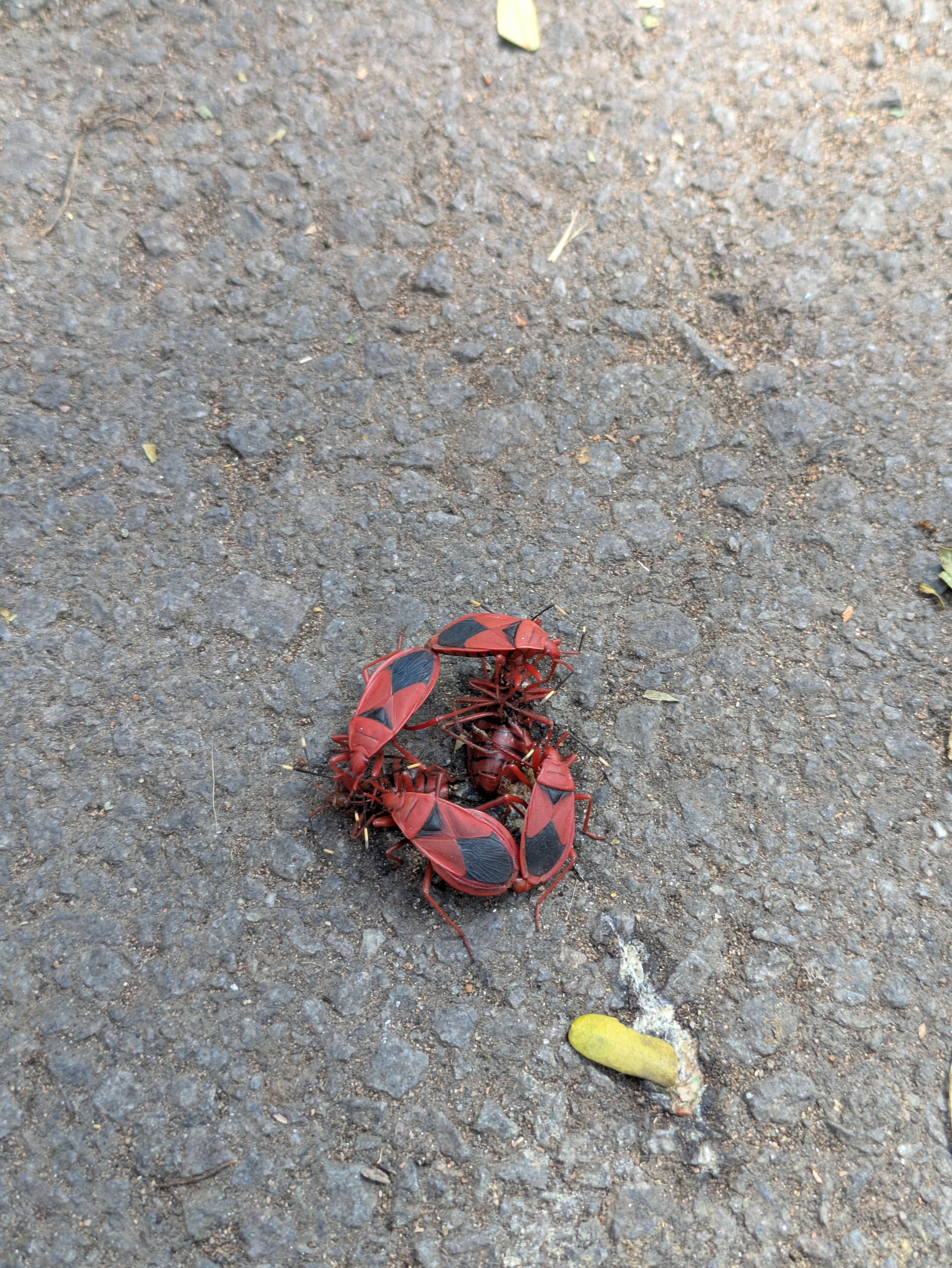
Two pairs of Indian Red Bugs mating over the carcass of another bug.

The adult bug is predominantly red. The second antennal segment is slightly longer than the first. The second and third antennal segments, the scutellum, all or part of the clavus, and wing membrane are black. The fourth segment of the antenna is creamy white and its tip is dusky.

Bacteria in the genus Gordonibacter are known to be gut microsymbionts transmitted from parent to offspring and a phylogenetic study of their mitochondrial gene sequences suggests that the genus Probergrothius split off from the common ancestors of Dysdercus, Dindymus, Scanthius, and Pyrrhocoris around 86.5±23 mya.
