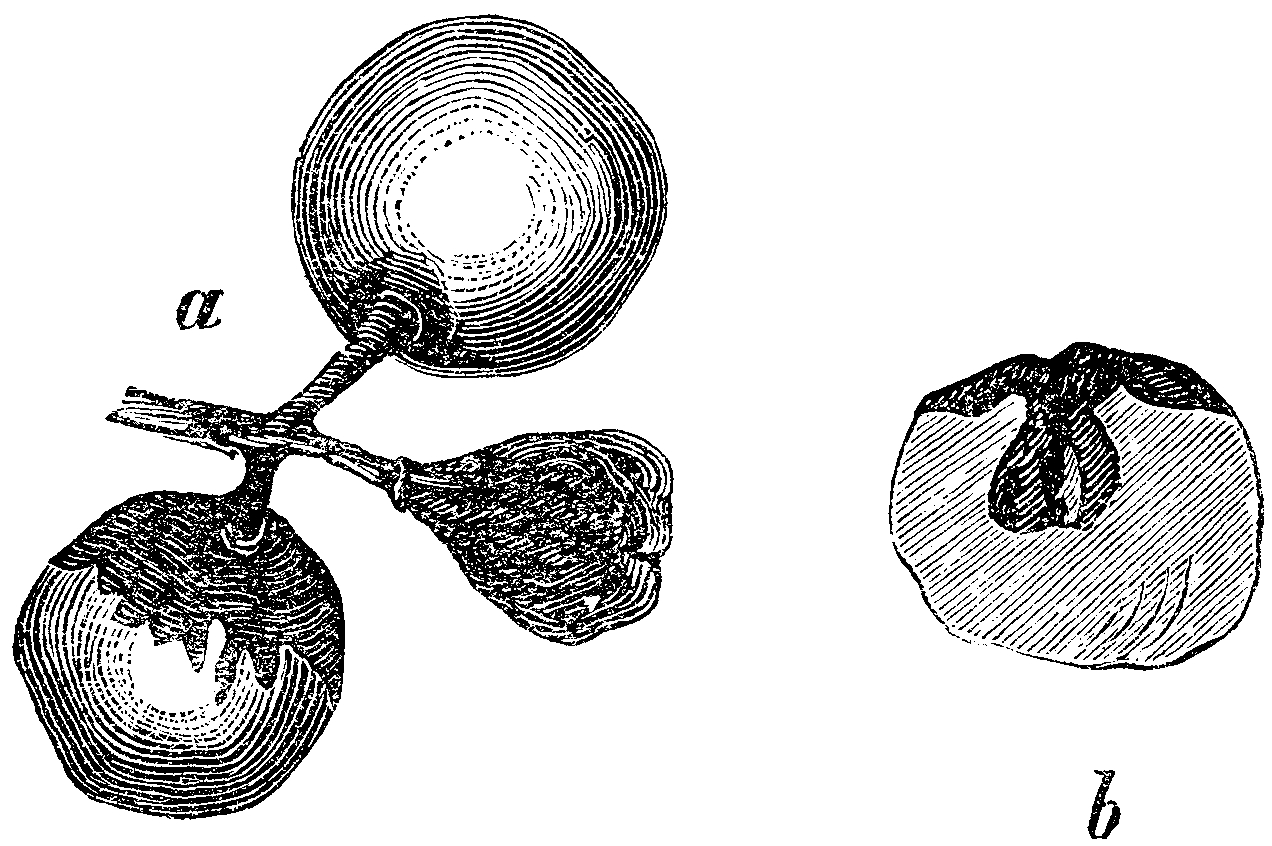
- Cladospórium Roésleri [sic!], illustration #344 in M. Cilenšek: Naše škodljive rastline (1892)

Scientific classification
- Domain: Eukaryota
- Kingdom: Fungi
- Division: Ascomycota
- Class: Dothideomycetes
- Order: Capnodiales
- Family: Mycosphaerellaceae
- Genus: Phaeoramularia
- Species: P. dissiliens

Binomial name
- Phaeoramularia dissiliens (Duby) Deighton, (1976)

Synonyms
- Passalora dissiliens (Duby) U. Braun & Crous, (2003); Septocylindrium dissiliens (Duby) Sacc., (1886); Torula dissiliens Duby, (1836); Cladosporium roesleri Catt., (1876)

= Phaeoramularia dissiliens =

Species of fungus

Phaeoramularia dissiliens is a fungal plant pathogen which causes cercospora leaf spot on grapes.
