= Phaeoramularia angolensis =

Scientific classification
- Domain: Eukaryota
- Kingdom: Fungi
- Division: Ascomycota
- Class: Dothideomycetes
- Order: Capnodiales
- Family: Mycosphaerellaceae
- Genus: Phaeoramularia
- Species: P. angolensis

Binomial name
- Phaeoramularia angolensis (T. Carvalho & O. Mendes) P.M. Kirk, (1986)

Synonyms
- Cercospora angolensis T. Carvalho & O. Mendes, (1953); Pseudocercospora angolensis (T. Carvalho & O. Mendes) Crous & U. Braun, (2003); Pseudophaeoramularia angolensis (T. Carvalho & O. Mendes) U. Braun, (1999)

Species of fungus

Phaeoramularia angolensis is a fungal plant pathogen infecting citruses.
