= Melica subflava =

Scientific classification
- Kingdom: Plantae
- Clade: Tracheophytes
- Clade: Angiosperms
- Clade: Monocots
- Clade: Commelinids
- Order: Poales
- Family: Poaceae
- Subfamily: Pooideae
- Genus: Melica
- Species: M. subflava

Binomial name
- Melica subflava Z.L.Wu

Species of grass

Melica subflava, is a species of grass that is endemic to China.

== Description ==
The species is perennial and caespitose, which is clumped and have absent rhizomes. Its culms are erect and are 50–80 centimetres (20–31 in) long and 2–4 millimetres (0.079–0.157 in) in diameter. The species leaf-sheaths are scabrous, tubular, keeled and are closed on one end. Its eciliate membrane is 2–4 millimetres (0.079–0.157 in) long and is pubescent and truncate on the surface. Panicle is inflorescent and is contracted, linear, secund and is 6–12 centimetres (2.4–4.7 in) long. Peduncle is scabrous above. The panicles have filiform and pubescent pedicels which are hairy above. The spikelets are ovate and are 8–11 millimetres (0.31–0.43 in) long. Florets are diminished at the apex.

Its lemma is obtuse and lobed while fertile lemma is herbaceous, keelless, obovate, and 5.5–7 millimetres (0.22–0.28 in) long. Both low and upper glumes are oblong, scarious, yellow in colour, but are different in size. Also, both glumes have acute apexes. Low glume is 6–8 millimetres (0.24–0.31 in) long with while the upper is 7–11 millimetres (0.28–0.43 in) long. Palea have ciliolate keels and is 2-veined. Its sterile florets are barren, orbicular, and grow in a clump. Flowers anthers are 1 millimetre (0.039 in) long while the fruits are caryopes and have an additional pericarp.

== Ecology ==
It is found on grassy mountain slopes of Qinghai on elevation of 3,600 metres (11,800 ft). It blooms only in August.
