= Melica scaberrima =

Scientific classification
- Kingdom: Plantae
- Clade: Tracheophytes
- Clade: Angiosperms
- Clade: Monocots
- Clade: Commelinids
- Order: Poales
- Family: Poaceae
- Subfamily: Pooideae
- Genus: Melica
- Species: M. scaberrima

Binomial name
- Melica scaberrima (Nees ex Steudel) Hook.f

Synonyms
- Glyceria scaberrima Nees ex Steudel

Species of grass

Melica scaberrima, is a species of grass that can be found in Yunnan, China, Nepal, Pakistan and northern part of India (including Kashmir).

== Description ==
The species is perennial and have elongated rhizomes. It culms are erect and are 50–150 centimetres (20–59 in) long. The species leaf-sheaths are tubular and scabrous with one of their length being closed. It eciliate membrane is 1–2 millimetres (0.039–0.079 in) long and have a glabrous surface. They also have flat leaf-blades which are 15–35 centimetres (5.9–13.8 in) long by 3–5.5 millimetres (0.12–0.22 in) wide and have scaberulous surface.

The panicle itself is open and is 20–40 centimetres (7.9–15.7 in) long. The branches are distant and are 6–15 centimetres (2.4–5.9 in) long. The spikelets are oblong, solitary and are made out of 2–3 fertile florets that are 8.5–13 millimetres (0.33–0.51 in) long. Fertile spikelets are pediceled, the pedicels of which are filiform and are 2–6 millimetres (0.079–0.236 in) long. Florets are diminished at the apex.

Its lemma have scabrous surface and acute apex with fertile lemma is being chartaceous, elliptic, keelless, and is 7–8.5 millimetres (0.28–0.33 in) long. Both the lower and upper glumes are elliptic, keelless, membranous, and have acute apexes. Their size is different; Lower glume is 3.5–4.5 millimetres (0.14–0.18 in) long while the upper one is 4.8–6.3 millimetres (0.19–0.25 in) long. Palea is 2-veined. Flowers are fleshy, oblong, truncate, have 2 lodicules, and grow together. They have 3 anthers which have fruits that are caryopsis and have an additional pericarp with linear hilum.

== Ecology ==
It is found on forest edges, slopes, and grass at 2,800–4,000 metres (9,200–13,100 ft) above sea level. It blooms from July to August.
