= Melica tenuis =

Scientific classification
- Kingdom: Plantae
- Clade: Tracheophytes
- Clade: Angiosperms
- Clade: Monocots
- Clade: Commelinids
- Order: Poales
- Family: Poaceae
- Subfamily: Pooideae
- Genus: Melica
- Species: M. tenuis

Binomial name
- Melica tenuis Arechav.

Species of grass

Melica tenuis, is a species of grass that can be found in Brazil, Paraguay, Uruguay and Argentinian provinces such as Misioines and Entre Rios.

== Description ==
The species is perennial and caespitose with short rhizomes. It culms are 20–150 centimetres (7.9–59.1 in) long and are growing together. Leaf-sheaths are closed, scabrous, glabrous and are split. It ligules are 0.1–0.3 millimetres (0.0039–0.0118 in) long with ligular part being densely pubescent and is not persistent. The species also have stiff and linear leaf-blades which are 10–15 millimetres (0.39–0.59 in) long and 1.5–2 millimetres (0.059–0.079 in) wide. They are also straight and flat with lower surface being rough and glabrous. It upper surface though is striate-hispid with scabrous margins.

The panicle is 8–18 centimetres (3.1–7.1 in) long by 1–1.5 centimetres (0.39–0.59 in) wide and is also linear, narrow and contracted, with a lot of spikelets. The species' rachis is scaorus while it branches are scabrous. It spikelets are obconic and are violet in colour. It also have filiform pedicels which are curved and puberulent. The species' lower glume is 4–5.5 millimetres (0.16–0.22 in) long and wide and is also either obovate or flabelliform and papery-membranous. The upper glume though is oblong and is 5–5.5 millimetres (0.20–0.22 in) long by 1.5–1.8 millimetres (0.059–0.071 in) wide. Both first and second florets are bisexual but the second one is hairless. The species lemma is lanceolate, and is 5–5.5 millimetres (0.20–0.22 in) long by 1.5–2 millimetres (0.059–0.079 in) wide. It palea is 3–3.5 millimetres (0.12–0.14 in) long and about 1 millimetre (0.039 in) wide. Fruits are brown, caryopsis and are 1.8–2 millimetres (0.071–0.079 in) long by 0.7–0.8 millimetres (0.028–0.031 in) wide.
