= Melica patagonica =

Scientific classification
- Kingdom: Plantae
- Clade: Tracheophytes
- Clade: Angiosperms
- Clade: Monocots
- Clade: Commelinids
- Order: Poales
- Family: Poaceae
- Subfamily: Pooideae
- Genus: Melica
- Species: M. patagonica

Binomial name
- Melica patagonica Parodi

Species of grass

Melica patagonica is a species of grass that is endemic to South America.

== Description ==
The species is perennial, caespitose and clumped while culms are decumbent and are 20–40 centimetres (7.9–15.7 in) long. The leaf-sheaths are scabrous, tubular, are closed on one end and are glabrous on surface. The leaf-blades are convolute, filiform, and are 4–6 millimetres (0.16–0.24 in) long by 1 millimetre (0.039 in) wide. They also have scabrous margins and pubescent surface. The panicle is open, linear and is 6–14 centimetres (2.4–5.5 in) long. The axis of the panicle is dominant while the main panicle branches are appressed.

Spikelets are elliptic, solitary, are 5.5–6.5 millimetres (0.22–0.26 in) long and have fertile spikelets that are pediceled. The pedicels are ciliate, curved, filiform, and hairy above. The spikelets have 1-2 fertile florets which are diminished at the apex while the sterile florets are barren, cuneate, and clumped with both its rhachilla and its floret callus being pubescent. Both the upper and lower glumes are keelless, membranous and are of the same size as spikelets. Their other features are different; Lower glume is elliptic with an acute apex while the upper one is lanceolate, and have obtuse apex.

The species' lemma have ciliated and hairy margins with obtuse apex. The hairs are 0.8–1 millimetre (0.031–0.039 in) long while the fertile lemma is chartaceous, lanceolate, and is 4.5–5.5 millimetres (0.18–0.22 in) long by 2 millimetres (0.079 in) wide. Its palea have ciliolated keels and emarginated apex. It is also oblanceolate, 3.5–4 millimetres (0.14–0.16 in) long and is 2 veined. Flowers are fleshy, oblong, truncate and are 0.2–0.3 millimetres (0.0079–0.0118 in) long. They also grow together, and have 3 anthers that are 1–1.5 millimetres (0.039–0.059 in) long. The fruits have caryopsis with additional pericarp and linear hilum. They also are ellipsoid and 2.5–2.8 millimetres (0.098–0.110 in) long.

== Ecology ==
Its flowering time is from October to December.
