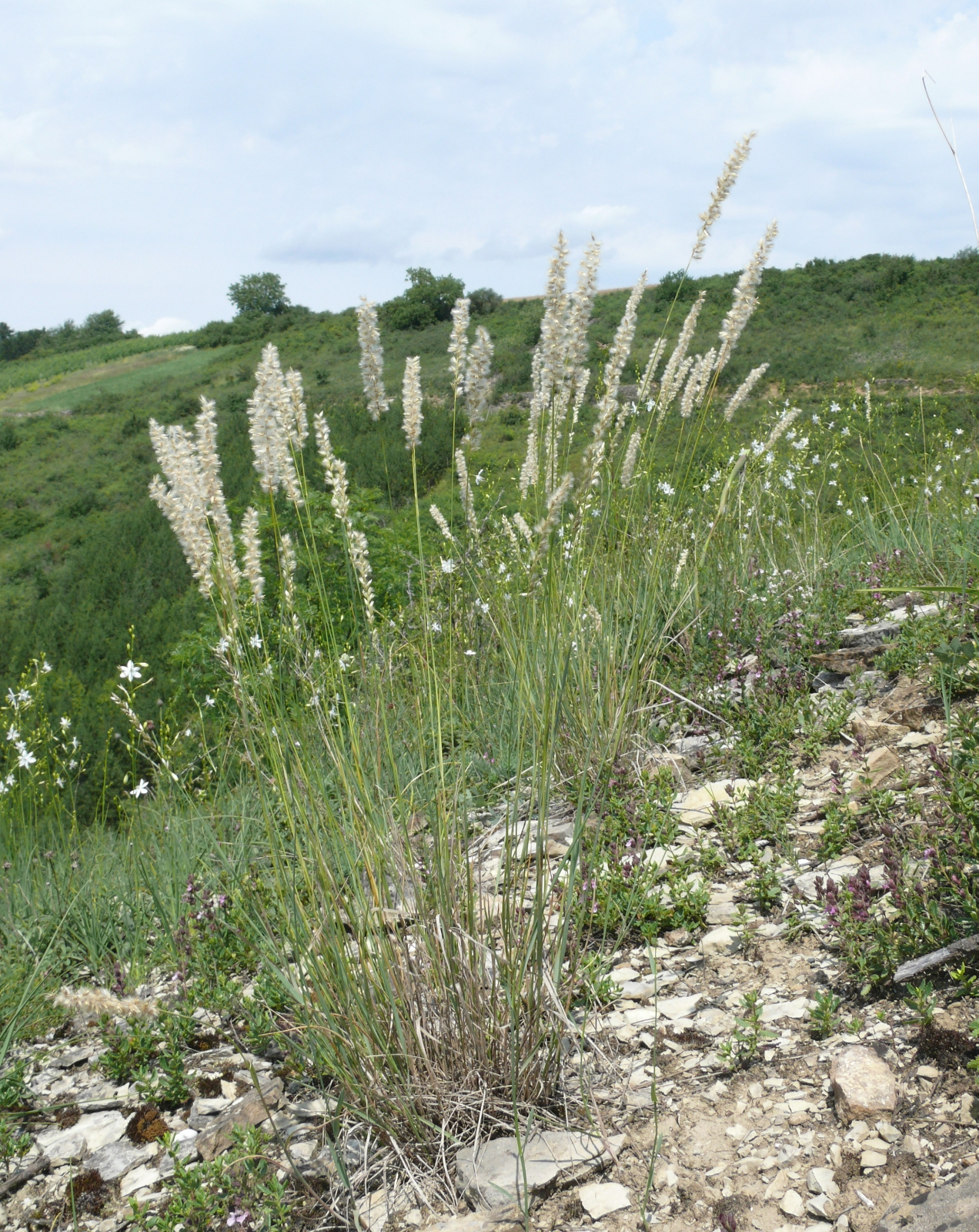
- Melica ciliata

Scientific classification
- Kingdom: Plantae
- Clade: Tracheophytes
- Clade: Angiosperms
- Clade: Monocots
- Clade: Commelinids
- Order: Poales
- Family: Poaceae
- Subfamily: Pooideae
- Supertribe: Melicodae
- Tribe: Meliceae
- Genus: Melica; L.

Species
- See text

= Melica =

Genus of grasses

Melica is a genus of perennial grasses known generally as melic or melic grass. They are found in most temperate regions of the world.

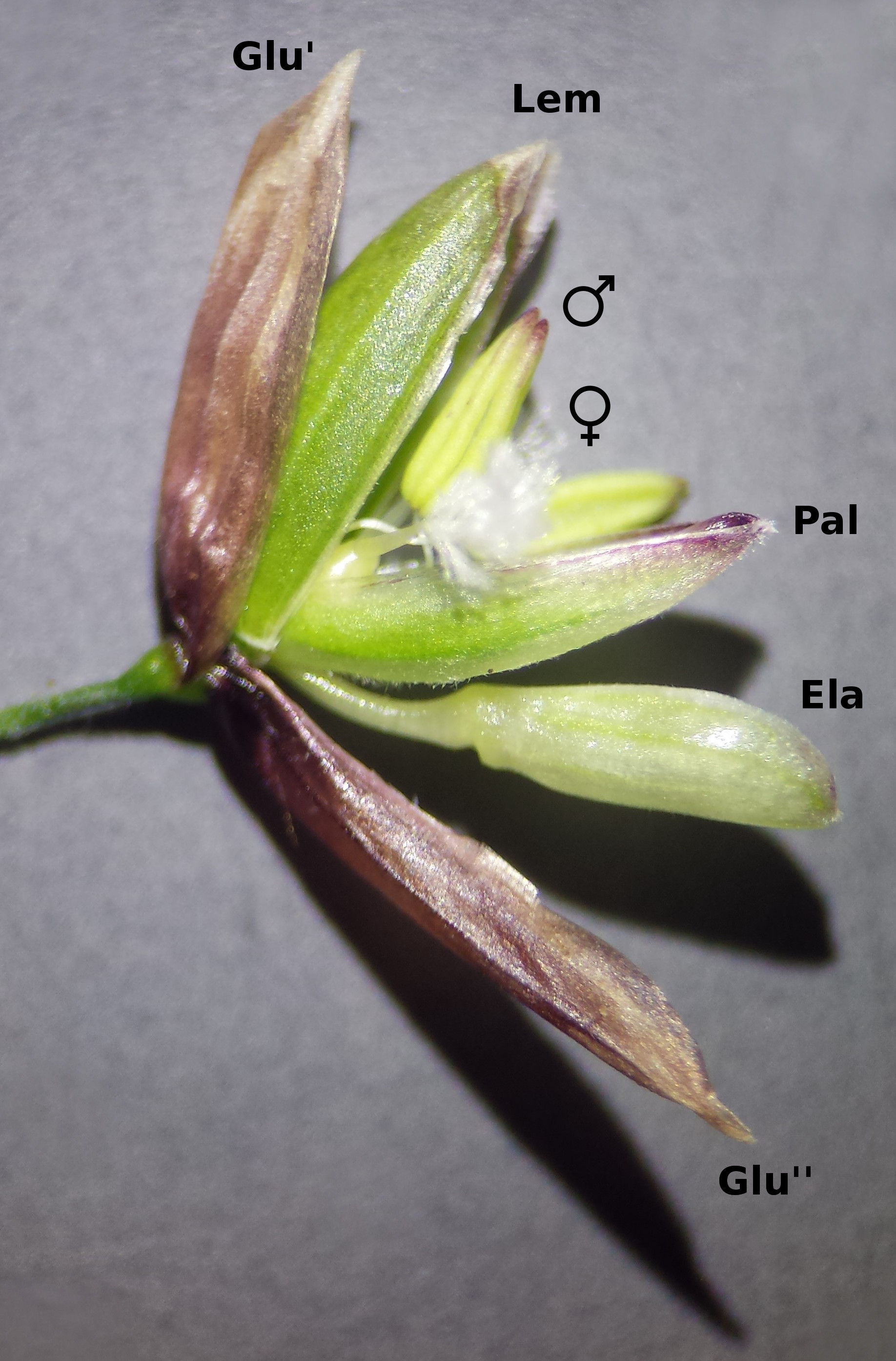
Melica uniflora spikelet

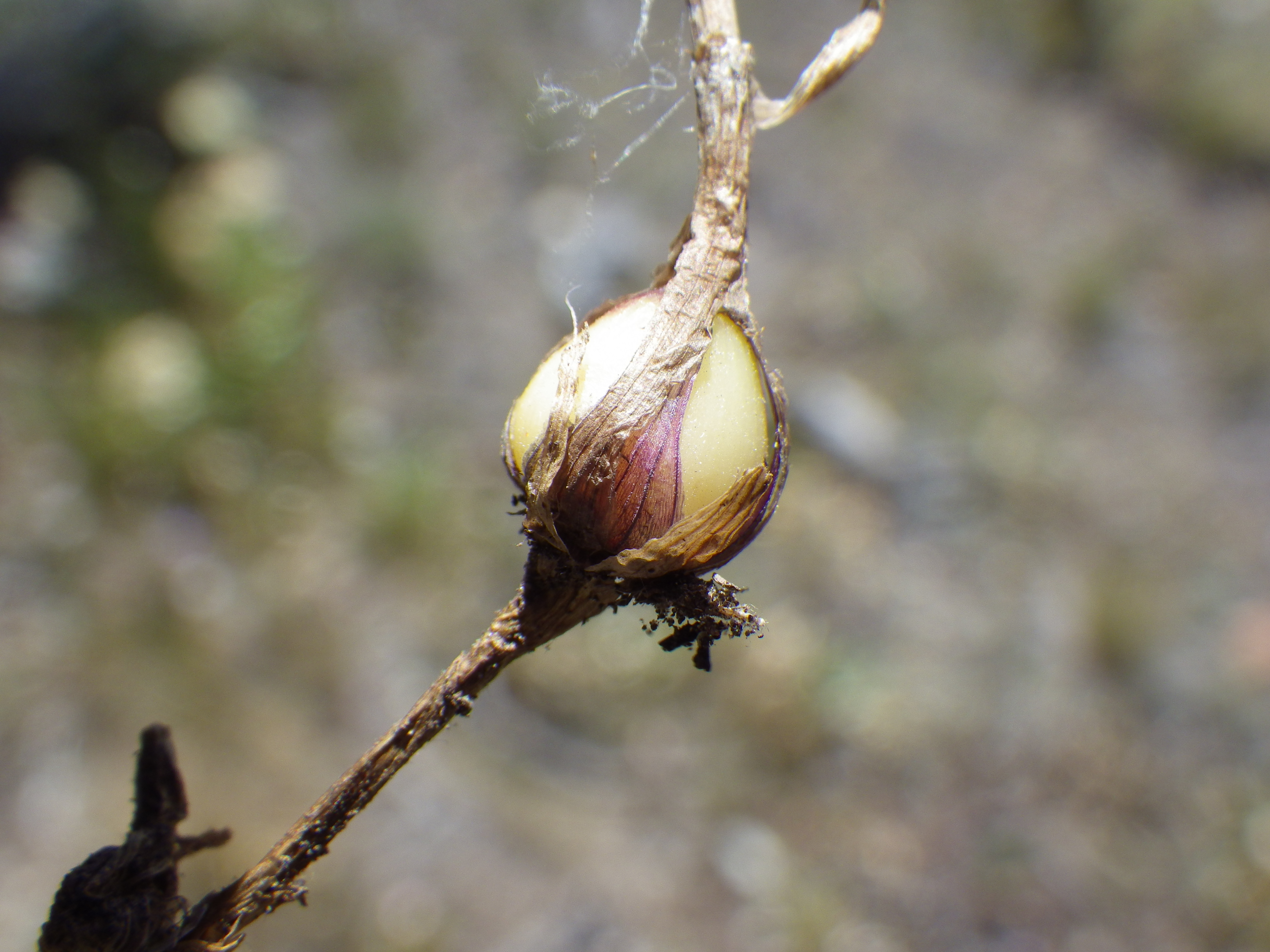
Corm of Melica spectabilis, purple oniongrass

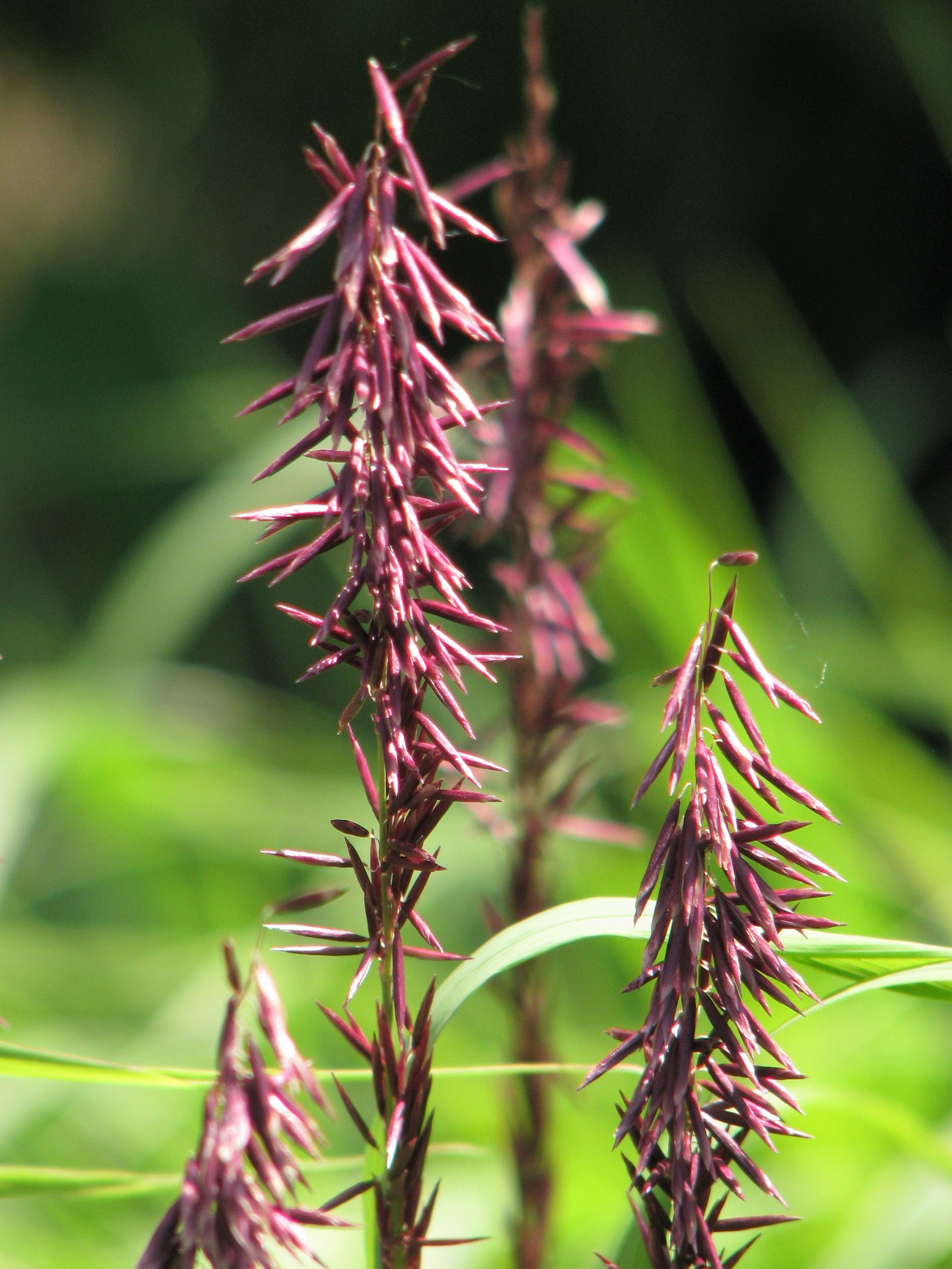
Melica altissima 'Atropurpurea' cultivar

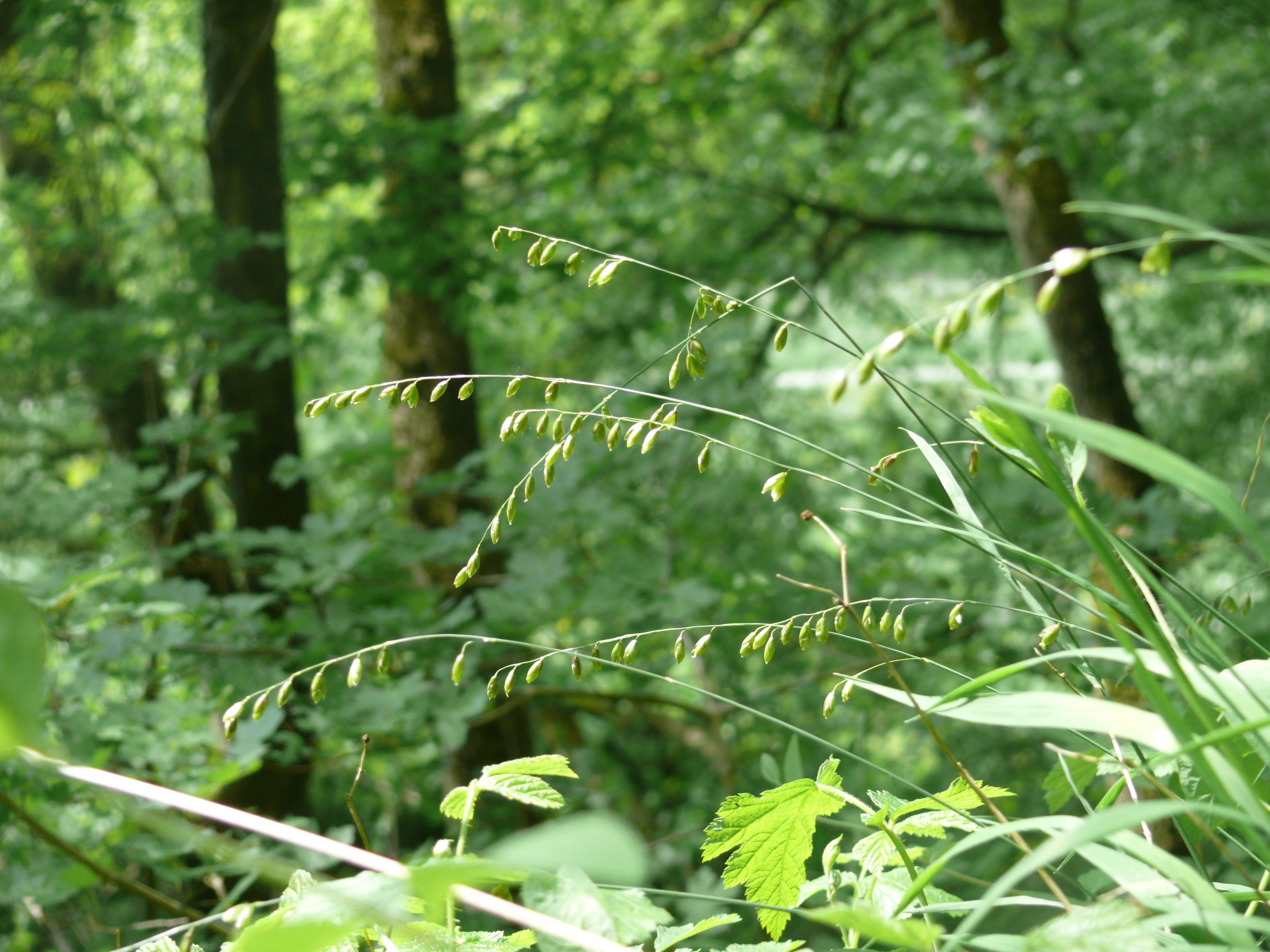
Melica picta in situ

Melic grasses are clumping to short-rhizomatous grasses. They have flowering culms up to 250 cm (98 in) tall bearing spikelets of papery flowers. The spikelets have between one and seven fertile flowers with a rudimentary structure at the distal end composed of one to four sterile florets. Some species of melic have corms, lending them the name oniongrass.

The genus is most diverse in South America and temperate Asia. Eight species are endemic to China. In North America, most species occur west of the Mississippi River, with exceptions being Melica mutica and M. nitens which occur throughout much of the southeast and lower Midwest respectively.

== Species ==
Species and hybrids include:

- Melica altissima L. – Siberian melic grass
- Melica amethystina Pourr.
- Melica animarum Muj.-Sall. & M.Marchi
- Melica argentata É.Desv.
- Melica argyrea Hack.
- Melica aristata Thurb. ex Bol. – bearded melic grass
- Melica arzivencoi Valls & Barcellos
- Melica × aschersonii M.Schulze
- Melica bocquetii Talavera
- Melica bonariensis Parodi
- Melica brasiliana Ard.
- Melica brevicoronata Roseng.
- Melica bulbosa Porter & J.M.Coult. – oniongrass
- Melica californica Scribn. – California melic grass
- Melica canariensis W.Hempel
- Melica capillaris Sol.
- Melica cepacea (Phil.) Scribn.
- Melica chilensis J.Presl
- Melica ciliata L. – hairy melic, silky spike melic
- Melica commersonii Nees ex Steud.
- Melica cupani Guss.
- Melica decipiens Caro
- Melica dendroides Lehm.
- Melica eligulata Boiss.
- Melica eremophila Torres
- Melica frutescens Scribn. – woody melicgrass
- Melica fugax Bol. – little oniongrass
- Melica geyeri Munro ex Bol. – Geyer's oniongrass
- Melica glabrescens (Torres) Torres
- Melica grandiflora Koidz.
- Melica harfordii Bol. – Harford's oniongrass
- Melica × haussknechtii W.Hempel
- Melica hunzikeri Nicora
- Melica hyalina Döll
- Melica imperfecta Trin. – smallflower melic
- Melica kozlovii Tzvelev
- Melica lilloi Bech.
- Melica longiflora Steud.
- Melica longiligulata Z.L.Wu
- Melica macra Nees
- Melica minor Hack. ex Boiss.
- Melica minuta L. – small melic
- Melica mollis Phil.
- Melica montezumae Piper – Montezuma melic
- Melica mutica Walter – two-flower melic grass
- Melica nitens (Scribn.) Nutt. ex Piper – three-flower melic grass
- Melica nutans L. – mountain melic; nodding melic
- Melica onoei Franch. & Sav.
- Melica pappiana W.Hempel
- Melica parodiana Torres
- Melica patagonica Parodi
- Melica paulsenii Phil.
- Melica penicillaris Boiss. & Balansa
- Melica persica Kunth
- Melica picta K.Koch
- Melica poecilantha É.Desv.
- Melica porteri Scribn.
- Melica przewalskyi Roshev.
- Melica racemosa Thunb.
- Melica radula Franch.
- Melica rectiflora Boiss. & Heldr.
- Melica rigida Cav.
- Melica riograndensis Longhi-Wagner & Valls
- Melica sarmentosa Nees
- Melica scaberrima (Nees ex Steud.) Hook.f.
- Melica scabra Kunth
- Melica scabrosa Trin.
- Melica schafkatii Bondarenko
- Melica schuetzeana W.Hempel
- Melica secunda Regel
- Melica serrana Muj.-Sall. & M.Marchi
- Melica smirnovii Tzvelev
- Melica smithii (Porter ex A.Gray) Vasey – Smith's melicgrass
- Melica spartinoides L.B.Sm.
- Melica spectabilis Scribn. – purple oniongrass
- Melica stricta Bol. – rock melic grass
- Melica stuckertii Hack.
- Melica subflava Z.L.Wu &
- Melica subulata (Griseb.) Scribn. – Alaska oniongrass
- Melica tangutorum Tzvelev
- Melica taylorii W.Hempel
- Melica teneriffae Hack. ex Christ
- Melica tenuis Arechav.
- Melica × thuringiaca Rauschert
- Melica tibetica Roshev.
- Melica torreyana Scribn. – Torrey's melic
- Melica transsilvanica Schur
- Melica turczaninowiana Ohwi
- Melica × tzvelevii W.Hempel
- Melica uniflora Retz.
- Melica violacea Cav.
- Melica virgata Turcz. ex Trin.
- Melica × weinii W.Hempel
- Melica yajiangensis Z.L.Wu
