= Melica tangutorum =

Scientific classification
- Kingdom: Plantae
- Clade: Tracheophytes
- Clade: Angiosperms
- Clade: Monocots
- Clade: Commelinids
- Order: Poales
- Family: Poaceae
- Subfamily: Pooideae
- Genus: Melica
- Species: M. tangutorum

Binomial name
- Melica tangutorum Tzvelev

Species of grass

Melica tangutorum, is a species of grass found in China (Gansu, Qinghai, Sichuan) and Mongolia.

== Description ==
The species is perennial and caespitose, which is clumped as well. It culms are 30–80 centimetres (12–31 in) long while it interlodes are scabrous. The species leaf-sheaths are tubular and scabrous with one of their length being closed. It eciliate membrane is 2.5–6.5 millimetres (0.098–0.256 in) long and have a glabrous surface. They also have flat leaf-blades which are 1–3.5 millimetres (0.039–0.138 in) wide and have rough and scabrous surface.

The panicle itself is open and linear, and is 10–20 centimetres (3.9–7.9 in) long. It is also interrupted, dense, and secund with scaberulous branches. The panicle branches are capillary and carry distant spikelets. The spikelets themselves are made out of 2–3 fertile florets are oblong and are 4–7 millimetres (0.16–0.28 in) long. Fertile spikelets are pediceled, the pedicels of which are ciliate, flexuous, hairy and are 1–7 millimetres (0.039–0.276 in) long. Florets are diminished at the apex.

Its lemma have scabrous surface and emarginated apex with fertile lemma being coriaceous, keelless, oblong, and 3–4.5 millimetres (0.12–0.18 in) long. Both the lower and upper glumes are elliptic, keelless, membranous, and have acute apexes. Their size is different; Lower glume is 2.7–4 millimetres (0.11–0.16 in) long while the upper one is 3–4.5 millimetres (0.12–0.18 in) long. Palea is elliptic, have scabrous surface and is 2-veined. Flowers are fleshy, oblong, truncate, have 2 lodicules, and grow together. They have 3 anthers which are 0.7–1 millimetre (0.028–0.039 in) long which have fruits that are caryopses and have an additional pericarp with linear hilum.

== Ecology ==
It is found on rocky mountain slopes, and gravel river banks on elevation of 1,500–3,200 metres (4,900–10,500 ft). It blooms from August to September.
