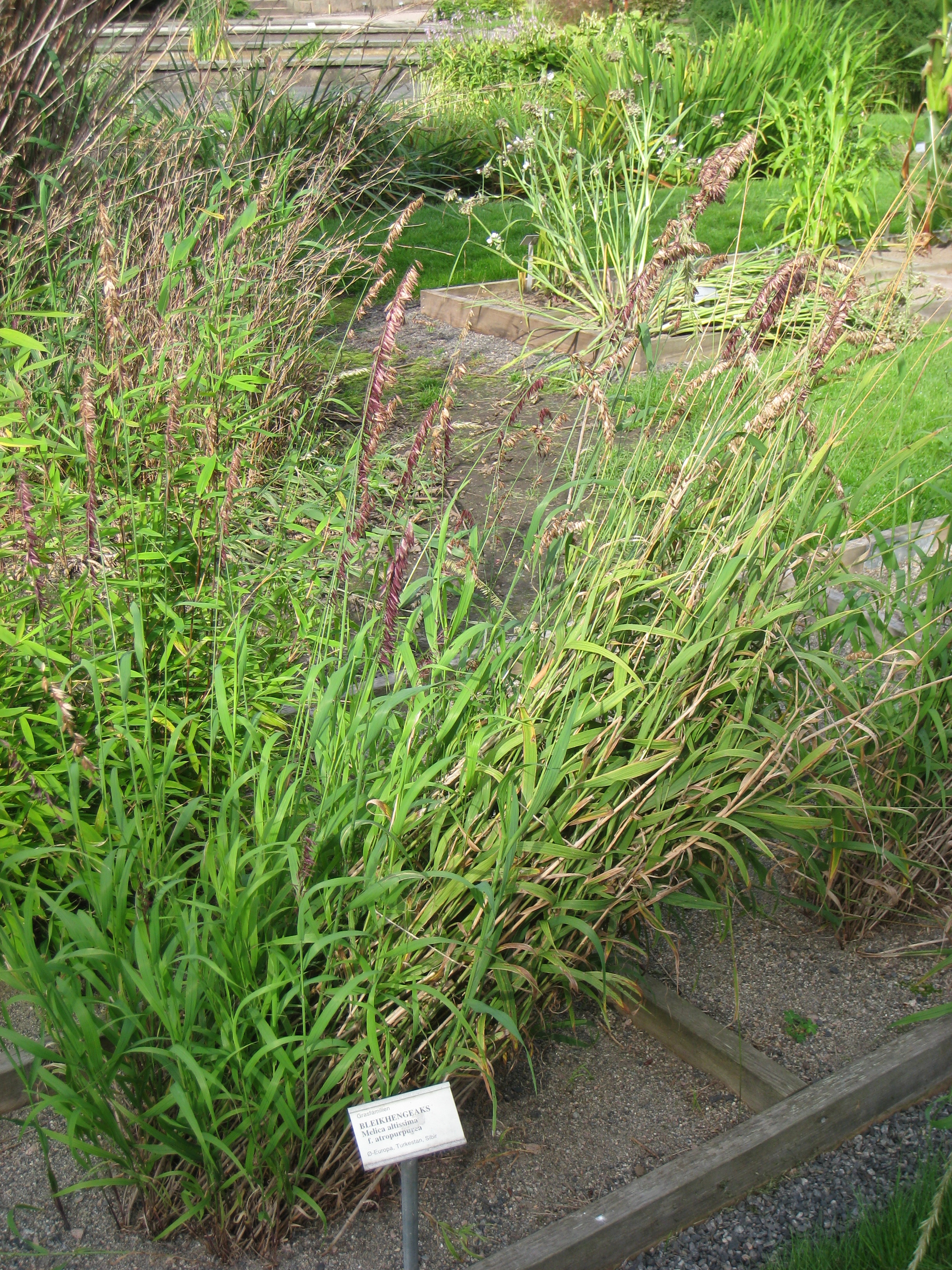
- Melica altissima 'Atropurpurea' at the Oslo Botanical Garden

Scientific classification
- Kingdom: Plantae
- Clade: Tracheophytes
- Clade: Angiosperms
- Clade: Monocots
- Clade: Commelinids
- Order: Poales
- Family: Poaceae
- Subfamily: Pooideae
- Genus: Melica
- Species: M. altissima

Binomial name
- Melica altissima L.

= Melica altissima =

Species of grass

Melica altissima, commonly known as Siberian melic grass or dark purple Siberian melic, is a species of plant in the grass family, Poaceae.

It has been naturalized in North America, in Ontario, Oklahoma and New York.
