= Melica brevicoronata =

Scientific classification
- Kingdom: Plantae
- Clade: Tracheophytes
- Clade: Angiosperms
- Clade: Monocots
- Clade: Commelinids
- Order: Poales
- Family: Poaceae
- Subfamily: Pooideae
- Genus: Melica
- Species: M. brevicoronata

Binomial name
- Melica brevicoronata Roseng.

Synonyms
- Andropogon glaucophyllus

Species of grass

Melica brevicoronata, is a grass species in the family Poaceae that can be found in Brazil, southern South America, and Cerro Pan de Azúcar, Uruguay.

== Description ==
The species is perennial with elongated rhizomes and pilose butt sheaths. Its culms are erect and are 40–110 centimetres (16–43 in) long. Leaf-sheaths are tubular with one of their lengths being closed. Its eciliate membrane is 0.5–7 millimetres (0.020–0.276 in) long with leaf-blades being 10–20 millimetres (0.39–0.79 in) long and 1–3 millimetres (0.039–0.118 in) wide. They also have scabrous bottom, are pubescent and a bit hairy. The panicle is open, is linear and is 10–25 centimetres (3.9–9.8 in) long. The main panicle branches are spread out. It spikelets are elliptic, solitary and are 8–11 millimetres (0.31–0.43 in) long. Fertile spikelets have ciliated, curved and filiform pedicels.

Margins of lemma are ciliate. The lemma itself though is 1 millimetre (0.039 in) long and has obtuse apex. Fertile lemma is chartaceous and is 5–5.5 millimetres (0.20–0.22 in) long and 2.5 millimetres (0.098 in) wide. Palea have scaberulous keels and surface. Rhachilla is 4 millimetres (0.16 in) in length and is extended. Lower glumes are elliptic and are 8–11 millimetres (0.31–0.43 in) long while the upper glumes are lanceolate and are 6–7 millimetres (0.24–0.28 in) long. Both the lower and upper glumes are obtuse and have asperulous surfaces. Flowers are fleshy, oblong, truncate, and grow together, the 3 anthers of which are 1–2 millimetres (0.039–0.079 in) in length. Fruits are brown coloured, ellipsoid and have an additional pericarp and are 3 millimetres (0.12 in) long with linear hilum.
