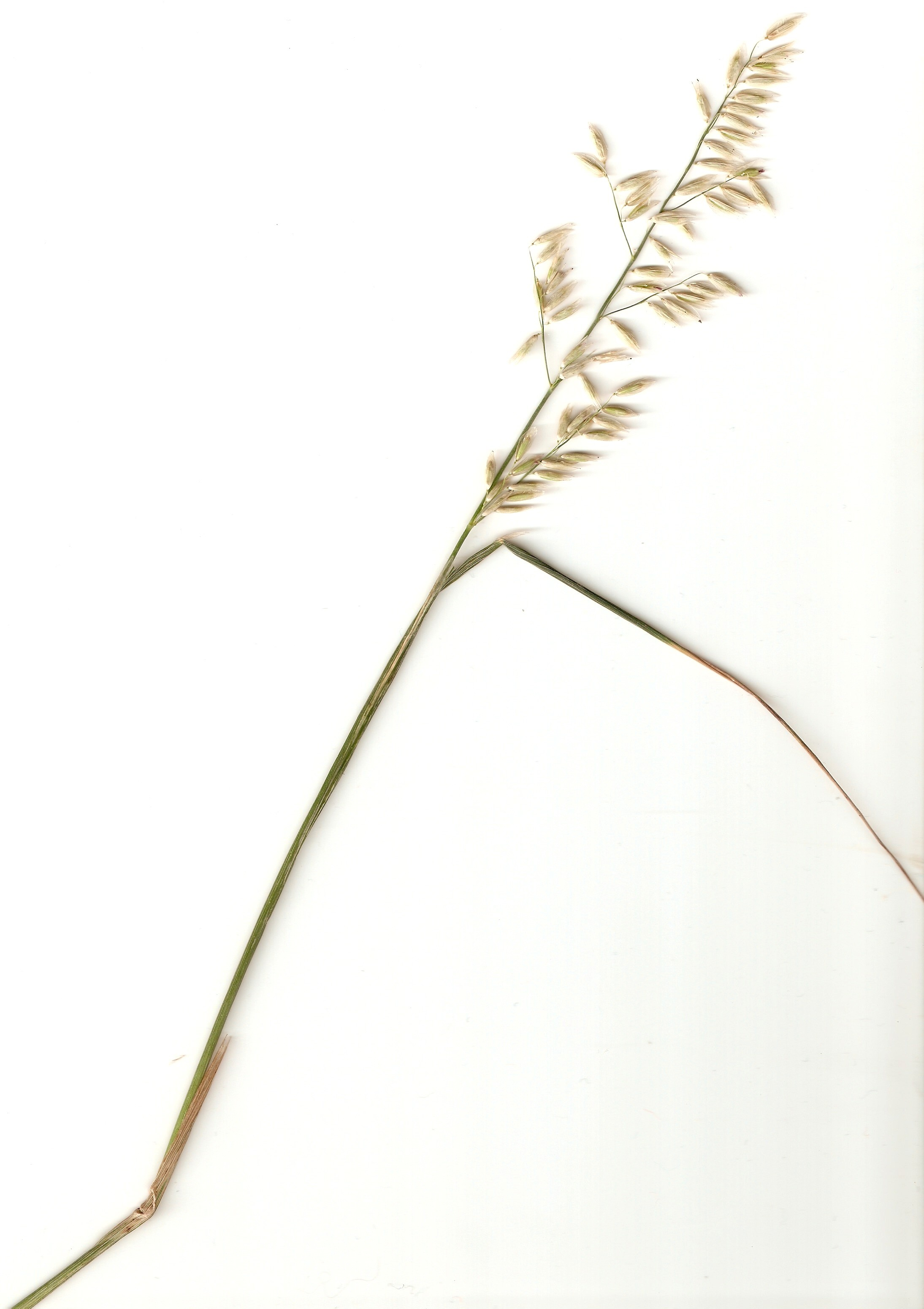

Scientific classification
- Kingdom: Plantae
- Clade: Tracheophytes
- Clade: Angiosperms
- Clade: Monocots
- Clade: Commelinids
- Order: Poales
- Family: Poaceae
- Subfamily: Pooideae
- Genus: Melica
- Species: M. violacea

Binomial name
- Melica violacea Cav.

= Melica violacea =

Species of grass

Melica violacea is a species of grass in the family Poaceae endemic to Chile.

== Description ==
The species is perennial and caespitose with thick butt sheaths which are forming a bulb. Its culms are 20–70 centimetres (7.9–27.6 in) long and 1–4 millimetres (0.039–0.157 in) in diameter. The species leaf-sheaths are tubular and pilose with one of their length being closed. Its eciliate membrane is 2–6 millimetres (0.079–0.236 in) long while its leaf-blades are 2.5–12.5 millimetres (0.098–0.492 in) long and 1.8–3 millimetres (0.071–0.118 in) wide with pilose surface.

The panicle itself is contracted, linear, secund, is 5–18 centimetres (2.0–7.1 in) long and bears a small amount of spikelets. Spikelets themselves are solitary, elliptic, and are 8–11 millimetres (0.31–0.43 in) long. The species fertile spikelets are pediceled, the pedicels of which are ciliate, curved, hairy and filiform. Florets are diminished at the apex and have a pubescent callus.

Its lemma have a dentate apex while its surface is scaberulous. Fertile lemma is 4.5–8 millimetres (0.18–0.31 in) long and 2–3.2 millimetres (0.079–0.126 in) wide. Both the lower and upper glumes are keelless, obovate and purple in colour, but have different size, apexes and surfaces. The lower glume is 8–12 millimetres (0.31–0.47 in) long with asperulous surface and erosed apex, while the upper glume is 5–9 millimetres (0.20–0.35 in) long and have a puberulous surface, and erosed as well as obtuse apex. Palea itself is lanceolate, have ciliolated keels, with scabrous surface and is 2-veined. Flowers are fleshy, lodicule, oblong, truncate, and are 0.1–0.3 millimetres (0.0039–0.0118 in) long while its anthers are 1–2 millimetres (0.039–0.079 in) long. It fruits are caryopsis and have an additional pericarp.
