= Melica pappiana =

Scientific classification
- Kingdom: Plantae
- Clade: Tracheophytes
- Clade: Angiosperms
- Clade: Monocots
- Clade: Commelinids
- Order: Poales
- Family: Poaceae
- Subfamily: Pooideae
- Genus: Melica
- Species: M. pappiana

Binomial name
- Melica pappiana W.Hempel

Species of grass

Melica pappiana is a species of grass found in China (Jilin and Shanxi). It grows on grassy mountain slopes and larch forests at 500–2,000 metres (1,600–6,600 ft) above sea level.

== Description ==
The species is perennial and have elongated rhizomes with slender culms that are 40–60 centimetres (16–24 in) long. The leaf-sheaths have glabrous surface, are tubular, and are closed on one end. The leaf-blades are 6–15 centimetres (2.4–5.9 in) long and 1–3 millimetres (0.039–0.118 in) wide with the same type of surface and are hairy. The membrane is eciliated, 0.5–1.5 millimetres (0.020–0.059 in) long, and have a ligule. The panicle is equilateral, linear, open, is 5–6 centimetres (2.0–2.4 in) long and carry 3–4 fertile spikelets. The main panicle branches are indistinct and almost racemose.

Spikelets are ovate, solitary and are 7 millimetres (0.28 in) long. They also have fertile spikelets that have filiformed and pubescent pedicels. The pedicels are 4–15 millimetres (0.16–0.59 in) long and are hairy. The spikelets have 2 fertile flores which are diminished at the apex while the sterile florets are barren, clumped and orbicular. Both the upper and lower glumes are keelless, lanceolate, membranous, and purple in colour. They are also have acute apexes but are different in size; Lower glume is 4.5–5.5 millimetres (0.18–0.22 in) long while the upper one is 6.5–7.5 millimetres (0.26–0.30 in) long and is 5-veined. Its palea have ciliolated keels and is 2-veined. Flowers have 3 anthers while the fruits are caryopses and have additional pericarp as well.
