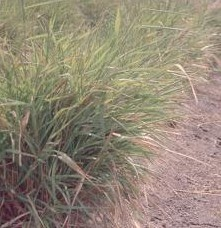

Conservation status
- Secure (NatureServe)

Scientific classification
- Kingdom: Plantae
- Clade: Tracheophytes
- Clade: Angiosperms
- Clade: Monocots
- Clade: Commelinids
- Order: Poales
- Family: Poaceae
- Subfamily: Pooideae
- Genus: Melica
- Species: M. nitens

Binomial name
- Melica nitens (Scribn.) Nutt. ex Piper

Synonyms
- List: Melica diffusa var. nitens Scribn.; Melica scabra Nutt.

= Melica nitens =

Species of grass

Melica nitens is a species of grass known by the common names threeflower melicgrass or three-flowered melic. It is native to the central United States.

== Description ==
This perennial grass has short rhizomes and sometimes forms bunches. The stems grow up to 1.3 meters tall. The inflorescence is a branching panicle of spikelets. The spikelets normally have three perfect flowers in one sided panicles. Despite its name, the grass may also have spikelets with two or four flowers each, often two. The rachilla is longer than the fertile florets, and terminates in a club. The sterile florets are two empty lemmas.

== Habitat ==
In the wild this plant grows in wooded areas, grasslands, streambanks, and roadsides. In some areas it is considered "highly threatened by land-use conversion and habitat fragmentation, and to a lesser extent by forest management practices." In other areas it is cultivated and sown as a forage grass. In the US state of Minnesota, where it reaches its most northerly range in the extreme south eastern part of the state, it is listed as a threatened species; it was historically found in sandy soiled woodlands and prairie. In Wisconsin it is listed as a Special Concern plant, and is found on steep slopes or rocky embankments around the states southern floodplains, mesic forests, and dry prairies.
