= Melica glabrescens =

Scientific classification
- Kingdom: Plantae
- Clade: Tracheophytes
- Clade: Angiosperms
- Clade: Monocots
- Clade: Commelinids
- Order: Poales
- Family: Poaceae
- Subfamily: Pooideae
- Genus: Melica
- Species: M. glabrescens

Binomial name
- Melica glabrescens (Torres) Torres

Species of grass

Melica glabrescens is a species of grass found in Buenos Aires and Río Negro, Argentina.

== Description ==
The species is perennial with short rhizomes and erect culms that are 20–40 centimetres (7.9–15.7 in) long. The leaf-sheaths are scabrous, tubular and closed on one end while the leaf-blades are conduplicate and are 2–3 millimetres (0.079–0.118 in) wide. They also have ciliate margins and rough, scabrous surface. The membrane is eciliated and is 5–7 millimetres (0.20–0.28 in) long. The panicle is open, linear, is 7–11 centimetres (2.8–4.3 in) long with scaberulous axis.

Spikelets are obovate, solitary and have fertile spikelets that are pediceled. The pedicels are filiform, curved, pubescent, and hairy above. The spikelets have 1 fertile floret which is diminished at the apex while the sterile florets are barren, cuneate, clumped and are 1.5–1.7 millimetres (0.059–0.067 in) long. Both the upper and lower glumes are keelless and membranous while the other features are different; Lower glume is obovate, 7–8.5 millimetres (0.28–0.33 in) long and have an erose apex while the upper one is cuneate, 4.5–5.5 millimetres (0.18–0.22 in) long and have obtuse apex.

The species' lemma have ciliated margins that are hairy in the middle. The lemma also have an acute apex and have chartaceous and lanceolated fertile lemma that is 4.5–5 millimetres (0.18–0.20 in) long and 1.8–2 millimetres (0.071–0.079 in) wide. Its palea have ciliolated keels, is 3.5–4 millimetres (0.14–0.16 in) long and have scaberulous surface. Flowers are ciliate, fleshy, and truncate. They also grow together, are 0.2 millimetres (0.0079 in) long and have 3 anthers that are 1–1.3 millimetres (0.039–0.051 in) long. The fruits are 2–2.5 millimetres (0.079–0.098 in) long and are ellipsoid. They also have caryopsis with additional pericarp and linear hilum.

== Ecology ==
Its flowering time is from October to November.
