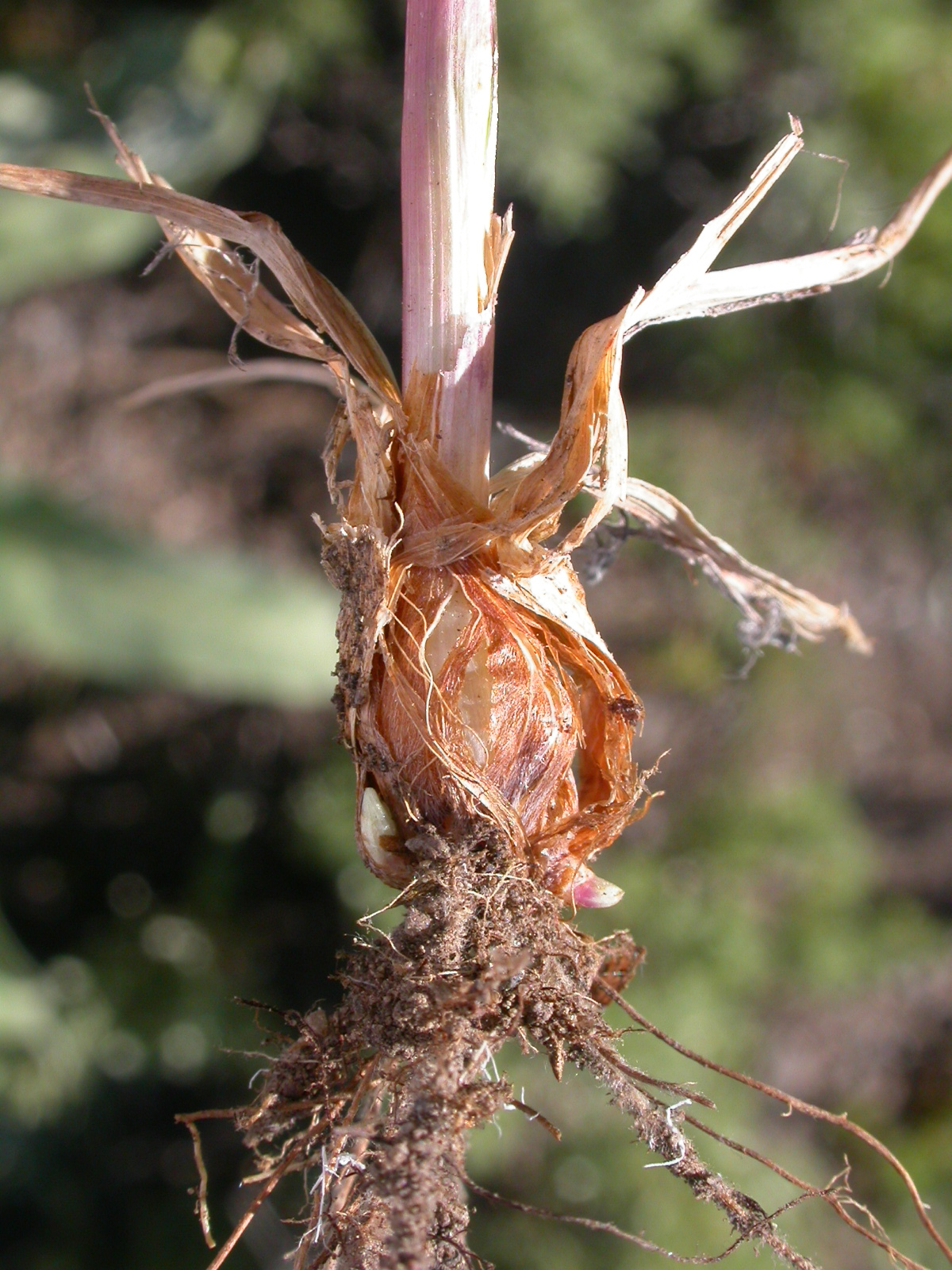

Conservation status
- Secure (NatureServe)

Scientific classification
- Kingdom: Plantae
- Clade: Tracheophytes
- Clade: Angiosperms
- Clade: Monocots
- Clade: Commelinids
- Order: Poales
- Family: Poaceae
- Subfamily: Pooideae
- Genus: Melica
- Species: M. spectabilis

Binomial name
- Melica spectabilis Scribn.

= Melica spectabilis =

Species of flowering plant

Melica spectabilis is a species of grass known by the common names purple oniongrass and showy oniongrass.

== Distribution ==
It is native to western North America from British Columbia to northern California to the Rocky Mountains, where it grows in moist meadows, forests, and other mountainous habitat.

== Description ==
Melica spectabilis is a perennial grass which varies in maximum height from under 10 centimetres (3.9 in) to nearly a meter, growing from rhizomes and stalked, onionlike corms. The inflorescence is a narrow series of spikelets which are green with evenly spaced purple bands.
