= Melica serrana =

Scientific classification
- Kingdom: Plantae
- Clade: Tracheophytes
- Clade: Angiosperms
- Clade: Monocots
- Clade: Commelinids
- Order: Poales
- Family: Poaceae
- Subfamily: Pooideae
- Genus: Melica
- Species: M. serrana

Binomial name
- Melica serrana Muj.-Sall. & M.Marchi

Species of grass

Melica serrana, is a species of grass endemic to Cerro de las Ánimas, Uruguay.

== Description ==
The species is perennial and caespitose, with elongated rhizomes. Its culms are 25–65 centimetres (9.8–25.6 in) long with scabrous leaf-sheaths. It eciliate membrane is 0.5–3 millimetres (0.020–0.118 in) long and is also lacerated and obtuse. The leaf-blades are involute and are 5–15 millimetres (0.20–0.59 in) long by 1–3 millimetres (0.039–0.118 in) wide with its surface being pubescent and hairy.

The panicle itself is lanceolate, open and is 10–22 centimetres (3.9–8.7 in) long. The main panicle branches are whorled and are 6 centimetres (2.4 in) long. Both panicle axis and branches are scaberulous with solitary spikelets. The spikelets themselves are obovate and are 5–8 millimetres (0.20–0.31 in) long. They carry 2 fertile florets which are oblong and 8–15 millimetres (0.31–0.59 in) long. Fertile spikelets are pediceled, the pedicels of which are curved, ciliate and filiform. Florets are diminished at the apex.

Its lemma is pubescent and have hairy veins with asperulous surface. It hairs are 0.7 millimetres (0.028 in) long while fertile lemma is being chartaceous, elliptic, keelless, and is 4.6–5.5 millimetres (0.18–0.22 in) long. The glumes are all keelless but are different in size and texture. Lower glume is obovate and is 6–8 millimetres (0.24–0.31 in) long and 7-9 veined, while the upper one is lanceolate and is 6.5–7.2 millimetres (0.26–0.28 in) long and 5 veined. Lower glume also have an emarginated apex while the upper one have an obtuse one. The upper glumes have glabrous surface as well. Palea is elliptic, 4.5 millimetres (0.18 in) long and is 2-veined. Flowers are fleshy, oblong, truncate, have 2 lodicules, and grow together. They have 3 anthers which are 0.6 millimetres (0.024 in) long which have dark brown coloured fruits that are caryopsis, ellipsoid, and have an additional pericarp with linear hilum. Their fruit length is 2.7–3 millimetres (0.11–0.12 in).

== Ecology ==
Melica serrana is found on elevation of 250 metres (820 ft).
