= Melica arzivencoi =

Scientific classification
- Kingdom: Plantae
- Clade: Tracheophytes
- Clade: Angiosperms
- Clade: Monocots
- Clade: Commelinids
- Order: Poales
- Family: Poaceae
- Subfamily: Pooideae
- Genus: Melica
- Species: M. arzivencoi

Binomial name
- Melica arzivencoi Valls & Barcellos

Species of grass

Melica arzivencoi is a grass species in the family Poaceae that is endemic to Brazil where it can be found in Rio Grande do Sul. It was described by Valls and Barcellos in 1973.

== Description ==
The species is bisexual, cespitose, perennial and is rhizomatous. The culms are 90 centimetres (35 in) long and about 0.6 millimetres (0.024 in) thick. They are also erect, decumbent, and scabrous at the same time. Leaf-sheaths are closed and are both glabrous and scabrous. The leaf-blades on the other hand are acute and are 2–11 centimetres (0.79–4.33 in) long and 1.5–4 millimetres (0.059–0.157 in) wide. They are also flat, linear and have an adaxial bottom which is hispid and tipped. Panicles are erect, narrow and dense. They can either be 6–10 millimetres (0.24–0.39 in) long or 7–8 millimetres (0.28–0.31 in). Branches are 3 centimetres (1.2 in) long and are erect with villous pedicels which are curved as well. Spikelets are 3.5–4 millimetres (0.14–0.16 in) in length but could exceed up to 4.7 millimetres (0.19 in). When young, they are bright violet in colour, and carry 1-2 bisexual florets by maturity. The glumes are acute, glabrous, hyaline, membranous, and lanceolated at the same time and have 3-5 veines. Lemma is lanceolated as well and is 3–3.5 millimetres (0.12–0.14 in) long. Fruits are about 1.5 millimetres (0.059 in) long are 0.6 millimetres (0.024 in) in diameter and obovoid as well.

== Ecology ==
It grows in grassy, woody landscapes, and on rocks at elevations of 2,770 metres (9,090 ft). In some cases they require moisture that should be at 900–1,000 metres (3,000–3,300 ft). Flowers bloom from December to February.
