= Melica virgata =

Scientific classification
- Kingdom: Plantae
- Clade: Tracheophytes
- Clade: Angiosperms
- Clade: Monocots
- Clade: Commelinids
- Order: Poales
- Family: Poaceae
- Subfamily: Pooideae
- Genus: Melica
- Species: M. virgata

Binomial name
- Melica virgata Turczaninow ex Trinius

Species of grass

Melica virgata, is a grass species in the family Poaceae that can be found in China, Mongolia and Russia (Siberia).

== Description ==
The species is perennial and tufted, with wiry culms that are 30–80 centimetres (12–31 in) long and 0.6–1.4 millimetres (0.024–0.055 in) in diameter. Its lemma is elliptic and oblong, lowest one of which is 3–5 millimetres (0.12–0.20 in) long. Low glume is ovate and is 1.5–3.5 millimetres (0.059–0.138 in) long while the upper glume is lanceolate and is 2.5–4.2 millimetres (0.098–0.165 in) long. The species spikelets are ovate to oblong, are purple in colour and are 3.5–6.5 millimetres (0.14–0.26 in). Flowers anthers are 1–1.8 millimetres (0.039–0.071 in) long.

== Ecology ==
It is found on grassy and stony mountain slopes on elevation of 1,000–3,900 metres (3,300–12,800 ft). It blooms from May to July.
