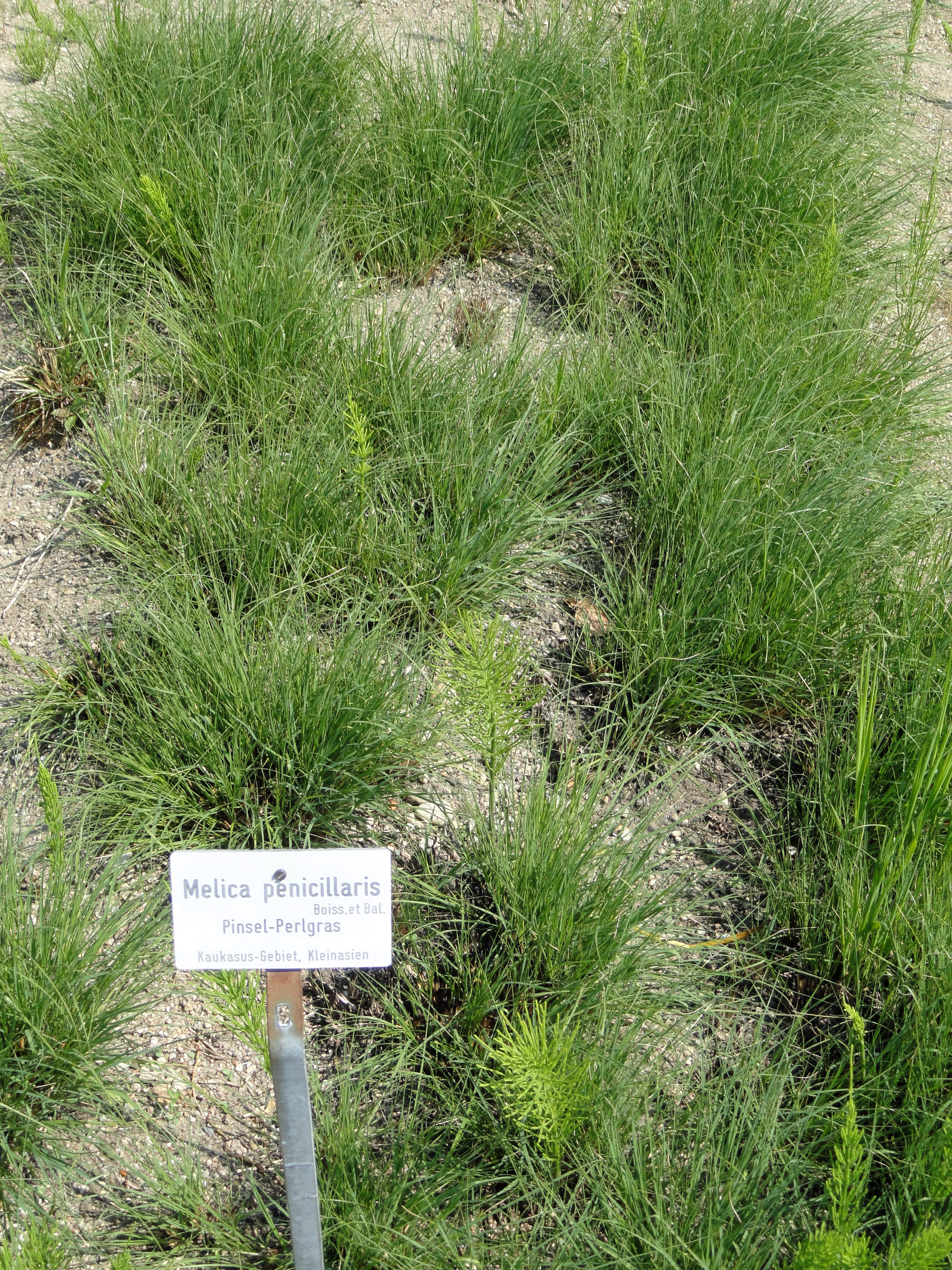
- Melica penicillaris in the Botanischer Garten München-Nymphenburg, Munich, Germany

Scientific classification
- Kingdom: Plantae
- Clade: Embryophytes
- Clade: Tracheophytes
- Clade: Angiosperms
- Clade: Monocots
- Clade: Commelinids
- Order: Poales
- Family: Poaceae
- Subfamily: Pooideae
- Genus: Melica
- Species: M. penicillaris

Binomial name
- Melica penicillaris Boiss. & Balansa

= Melica penicillaris =

Species of plant

Melica penicillaris is a species of grass in the Poaceae family. It is endemic to Inner Anatolia, Turkey, where it grows on bushy hills, rocky slopes, limestone surfaces, and in gullies at 1,000–1,800 metres (3,300–5,900 ft) above sea level.

== Description ==
The species is perennial and caespitose with short rhizomes and 50–100 centimetres (20–39 in) long erect culms. The leaf-sheaths are smooth, tubular and are closed on one end. The leaf-blades are flat and are 10–20 centimetres (3.9–7.9 in) long by 3–12 millimetres (0.12–0.47 in) wide. They also have a rough and scabrous surface. The eciliated margin have a ligule which is 2.5–5 millimetres (0.098–0.197 in) long. The panicle is linear, open, secund, and is 8–22 centimetres (3.1–8.7 in) long by 1.5–3 centimetres (0.59–1.18 in) wide. The main branches of the panicle carry 30–90 fertile spikelets which are oblong, solitary, 9–13 millimetres (0.35–0.51 in) long and are pediceled. Besides the pedicels, the spikelets have 2-4 fertile florets which are diminished at the apex. The species' also have 2–3 sterile florets which are 2 millimetres (0.079 in) long, barren, cuneate, and clumped.

Both the upper and lower glumes are keelless, membranous, oblong and have obtuse apexes. The size is different though; Lower glume is 6–9 millimetres (0.24–0.35 in) long, while the upper one is 8–12 millimetres (0.31–0.47 in) long. Its lemma have pilose surface, obtuse apex and either white or yellow coloured hairs. The fertile lemma is chartaceous, elliptic, keelless, and is 8–10 millimetres (0.31–0.39 in) long. The species' palea have ciliolated keels and is 2-veined. Flowers are fleshy, oblong and truncate. They also grow together, have 2 lodicules and 3 anthers. The fruits have caryopsis with additional pericarp and linear hilum.

== Ecology ==
Melica penicillaris blooms from May to June.
