= Melica brasiliana =

Scientific classification
- Kingdom: Plantae
- Clade: Tracheophytes
- Clade: Angiosperms
- Clade: Monocots
- Clade: Commelinids
- Order: Poales
- Family: Poaceae
- Subfamily: Pooideae
- Genus: Melica
- Species: M. brasiliana

Binomial name
- Melica brasiliana Ard.

Species of grass

Melica brasiliana, is a grass species in the family Poaceae that is endemic to Brazil and southern South America.

== Description ==
The species is perennial with elongated rhizomes. Its culms are 30–60 centimetres (12–24 in) long. Culm-internodes scaberulous with leaf-sheaths are tubular with one of their length being closed. They are also erect and connate. Its eciliate membrane is 2–8 millimetres (0.079–0.315 in) long with leaf-blades being lanceolate, stiff, and are 3–17 millimetres (0.12–0.67 in) long and 3.5–9 millimetres (0.14–0.35 in) wide. They also have scabrous margins with apex. The panicle branches are oblong, scaberulous, and are 8–22 centimetres (3.1–8.7 in) long by 2 centimetres (0.79 in) wide. Its spikelets are obovate, pendulous, solitary and are 11–17 millimetres (0.43–0.67 in) long. Fertile spikelets have hairy, pubescent, curved and filiformed pedicels. Florets are diminished with callus being pubescent as well. The species have a smooth rachilla.

Its lemma have ribbed lateral veins, 0.7–1.2 millimetres (0.028–0.047 in) long hairs and have acute apex. It also has a pilose and scaberulous surface. Fertile lemma is chartaceous, elliptic and is 7–10 millimetres (0.28–0.39 in) long. Sterile floret is 4 millimetres (0.16 in) long and is also barren, cuneate, and is clumped. Lower glumes are obovate and are 11–17 millimetres (0.43–0.67 in) long while the upper glumes are lanceolate and are 8.5–13 millimetres (0.33–0.51 in) long. Both the lower and upper glumes are keelless and chartaceous, but have different apexes. The upper glume apex is obtuse while the lower glumes is acute. They also have purple coloured hyaline margins. Palea have ciliolate keels. Flowers are fleshy, oblong, truncate, are growing together and are 0.4 millimetres (0.016 in) long. Flowers' 3 anthers are 2 millimetres (0.079 in) long with 2 lodicules. Fruits are dark brown in colour, ellipsoid, have an additional pericarp and are 3–3.5 millimetres (0.12–0.14 in) long with linear hilum.
