= Melica riograndensis =

Scientific classification
- Kingdom: Plantae
- Clade: Tracheophytes
- Clade: Angiosperms
- Clade: Monocots
- Clade: Commelinids
- Order: Poales
- Family: Poaceae
- Subfamily: Pooideae
- Genus: Melica
- Species: M. riograndensis

Binomial name
- Melica riograndensis Longhi-Wagner & Valls

Species of grass

Melica riograndensis is a species of grass in the family Poaceae that is endemic to Brazil.

== Description ==
The species is perennial and with short rhizomes and 16–30 centimetres (6.3–11.8 in) long erect culms. The leaf-sheaths are tubular, have one closed end, and are glabrous on surface. The leaf-blades are 12–57 centimetres (4.7–22.4 in) long by 1.3–1.5 millimetres (0.051–0.059 in) wide with its surface being rough and scaberulous. The membrane is eciliated and is 2.5–3.2 millimetres (0.098–0.126 in) long with the panicle being open, linear and 5–8 centimetres (2.0–3.1 in) long. The main panicle branches are indistinct and almost racemose.

Spikelets are oblong, solitary, and have fertile spikelets that have filiformed pedicels. Both the upper and lower glumes are keelless, membranous, with obtuse apexes. Their other features are different though; Lower glume is obovate and is 5.8–6.3 millimetres (0.23–0.25 in) long while their upper one is lanceolate and is 7–9 millimetres (0.28–0.35 in) long.

Its lemma have prominent lateral veins with papillose surface and acute apex. Fertile lemma is chartaceous, keelless lanceolate, and is 7–7.2 millimetres (0.28–0.28 in) long by 2–4 millimetres (0.079–0.157 in) wide. Its palea have dentated apex and papillose surface. The species also carry 2–3 sterile florets which are barren, cuneate, clumped and are 2–3 millimetres (0.079–0.118 in) long. Flowers are fleshy, oblong, truncate, and carry 3 anthers that are 0.7–1.2 millimetres (0.028–0.047 in) long. The species' fruits have caryopsis with additional pericarp.
