= Melica schafkatii =

Scientific classification
- Kingdom: Plantae
- Clade: Tracheophytes
- Clade: Angiosperms
- Clade: Monocots
- Clade: Commelinids
- Order: Poales
- Family: Poaceae
- Subfamily: Pooideae
- Genus: Melica
- Species: M. schafkatii

Binomial name
- Melica schafkatii Bondarenko

Species of grass

Melica schafkatii is a species of grass that can be found in Central Asia.

== Description ==
The species is perennial and have elongated rhizomes. The plant stem is smooth with the culms being 30–100 centimetres (12–39 in) long. The species leaf-sheaths are tubular with one of their length being closed. It eciliate membrane is truncate with its leaf-blades being 10–18 centimetres (3.9–7.1 in) long and 3–10 millimetres (0.12–0.39 in) wide and have acuminated apex.

The panicle itself is contacted, lanceolate and is 8–15 centimetres (3.1–5.9 in) long. The main branches are distant and are 0.5–1 centimetre (0.20–0.39 in) long. The spikelets are elliptic, solitary, 10–15 millimetres (0.39–0.59 in) long, and are made out of 2 fertile florets. Fertile spikelets are pediceled, the pedicels of which are filiform, pubescent and curved. Florets are diminished at the apex.

Its lemma have pilose surface and obtuse apex with fertile lemma being chartaceous, ovate, keelless, and is 7.5–11 millimetres (0.30–0.43 in) long. Both the lower and upper glumes are 6.5–9 millimetres (0.26–0.35 in) long, are keelless, oblong, and 5–7 -veined with obtuse apexes. Palea is 2-veined. Flowers are fleshy, oblong, truncate, have 2 lodicules, and grow together. They have 3 anthers which are 2.5–3.5 millimetres (0.098–0.138 in) long that have fruits which are caryopsis and have an additional pericarp with linear hilum.
