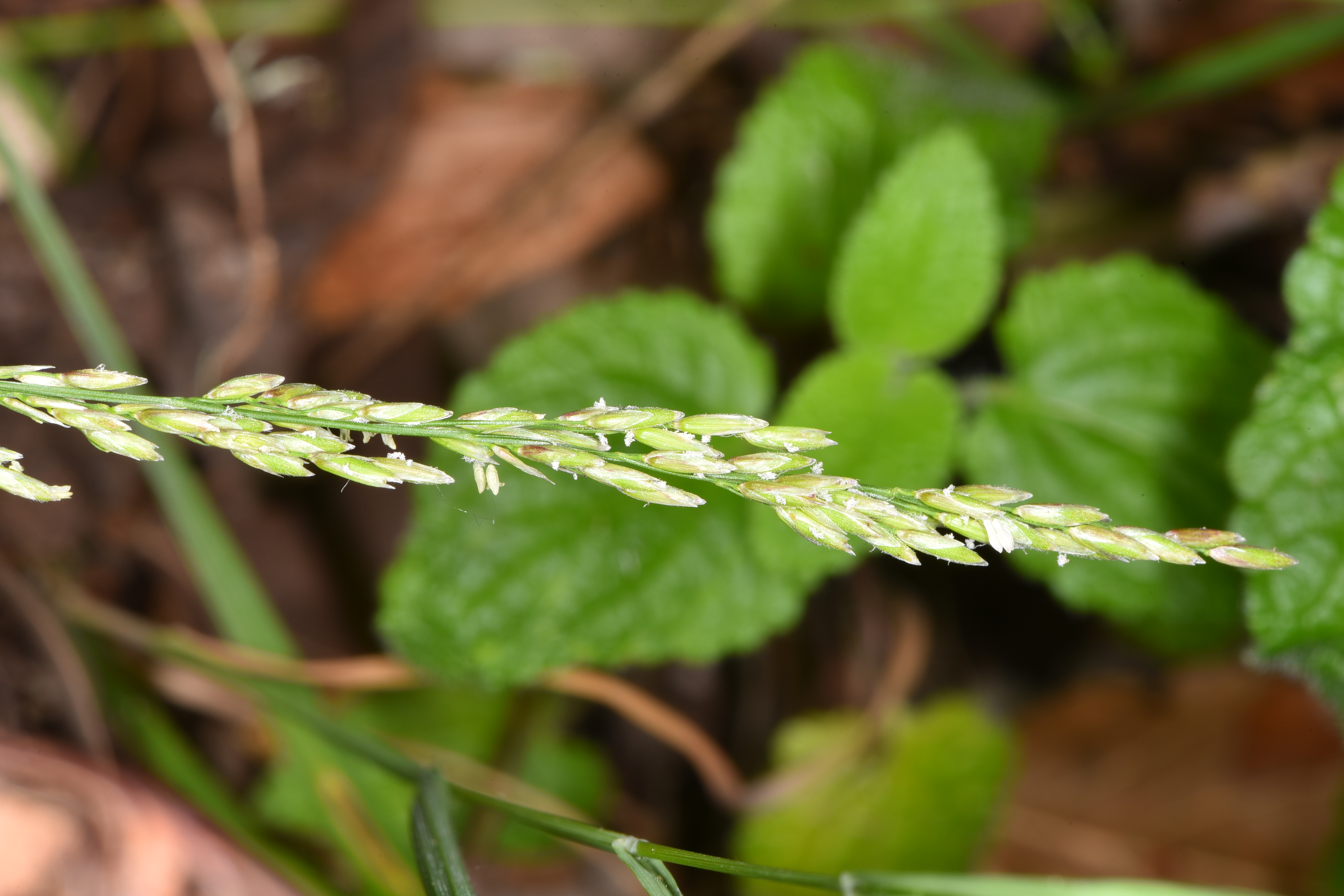

Scientific classification
- Kingdom: Plantae
- Clade: Tracheophytes
- Clade: Angiosperms
- Clade: Monocots
- Clade: Commelinids
- Order: Poales
- Family: Poaceae
- Subfamily: Pooideae
- Genus: Melica
- Species: M. torreyana

Binomial name
- Melica torreyana Scribn.

= Melica torreyana =

Species of flowering plant

Melica torreyana is a species of grass known by the common name Torrey's melicgrass.

== Distribution ==
It is endemic to California, where it grows in chaparral, grassland, and other hillside and mountain habitats in the northern and central sections of the state.

== Description ==
Melica torreyana is a perennial bunchgrass with dense clumps of stems up to a meter-3 feet long. The inflorescence is a narrow panicle of small spikelets each under a centimeter long.
