= Melica schuetzeana =

Scientific classification
- Kingdom: Plantae
- Clade: Tracheophytes
- Clade: Angiosperms
- Clade: Monocots
- Clade: Commelinids
- Order: Poales
- Family: Poaceae
- Subfamily: Pooideae
- Genus: Melica
- Species: M. schuetzeana

Binomial name
- Melica schuetzeana W. Hempel

Species of grass

Melica schuetzeana is a species of grass in the family Poaceae that is found in Bhutan and in the Chinese provinces Qinghai, Sichuan and Yunnan. It was first described in 1972 by Werner Hempel.

== Description ==
The species is perennial and have culms that are 80–110 centimetres (31–43 in) tall by 2–3 millimetres (0.079–0.118 in) wide. Leaves are cauline; leaf sheaths are purple in colour and are longer than the stem while leaf-blades are 15–30 centimetres (5.9–11.8 in) × 3–6 millimetres (0.12–0.24 in) and are stiff with adaxial bottom that is also scaberulous. Its ligule is cylindrical and is 1–4 millimetres (0.039–0.157 in) long. The species' panicle is open and is 35 centimetres (14 in) long with whorled and distant branches. It spikelets are elliptic and are 6–8 millimetres (0.24–0.31 in) long. The glumes are purple in colour with pale green florets that have 2-3 fertile florets. The stem itself is 2 millimetres (0.079 in) with its lemma being elliptic and 5–6.5 millimetres (0.20–0.26 in) long. It is also herbaceous, granular-scaberulous and is 5–7-veined. Both glumes are acute while the size is different; lower glume is 2.8–4 millimetres (0.11–0.16 in) long while the upper one is 4.5–6.5 millimetres (0.18–0.26 in).

== Ecology ==
It is found in forest margins on elevation of 3,200–3,500 metres (10,500–11,500 ft). It blooms from July to August.
