= Melica frutescens =

Scientific classification
- Kingdom: Plantae
- Clade: Tracheophytes
- Clade: Angiosperms
- Clade: Monocots
- Clade: Commelinids
- Order: Poales
- Family: Poaceae
- Subfamily: Pooideae
- Genus: Melica
- Species: M. frutescens

Binomial name
- Melica frutescens Scribn.

Species of grass

Melica frutescens, the woody melicgrass, is a species of grass found in Arizona and California in the United States and in Mexico.

== Description ==
The species is perennial and have culms that are 75–200 centimetres (30–79 in) long and woody. The species' lateral branches are sparse with leaf-sheaths being scabrous, tubular and closed. It leaf-blades are 2–4 millimetres (0.079–0.157 in) wide. It panicle is contracted, linear, and is 12–35 centimetres (4.7–13.8 in) long with filiform pedicels that are located on fertile spikelet. The main branches are appressed and carry oblong and solitary spikelets that are 12–18 millimetres (0.47–0.71 in) long. They are comprised out of 3–6 fertile florets which are diminished at the apex. It sterile florets are barren, oblong, growing in a clump and are 4.5–6.5 millimetres (0.18–0.26 in) long. The species' fertile lemma is chartaceous, keelless, oblong and is 8–11 millimetres (0.31–0.43 in) long. Both lower and upper glumes are chartaceous, elliptic and keelless with acute apexes. Their size is different though; Lower glume is 7–12 millimetres (0.28–0.47 in) long while the upper one is 9–15 millimetres (0.35–0.59 in) long. Flowers are fleshy, oblong, truncate and grow together. They also have 3 anthers with fruits that are caryopses and have an additional pericarp.
