= Melica eremophila =

Scientific classification
- Kingdom: Plantae
- Clade: Tracheophytes
- Clade: Angiosperms
- Clade: Monocots
- Clade: Commelinids
- Order: Poales
- Family: Poaceae
- Subfamily: Pooideae
- Genus: Melica
- Species: M. eremophila

Binomial name
- Melica eremophila Torres

Species of grass

Melica eremophila is a species of grass that is native to South America.

== Description ==
The species is perennial with short rhizomes. It culms are erect and are 20–60 centimetres (7.9–23.6 in) long. The plant stem is smooth while the leaf-sheaths are scabrous, tubular, and are closed on one end. It eciliate membrane is 3–6 millimetres (0.12–0.24 in) long and is pubescent on the surface. The leaf-blades are flat and are glabrous with scabrous surface and ciliated margins. They are 1.5–9 centimetres (0.59–3.54 in) long and 2–3 millimetres (0.079–0.118 in) wide. Panicle is inflorescent and is contracted, linear and is 4–15 centimetres (1.6–5.9 in) long. The main branches are appressed. The panicles have curved, filiform and pubescent pedicels which are hairy above. The spikelets are orbicular, solitary, and are 7–11 millimetres (0.28–0.43 in) long. They are comprised out of 1 fertile floret which is diminished at the apex.

Its lemma have ciliate margins and scabrous surface with obtuse apex. It also have hairs that are 1 millimetre (0.039 in) long while fertile lemma is chartaceous, elliptic, keelless, and is 5–7 millimetres (0.20–0.28 in) long by 2.4–2.5 millimetres (0.094–0.098 in) wide. Both low and upper glumes are membranous and have an obtuse apexes, but are different in size. Also, both glumes have acute apexes. Low glume is 7–11 millimetres (0.28–0.43 in) long, while the upper one is 5–8.5 millimetres (0.20–0.33 in) long. Palea is puberulous, have ciliolate keels and is 4.5–5.5 millimetres (0.18–0.22 in) long. It sterile florets are barren, orbicular, and grow in a clump. Flowers are 0.3 millimetres (0.012 in) long and are fleshy, oblong, truncate and united. They have 3 anthers that are 0.8–1.8 millimetres (0.031–0.071 in) long. The fruits are caryopses, ellipsoid, have an additional pericarp, are 2.5–3.5 millimetres (0.098–0.138 in) long and are dark brown in colour.
