= Melica argyrea =

Scientific classification
- Kingdom: Plantae
- Clade: Tracheophytes
- Clade: Angiosperms
- Clade: Monocots
- Clade: Commelinids
- Order: Poales
- Family: Poaceae
- Subfamily: Pooideae
- Genus: Melica
- Species: M. argyrea

Binomial name
- Melica argyrea Hack.

Species of grass

Melica argyrea is a species of grass found in Argentina, Brazil (Rio Grande do Sul), and Uruguay.

== Description ==
The glumes are 12–70 centimetres (4.7–27.6 in) long and are erect. It has no lateral branches. Leaf-sheaths are tubular for majority of the length and can be scabrous. They are also glabrous or pilose on the bottom and are 2.5–7 millimetres (0.098–0.276 in) in length. Leaf-blades could be either filiform or linear and sometimes even involute or convolute depending on the gender. The leaves themselves are 1–15 centimetres (0.39–5.91 in) long and 1–2 millimetres (0.039–0.079 in) wide. As with leaf-sheaths the leaf-blades are also pilose but hairy sometimes on one side or on both (depending on the gender). The leaf-blade margins are always ciliated. The panicle is open, ovate and is 5–27 centimetres (2.0–10.6 in) long.

The main branches are spread out, with the panicle axis being scabrous just like the branches. Pedicels are curved, filiform, glabrous and have fertile spikelets on them. Spikelets are compressed, obovate and are 5–8 millimetres (0.20–0.31 in) in length. They carry 1 fertile floret which is callus and glabrous. Florets have lanceolated lemma which is 4–5 millimetres (0.16–0.20 in) long and 1.5–2 millimetres (0.059–0.079 in) wide. It is also chartaceous and way thinner above and where margins are.

Lemma hairs 0.5–1 millimetre (0.020–0.039 in) long while it apex is obtuse. It palea is 3.5–4 millimetres (0.14–0.16 in) long and have 2 veines. The palea keels are ciliolate while it surface is scaberulous. Apical florets are 1–1.5 millimetres (0.039–0.059 in) in length and are barren, sterile and have a cuneated clump. Glumes are thinner than fertile lemma and could exceed florets apex. The lower [glume can either be flabellate or obovate and is 5–8 millimetres (0.20–0.31 in) long. It is also 1.4–1.6 millimetres (0.055–0.063 in) length of upper glume and is membranous and thinner above. It is even much thinner on the margins. It has no keels but is 5-7 veined. The apex of the lower glume is erose and obtuse. The upper glume is lanceolated and is 3.5–5 millimetres (0.14–0.20 in) in length. Just like lower glume it doesn't have keels and is membranous, but have veins which are 3-5. The upper apex is either acute or obtuse.

== Ecology ==
Melica argyrea is quite common in grasslands, but is almost rare in the mountains. Flowers bloom from August to November.
