= Melica tibetica =

Scientific classification
- Kingdom: Plantae
- Clade: Tracheophytes
- Clade: Angiosperms
- Clade: Monocots
- Clade: Commelinids
- Order: Poales
- Family: Poaceae
- Subfamily: Pooideae
- Genus: Melica
- Species: M. tibetica

Binomial name
- Melica tibetica Roshev.

Species of grass

Melica tibetica, is a grass species in the family Poaceae that is endemic to China and can be found in such provinces as Inner Mongolia, Qinghai, Sichuan, and Tibetan Autonomous Region.

== Description ==
The species is perennial and caespitose with culms 25–40 cm (9.8–15.7 in) long. The internodes are scaberulous. The leaf-sheaths are tubular and scabrous, closed for part of their length. The 1 mm (0.039 in) ligule is a papery membrane which lacks hairs. The leaf-blades are 8–13 cm (3.1–5.1 in) long and 5 mm (0.20 in) wide. The leaf-blade tip is acuminate. The panicle itself is open and linear, and is 6–12 cm (2.4–4.7 in) long by 1.5 cm (0.59 in) wide. It axis are scabrous with smooth branches.

The spikelets themselves are ovate and are 7–8 mm (0.28–0.31 in) long while the rachilla internodes are 2 mm (0.079 in) long. Fertile spikelets are pediceled, the pedicels of which are filiform and puberulous. The florets are diminished at the apex.

Its fertile lemma is elliptic, scarious and is 5 mm (0.20 in) long while lemma itself is keelless with dentate apex. Glumes are very different. Although both are keelless, the lower glume is oblong and 5 mm (0.20 in) long while the upper one is obovate and is 6–7 mm (0.24–0.28 in) long. Palea have ciliolated keels and is 2-veined. Flowers have 3 anthers which are 1 mm (0.039 in) long. The species' fruits are caryopses, 0.75 mm (0.030 in) in length, and have an additional pericarp with linear hilum.

== Ecology ==
It is found in alpine meadows on elevation of 3,500–4,300 metres (11,500–14,100 ft). It blooms from July to September.
