= Melica yajiangensis =

Scientific classification
- Kingdom: Plantae
- Clade: Tracheophytes
- Clade: Angiosperms
- Clade: Monocots
- Clade: Commelinids
- Order: Poales
- Family: Poaceae
- Subfamily: Pooideae
- Genus: Melica
- Species: M. yajiangensis

Binomial name
- Melica yajiangensis Z.L.Wu

Species of grass

Melica yajiangensis, is a species of grass that is endemic to China.

== Description ==
The species is perennial and caespitose, which is clumped and have absent rhizomes. Its culms are 55–75 centimetres (22–30 in) long and 1–4 millimetres (0.039–0.157 in) in diameter. The species leaf-sheaths are tubular and subequal with one of their length being closed and have a glabrous surface. Its eciliate membrane is 0.3–0.5 millimetres (0.012–0.020 in) long while its leaf-blades are 15–27 millimetres (0.59–1.06 in) long and 2–3 millimetres (0.079–0.118 in) wide. They also have ribbed surface which is also rough and scaberulous as well.

The panicle itself is open and ovate, and is 15–25 centimetres (5.9–9.8 in) long while its divaricate branches are 6–12 centimetres (2.4–4.7 in) long. The panicle branches are capillary and carry distant spikelets. The spikelets themselves are ovate, just like panicles and are 5–8 millimetres (0.20–0.31 in) long and are 8–12 millimetres (0.31–0.47 in) long. Fertile spikelets are pediceled, the pedicels of which are hairy, pubescent, filiform and are 10–20 millimetres (0.39–0.79 in) long. Florets are diminished at the apex.

Its lemma have asperulous surface with fertile lemma being herbaceous, lanceolate, keelless and 4–5 millimetres (0.16–0.20 in) long. Both the lower and upper glumes are keelless, scarious, are 5–8 millimetres (0.20–0.31 in) long, are grey coloured and have acuminated apexes. Palea is ciliolate, have scabrous keels and is 2-veined. Flowers anthers are 1.8–2 millimetres (0.071–0.079 in) long while the fruits are caryopsis and have an additional pericarp.

== Ecology ==
It is found on mountain slopes of Sichuan on elevation of 2,700 metres (8,900 ft). It blooms from August to September.
