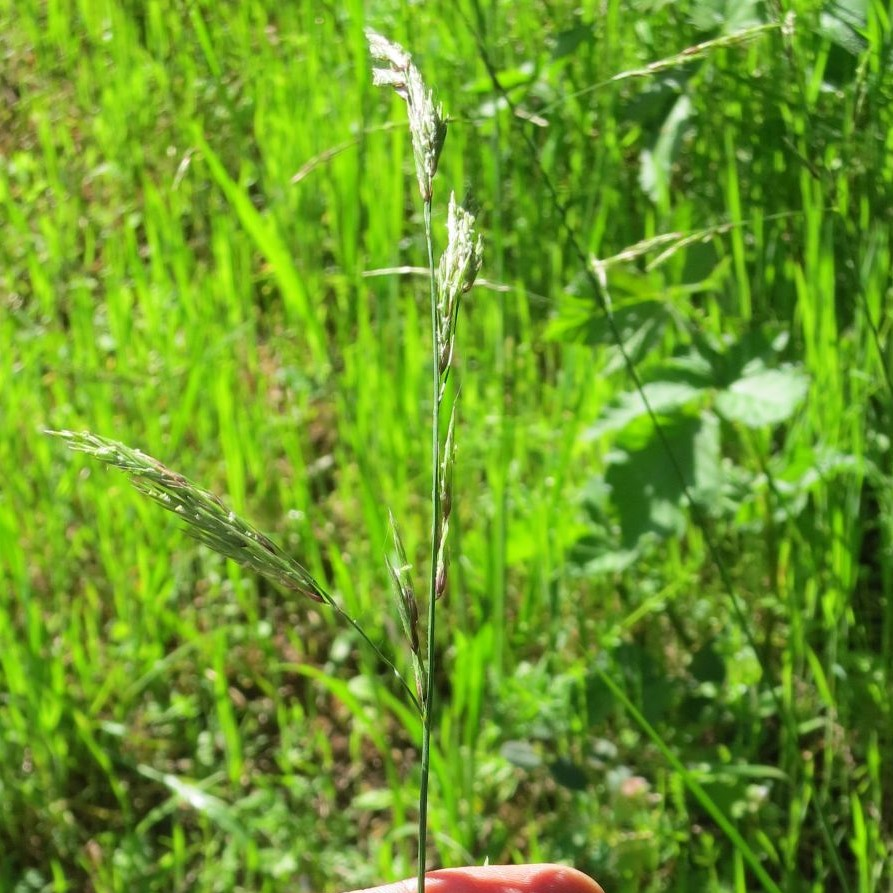

Scientific classification
- Kingdom: Plantae
- Clade: Tracheophytes
- Clade: Angiosperms
- Clade: Monocots
- Clade: Commelinids
- Order: Poales
- Family: Poaceae
- Subfamily: Pooideae
- Genus: Melica
- Species: M. geyeri

Binomial name
- Melica geyeri Munro ex Bol.

= Melica geyeri =

Species of flowering plant

Melica geyeri is a species of grass known by the common name Geyer's oniongrass.

== Distribution ==
Melica geyeri is native to the western United States, where it is found in Oregon and California, including the Sierra Nevada. It grows in many types of habitat, including mountain forests and open hillsides.

== Description ==
Melica geyeri is a rhizomatous perennial grass growing up to 2 meters in maximum height. The base of the stem swells into onionlike corms. The inflorescence is a wide array of long, narrow, pointed spikelets which are green with purple banding.
