= Melica minor =

Scientific classification
- Kingdom: Plantae
- Clade: Embryophytes
- Clade: Tracheophytes
- Clade: Angiosperms
- Clade: Monocots
- Clade: Commelinids
- Order: Poales
- Family: Poaceae
- Subfamily: Pooideae
- Genus: Melica
- Species: M. minor

Binomial name
- Melica minor Hack. ex Boiss.

Synonyms
- Melica subenervis Boiss.

Species of plant

Melica minor is a species of grass in the family Poaceae. It is endemic to Caucasus.

== Description ==
The species is perennial and caespitose with 10–20 centimetres (3.9–7.9 in) long culms. The leaf-sheaths are tubular and are closed on one end with its surface being glabrous. The leaf-blades surface is the same but they are 2–5 centimetres (0.79–1.97 in) long and 1–2 millimetres (0.039–0.079 in) wide. The panicle is open, linear, 4–8 centimetres (1.6–3.1 in) long with smooth axis and have 2 fertile spikelets.

Spikelets are obovate, solitary, 4–6 millimetres (0.16–0.24 in) long and are pediceled. The pedicels are filiform. Besides the pedicels, the spikelets have 2 fertile florets which are diminished at the apex. The sterile florets are also present and are barren, cuneate and clumped. Both the upper and lower glumes are keelless, membranous and oblong with acute apexes. The size is different though; Lower glume is 3.5 millimetres (0.14 in) while the upper one is 4 millimetres (0.16 in) long.

Its lemma have an acute apex with the fertile lemma being chartaceous, keelless, ovate and 4.5 millimetres (0.18 in) long. Its palea is 2-veined. Flowers are fleshy, oblong and truncate with 2 lodicules. They also grow together and have 3 anthers which are 1.5 millimetres (0.059 in) long. The fruits have caryopsis with additional pericarp and have linear hilum.
