= Melica rectiflora =

Scientific classification
- Kingdom: Plantae
- Clade: Embryophytes
- Clade: Tracheophytes
- Clade: Angiosperms
- Clade: Monocots
- Clade: Commelinids
- Order: Poales
- Family: Poaceae
- Subfamily: Pooideae
- Genus: Melica
- Species: M. rectiflora

Binomial name
- Melica rectiflora Boiss. & Heldr.

Synonyms
- Melica rectiflora var. pilosa Papp; Melica rectiflora f. pilosa (Papp) W.Hempel

Species of plant

Melica rectiflora is a species of grass in the family Poaceae. It is native to Greece and Crete.

== Description ==
The species is perennial with short rhizomes and 20–60 centimetres (7.9–23.6 in) long culms. The leaf-sheaths are tubular and are closed on one end with its surface being glabrous. The leaf-blades surface is scaberulous and rough with its size being are 5–20 centimetres (2.0–7.9 in) long by 2–3 millimetres (0.079–0.118 in) wide. Eciliated membrane have a ligule which is truncate. The panicle is contracted, linear, 6–22 centimetres (2.4–8.7 in) long. The main panicle branches are indistinct, scaberulous and are racemose.

Spikelets are oblong, solitary, 4–7 millimetres (0.16–0.28 in) long and have linear pedicels. Besides the pedicels, the spikelets have 1 fertile floret which is diminished at the apex. The sterile florets are 2–3 in number and are 2–3 millimetres (0.079–0.118 in) long, barren, oblong and clumped. Both the upper and lower glumes are keelless, membranous, oblong and are purple coloured. Other features are different though; Lower glume is 3–6 millimetres (0.12–0.24 in) long with an acute apex while the upper one is 4–7 millimetres (0.16–0.28 in) long with an obtuse apex.

Its lemma have smooth surface and an obtuse apex while the fertile lemma is chartaceous, elliptic, keelless, and 5–7 millimetres (0.20–0.28 in) long. Its palea have thick keels and is elliptic and 2-veined. Flowers are fleshy, oblong and truncate with 2 lodicules. They also grow together and have 3 anthers which are 1.5–2.3 millimetres (0.059–0.091 in) long. The fruits have caryopsis with additional pericarp and have linear hilum. They are also ellipsoid and are 3.5 millimetres (0.14 in) long.
