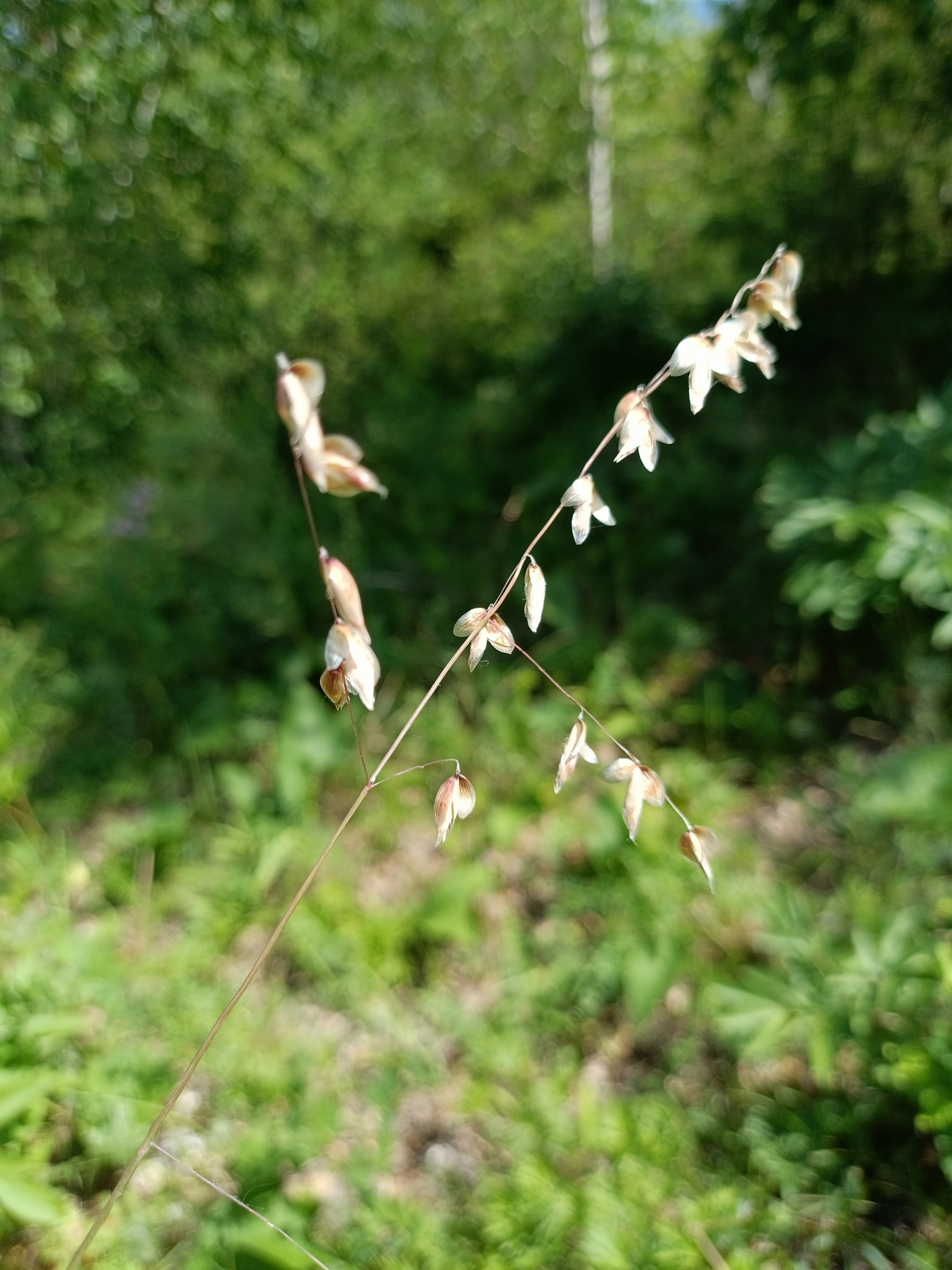

Scientific classification
- Kingdom: Plantae
- Clade: Tracheophytes
- Clade: Angiosperms
- Clade: Monocots
- Clade: Commelinids
- Order: Poales
- Family: Poaceae
- Subfamily: Pooideae
- Genus: Melica
- Species: M. turczaninowiana

Binomial name
- Melica turczaninowiana ohwi

= Melica turczaninowiana =

Species of grass

Melica turczaninowiana, is a species of grass found in Mongolia, North Korea, Russia (Siberia), and China (Hebei, Heilongjiang, Henan, Inner Mongolia, and Shanxi).

== Description ==
The species is perennial and caespitose with caulined leaves. Its culms are 50–80 centimetres (20–31 in) long while its culm-internodes are smooth. The species leaf-sheaths are tubular with one of their length being closed. Its eciliate membrane is 2–4 millimetres (0.079–0.157 in) long and is truncate. Leaf-blades apex is acuminate, while the leaves themselves are 10–18 millimetres (0.39–0.71 in) long and 3–6 millimetres (0.12–0.24 in) wide. They also have scabrous surface which is also pilose and hairy as well. The panicle itself is lanceolate, open, and is 9–18 centimetres (3.5–7.1 in) long by 3.5–6 centimetres (1.4–2.4 in) wide. The panicle branches are capillary with its peduncle being scaberulous above. Its spikelets are elliptic and are 8–12 millimetres (0.31–0.47 in) long. Fertile spikelets are pediceled, the pedicels of which are curved, filiform and are 3–7 millimetres (0.12–0.28 in) long. Florets are diminished.

Its lemma have 3–3.5 millimetres (0.12–0.14 in) long hairs and have villous surface. Fertile lemma is chartaceous, ovate, is 9–11 millimetres (0.35–0.43 in) long and keelless. Sterile floret is barren, ovate, and is clumped. Both the lower and upper glumes are keelless, oblong, are 8–11 millimetres (0.31–0.43 in) long, and have obtuse apexes. Palea have eciliate keels and is 2-veined. Flowers are growing together and have 3 anthers that are 1.5–2 millimetres (0.059–0.079 in) long with 2 lodicules. Fruits are caryopsis, fusiform and have an additional pericarp.

== Ecology ==
Can be found in Betula japonica forests of mountainous regions, meadows and slopes on the elevation of 700–2,700 metres (2,300–8,900 ft). Flowers bloom from June to August.
