= Melica paulsenii =

Scientific classification
- Kingdom: Plantae
- Clade: Tracheophytes
- Clade: Angiosperms
- Clade: Monocots
- Clade: Commelinids
- Order: Poales
- Family: Poaceae
- Subfamily: Pooideae
- Genus: Melica
- Species: M. paulsenii

Binomial name
- Melica paulsenii Phil.

Species of plant

Melica paulsenii is a species of grass endemic to Chile where it grows along the coastal cordillera at 50–700 metres (160–2,300 ft) above sea level.

== Description ==
The species is perennial and caespitose with 200–300 centimetres (79–118 in) long culms. The leaf-sheaths are tubular and are closed on one end with its surface being glabrous. The leaf-blades are 10–20 centimetres (3.9–7.9 in) long and 1.5–3 millimetres (0.059–0.118 in) wide. The surface is scabrous and have glabrous margins. The eciliated margin have a ligule and is also erose and truncate with the size being 0.5–1 millimetre (0.020–0.039 in) long. The panicle is contracted, oblong and is 7–14 centimetres (2.8–5.5 in) long by 2–3 millimetres (0.079–0.118 in) wide. The main branches of the panicle are appressed and are scabrous with the same goes for panicle axis.

Spikelets are lanceolate, solitary, 7–9 millimetres (0.28–0.35 in) long and are pediceled. The pedicels are curved, filiform, pubescent, scabrous, and hairy above. Besides the pedicels, the spikelets have 2 fertile florets which are diminished at the apex. The sterile florets are also present and are 1–2.5 millimetres (0.039–0.098 in) long, barren, elliptic, and clumped. Its rhachilla have an elongated plant stem which goes between the glumes and is 0.3–0.6 millimetres (0.012–0.024 in). Both the upper and lower glumes are keelless, membranous, have asperulous surfaces and acute apexes. The other features are different though; Lower glume is elliptic and is 6–8 millimetres (0.24–0.31 in) long, while the upper one is lanceolate and is 7–8 millimetres (0.28–0.31 in) long.

Its lemma have scaberulous surface with the fertile lemma being chartaceous, keelless, lanceolate and 6–7 millimetres (0.24–0.28 in) long by 1.6–2 millimetres (0.063–0.079 in). Lemma have ciliated margins, dentated apex, and hairs which are 1–1.2 millimetres (0.039–0.047 in) long. Palea itself is 3.5–4.5 millimetres (0.14–0.18 in) long, have ciliolated keels and is 2-veined. Flowers are 0.3 millimetres (0.012 in) long, fleshy, oblong and truncate. They also grow together, have 2 lodicules and 3 anthers which are 1.2–1.8 millimetres (0.047–0.071 in) long. The fruits have caryopsis with additional pericarp and have linear hilum. They are also 2–2.5 millimetres (0.079–0.098 in) long and are dark brown in colour.

== Ecology ==
Melica paulsenii blooms from September to December in provinces from Coquimbo to Santiago.
