= Melica lilloi =

Scientific classification
- Kingdom: Plantae
- Clade: Tracheophytes
- Clade: Angiosperms
- Clade: Monocots
- Clade: Commelinids
- Order: Poales
- Family: Poaceae
- Subfamily: Pooideae
- Genus: Melica
- Species: M. lilloi

Binomial name
- Melica lilloi Bech.

Species of grass

Melica lilloi is a species of grass found in Catamarca and Tucumán provinces of Argentina at 3,200–3,500 metres (10,500–11,500 ft) above sea level.

== Description ==
The species is perennial with short rhizomes. The culms are decumbent and are 30–50 centimetres (12–20 in) long with smooth interlodes. The leaf-sheaths are scabrous, tubular, are closed on one end. The leaf-blades are flat, 8–15 millimetres (0.31–0.59 in) long by 1.5 millimetres (0.059 in) wide and have an acute apex and ciliated margin. Both the leaf-sheaths and leaf-blades have a glabrous surface. The membrane is eciliated and is 1–1.5 millimetres (0.039–0.059 in) long. The panicle is open, linear and is 10–15 centimetres (3.9–5.9 in) long.

Spikelets are elliptic, solitary, are 6.5–8 millimetres (0.26–0.31 in) long and have fertile spikelets that are pediceled. The pedicels are filiform, curved, pubescent, and hairy above. The spikelets have 1-2 fertile florets which is diminished at the apex while the sterile florets are barren, cuneate, and clumped with its floret callus being glabrous. Both the upper and lower glumes are keelless, membranous and have acute apexes. Their other features are different; Lower glume is obovate, 6.3–7.7 millimetres (0.25–0.30 in) long and have an erose apex while the upper one is lanceolate, 6–7.5 millimetres (0.24–0.30 in) long and have obtuse apex.

The species' lemma have scaberulous surface and have emarginated apex as well. Its fertile lemma is chartaceous and lanceolated that is 6–7 millimetres (0.24–0.28 in) long and 2–2.3 millimetres (0.079–0.091 in) wide. Its palea have ciliolated keels, is 4–5 millimetres (0.16–0.20 in) long and have puberulous surface with hairy back. Flowers are fleshy, oblong, truncate and are 0.2–0.3 millimetres (0.0079–0.0118 in) long. They also grow together, and have 3 anthers that are 1.5–1.7 millimetres (0.059–0.067 in) long. The fruits are caryopsis with additional pericarp and linear hilum.

== Ecology ==
Its flowering time is from December to January.
