= Melica hunzikeri =

Scientific classification
- Kingdom: Plantae
- Clade: Tracheophytes
- Clade: Angiosperms
- Clade: Monocots
- Clade: Commelinids
- Order: Poales
- Family: Poaceae
- Subfamily: Pooideae
- Genus: Melica
- Species: M. hunzikeri

Binomial name
- Melica hunzikeri Nicora

Species of grass

Melica hunzikeri is a species of grass that is endemic to southern South America.

== Description ==
The species is perennial with short rhizomes and erect culms which are 50–60 centimetres (20–24 in) long. The leaf-sheaths are tubular and are closed on one end with its surface being glabrous or puberulous. The leaf-blades are glabrous and stiff with scaberulous surface and acuminate apex. They are 10–18 centimetres (3.9–7.1 in) long by 1.5–2.6 millimetres (0.059–0.102 in) wide and have acuminated apex. The membrane is eciliate and is 0.5–0.7 millimetres (0.020–0.028 in) long. The panicle itself is open, lanceolate and is 5–16 centimetres (2.0–6.3 in) long. There are 3–4 branches per panicle which have dominant axis.

Spikelets are cuneate, solitary, 5–6.5 millimetres (0.20–0.26 in) long and have fertile spikelets that are pediceled. The pedicels are curved, filiform, and scaberulous. The spikelets have 2 fertile florets which are diminished at the apex while the sterile florets are barren, lanceolate, clumped and are 1.5 millimetres (0.059 in) long. Both the upper and lower glumes are keelless and membranous, but every other feature is different; Lower glume is flabellate, truncate and is 3.5–4 millimetres (0.14–0.16 in) long with an erose apex. Upper glume is ovate and is 4–4.2 millimetres (0.16–0.17 in) long with an obtuse apex. Its lemma have ciliated margins and truncate apex while the fertile lemma is chartaceous, keelless, obovate and is 4.5 millimetres (0.18 in). Its palea is 2.6 millimetres (0.10 in) long while the rhachilla internodes are 1 millimetre (0.039 in) long. Flowers are 0.2–0.3 millimetres (0.0079–0.0118 in) long, fleshy, oblong and truncate. They also grow together, have 2 lodicules and 3 anthers which are 0.6 millimetres (0.024 in) long. The fruits are caryopses and have an additional pericarp.
