= Melica radula =

Scientific classification
- Kingdom: Plantae
- Clade: Tracheophytes
- Clade: Angiosperms
- Clade: Monocots
- Clade: Commelinids
- Order: Poales
- Family: Poaceae
- Subfamily: Pooideae
- Genus: Melica
- Species: M. radula

Binomial name
- Melica radula Franch.

Species of grass

Melica radula is a species of grass endemic to China (Lea, Jilin, and Shanxi). It grows on grassy mountain slopes and larch forests at 300–1,200 metres (980–3,940 ft) above sea level.

== Description ==
The species is perennial and caespitose with 30–45 centimetres (12–18 in) long by 1–2 millimetres (0.039–0.079 in) wide culms. The leaf-sheaths are scabrous, smooth, tubular, and are closed on one end. The leaf-blades are convolute and are 5–12 centimetres (2.0–4.7 in) long by 0.8–2 millimetres (0.031–0.079 in) wide. The membrane is eciliated, 0.5 millimetres (0.020 in) long, and have a ligule. The panicle is linear, open, is 6–15 centimetres (2.4–5.9 in) long and carry 3–6 fertile spikelets. The main panicle branches are appressed.

Spikelets are ovate, solitary and are 5–8 millimetres (0.20–0.31 in) long. They also have fertile spikelets that are hairy and have filiformed and pubescent pedicels. The spikelets have fertile florets that are diminished at the apex while the sterile florets are barren, clumped and orbicular. Both the upper and lower glumes are keelless, membranous, 4–7 millimetres (0.16–0.28 in) long, and light green in colour. They are also have acute apexes but are different in the amount of veins and other features; Lower glume is 1–3 veined and is ovate while the upper one is only 3–5 veined and is linear.

Its lemma have scabrous and tuberculate surface with an obtuse apex. The fertile lemma is herbaceous, keelless, oblong and 4.5–7 millimetres (0.18–0.28 in) long. Its palea have ciliolated keels and is 2-veined. Flowers have 3 anthers that are 1–2 millimetres (0.039–0.079 in) long while the fruits are caryopsis and have additional pericarp as well.
