= Melica montezumae =

Scientific classification
- Kingdom: Plantae
- Clade: Tracheophytes
- Clade: Angiosperms
- Clade: Monocots
- Clade: Commelinids
- Order: Poales
- Family: Poaceae
- Subfamily: Pooideae
- Genus: Melica
- Species: M. montezumae

Binomial name
- Melica montezumae Piper.

Species of grass

Melica montezumae, Montezuma melicgrass, is a grass species in the family Poaceae that can be found in Texas and Mexico.

== Description ==
The plant is perennial and is caespitose as well. The culms are 50–100 centimetres (20–39 in) long while the leaf-sheaths scaberulous and tubular. Eciliate membrane is 5–10 millimetres (0.20–0.39 in) long. Leaf-blades are either flat or involute and are 2–3 millimetres (0.079–0.118 in) wide. Their panicle is open and is 8–16 centimetres (3.1–6.3 in) in length. The main panicle branches are ascended or spreadout, while spikelets are pendulous and solitary. Fertile spikelets have filiformed pedicels, are cuneate and are 7–8 millimetres (0.28–0.31 in) long. They have 1 fertile floret which is diminished. Fertile lemma is chartaceous and elliptic and is 6–7 millimetres (0.24–0.28 in) long. Palea is 2 veined and have scaberulous keels as well. Sterile florets are barren, cuneated, and grow in a clump. Both upper and lower glumes are oblong, scarious and keelless, but the lower one is 7–8 millimetres (0.28–0.31 in) in length while the upper one is 6–7 millimetres (0.24–0.28 in) long. Flowers are fleshy, oblong, truncate, and are growing side by side with 3 anthers. Fruits are caryopsis and have additional pericarp.

== Ecology ==
Melica montezumae grows in shady places in the mountains.
