= Melica porteri =

Scientific classification
- Kingdom: Plantae
- Clade: Tracheophytes
- Clade: Angiosperms
- Clade: Monocots
- Clade: Commelinids
- Order: Poales
- Family: Poaceae
- Subfamily: Pooideae
- Genus: Melica
- Species: M. porteri

Binomial name
- Melica porteri Scribn.

Species of grass

Melica porteri, known as Porter's melicgrass, is a species of grass that grows in the United States and Mexico. In the US it is found in Arizona, Colorado, Kansas, New Mexico, Texas, Utah, and Iowa.

== Description ==
The species is perennial and caespitose, which is clumped as well. It have short rhizomes with slender culms that are 50–100 centimetres (20–39 in) long. The species' leaf-sheaths are tubular, scaberulous and smooth with one of their length being closed. It eciliate membrane is 3–7 millimetres (0.12–0.28 in) long and have a glabrous surface that is also pubescent. Just like eciliate membrane, the surface of leaf-sheaths is glabrous as well. It leaf-blades are 2–5 millimetres (0.079–0.197 in) wide and have either smooth or scaberulous surface.

The panicle itself is nodding, open and linear, and is 13–25 centimetres (5.1–9.8 in) long. The main panicle branches are appressed while spikelets are deflexed and solitary. The spikelets are made out of 4–5 fertile florets which are oblong and 8–15 millimetres (0.31–0.59 in) long. Fertile spikelets are pediceled, the pedicels of which are filiform. Florets are diminished at the apex and are bisexual.

Its lemma have rugulose surface and obtuse apex while fertile lemma is being coriaceous, elliptic, keelless, and is 6–8 millimetres (0.24–0.31 in) long. Both the lower and upper glumes are oblong, keelless, scarious, and are 4–8 millimetres (0.16–0.31 in) long. Their size is different; Lower glume is 2.7–4 millimetres (0.11–0.16 in) long while the upper one is 3–4.5 millimetres (0.12–0.18 in) long. Palea have ciliolated keels and is 2-veined. Flowers are fleshy, oblong, truncate, have 2 lodicules, and grow together. They have 3 anthers which are 2 millimetres (0.079 in) long which have fruits that are caryopsis, 2–3 millimetres (0.079–0.118 in) long and have an additional pericarp with linear hilum.

== Ecology ==
Melica porteri can be found growing on rocky slopes, in open woods, and often near streams.
