= Melica secunda =

Scientific classification
- Kingdom: Plantae
- Clade: Tracheophytes
- Clade: Angiosperms
- Clade: Monocots
- Clade: Commelinids
- Order: Poales
- Family: Poaceae
- Subfamily: Pooideae
- Genus: Melica
- Species: M. secunda

Binomial name
- Melica secunda Regel

Species of grass

Melica secunda, is a species of grass that can be found in China (Gansu, Sichuan, Xinjiang, Xizang), Afghanistan, and Kashmir.

== Description ==
The species is perennial and tufted, with creeping rhizomes. It culms are 40–80 centimetres (16–31 in) long and 1–2 millimetres (0.039–0.079 in) wide while it leaf-sheaths are smooth and glabrous. Leaf-blades are flat and are 12–18 centimetres (4.7–7.1 in) long by 1.5–3 millimetres (0.059–0.118 in) wide. Branches are erect and are 2 millimetres (0.079 in) long. It have cylindrical ligule which is 35–55 millimetres (1.4–2.2 in) long with it spikelets being broadly ovate and 7–8 millimetres (0.28–0.31 in) long. The species have 3 fertile florets which are separated by plant stems each of which is about 2 millimetres (0.079 in) long. It glumes are broadly elliptic, subacute, and are hyline on the margins and at the tip. The lower glume is 5.5 millimetres (0.22 in) long while the upper is 6–6.5 millimetres (0.24–0.26 in) long. The species' lemma of fertile floret elliptic to oblong and is 5–5.5 millimetres (0.20–0.22 in) long. Lemma is also obtuse or subacute, 7-nerved, hairless and scaberulous. The species' anthers are 1.1–1.5 millimetres (0.043–0.059 in) long.

== Ecology ==
Melica secunda was collected only one time in Kashmir while in Afghanistan the description of which was given by Aitchison as being common there, is found on elevation of 3,000 metres (9,800 ft). The flowers bloom from May to August.
