= Melica kozlovii =

Scientific classification
- Kingdom: Plantae
- Clade: Tracheophytes
- Clade: Angiosperms
- Clade: Monocots
- Clade: Commelinids
- Order: Poales
- Family: Poaceae
- Subfamily: Pooideae
- Genus: Melica
- Species: M. kozlovii

Binomial name
- Melica kozlovii Tzvelev

Species of grass

Melica kozlovii is a species of grass found on mountain slopes in Mongolia and China (Gansu, Qinghai, Shanxi) at 2,000–3,900 metres (6,600–12,800 ft) above sea level.

== Description ==
The species is perennial loosely tufted with short rhizomes. The culms are as tall as 20–60 centimetres (7.9–23.6 in) and are 1 millimetre (0.039 in) wide. Sometimes, the culms can be as long as 30 centimetres (12 in), with the species themselves being caespitose and clumped. Both the leaf-sheaths and plant stem is scabrous. The leaf-sheaths are also tubular and are closed on one end. The leaf-blades are flat, 0.8–2.7 millimetres (0.031–0.106 in) wide and have a scaberulous surface. The membrane is truncate just like the leaf-sheaths but is eciliated and 0.5–3 millimetres (0.020–0.118 in) long. The panicle is open, linear, secund, 6–16 centimetres (2.4–6.3 in) long and carry some spikelets. The main branches carry 1–5 fertile spikelets and are scaberulous.

Spikelets are oblong, solitary, are 6.8–8.3 millimetres (0.27–0.33 in) long and have fertile spikelets that are pediceled. The pedicels are pubescent and hairy above. The spikelets have 2-3 fertile florets which are diminished at the apex while the sterile florets are barren, cuneate, and clumped. Both the upper and lower glumes are elliptic, keelless, membranous and have acute apexes. Their size and veines are different though; Lower glume is 5.5–7 millimetres (0.22–0.28 in) long with the leaf veins being 3–5 while the upper one is 7–8.2 millimetres (0.28–0.32 in) long and is 5–9 veined.

The species' lemma have scabrous surface and emarginated apex. Its fertile lemma is coriaceous and is 6–8 millimetres (0.24–0.31 in) long. Its palea is elliptic, 2 veined, and have puberulous surface. Flowers are fleshy, oblong and truncate. They also grow together, and have 3 anthers that are 1.2–1.8 millimetres (0.047–0.071 in) long. The fruits are caryopsis with additional pericarp and linear hilum.

== Ecology ==
Its flowering time is from May to August with its fruits being ripe by that time as well.
