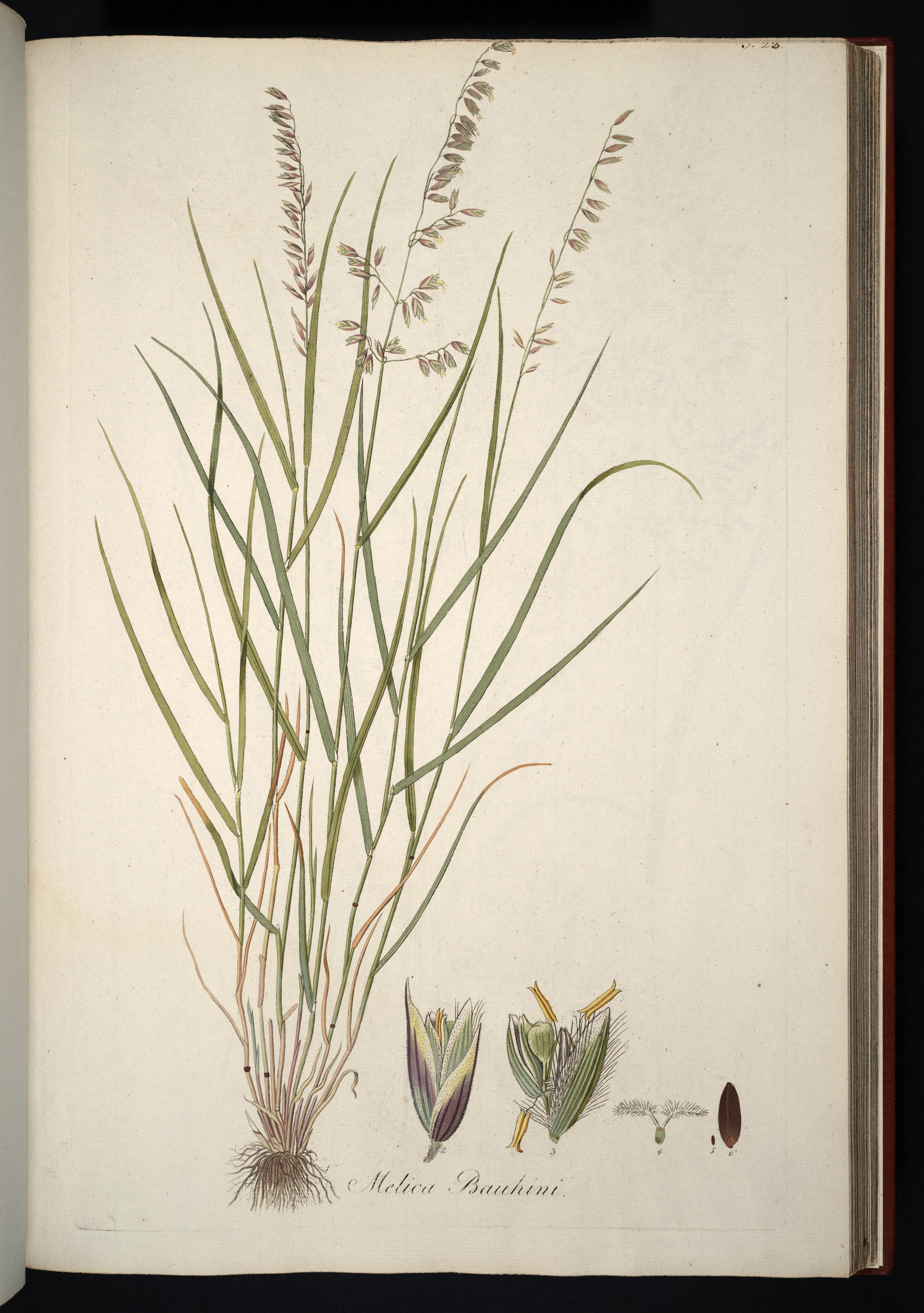

Scientific classification
- Kingdom: Plantae
- Clade: Tracheophytes
- Clade: Angiosperms
- Clade: Monocots
- Clade: Commelinids
- Order: Poales
- Family: Poaceae
- Subfamily: Pooideae
- Genus: Melica
- Species: M. amethystina

Binomial name
- Melica amethystina Pourr.

= Melica amethystina =

Species of grass

Melica amethystina is a grass species in the family Poaceae that can be found in southern Europe.

== Description ==
The species rhizomes are elongated with elected culmes which are 50–100 centimetres (20–39 in) long. The leaf-sheaths are tubular while leaf-blades are convolute or flat, stiff, and are 5–15 centimetres (2.0–5.9 in) long and 1–3 millimetres (0.039–0.118 in) wide. It also has scabrous bottom which can also be glabrous or pilose. The panicle is continuous, contracted, linear, and is 4–20 centimetres (1.6–7.9 in) long. The main panicle branches are indistinct and almost racemose. Spikelets are solitary with fertile spikelets being pedicelled, pedicels of which are filiform and puberulous. They also have 2 fertile florets which are diminished at the apex and which are also cuneated and are 8–10 millimetres (0.31–0.39 in) long.

Glumes are reaching the apex of florets and are thinner than lemma. Lemma margins are ciliate and hairy on the bottom with obtuse apex. It has 2-veined palea with ciliolated keels. The sterile florets are barren, oblong, grow in clump of 2–3, and are 1.5 millimetres (0.059 in) long. The lower glume is ovate, is 6–8 millimetres (0.24–0.31 in) long and is 0.7–0.8 millimetres (0.028–0.031 in) longer than upper glume. The upper glume is as ovate as the lower one and is 8–10 millimetres (0.31–0.39 in) long. Both glumes are membranous, are purple in colour, have no keels, and are 5-veined. The apex of the upper glume is either acute or acuminate. Flowers have 3 stamens. Fruits are caryopses with an added pericarp and linear hilum.
