= Melica animarum =

Scientific classification
- Kingdom: Plantae
- Clade: Tracheophytes
- Clade: Angiosperms
- Clade: Monocots
- Clade: Commelinids
- Order: Poales
- Family: Poaceae
- Subfamily: Pooideae
- Genus: Melica
- Species: M. animarum

Binomial name
- Melica animarum Muj.-Sall. & M.Marchi

Species of grass

Melica animarum is a species of grass that is endemic to Sierra de las Ánimas in Uruguay.

== Description ==
The species have elongated rhizomes and erect culms which are 25 centimetres (9.8 in) long. The leaf-blades are 9–10 centimetres (3.5–3.9 in) long and 2–2.8 millimetres (0.079–0.110 in) wide while their bottom is rough and scabrous. Their apex is acute and their margins are ciliated. It also has lacerated membrane which is 0.2–0.8 millimetres (0.0079–0.0315 in) long. The panicle is contracted, linear, 7–10 centimetres (2.8–3.9 in) long and 1–1.5 centimetres (0.39–0.59 in) wide. The main panicle branches are whorled and are 5 centimetres (2.0 in) long with scabrous axis.

Spikelets are solitary and obovate with fertile spikelets being pedicelled, pedicels of which are ciliated, curved, and filiform. The spikelets have two fertile florets which are diminished at the apex. Both spikelets and lower glumes are 6–7.7 millimetres (0.24–0.30 in) long. The upper glume is emarginated, lanceolated, membranous, is 6–7 millimetres (0.24–0.28 in) long and 1.2 length of the top fertile lemma. Lemma is elliptic and have hairs which are 1–1.2 millimetres (0.039–0.047 in) in length, while it margins are pilose. The bottom of the upper glume is scabrous while the lower glume bottom is either asperulous or smooth with a rough top. The lower glume by itself is elliptic just like lemma, with an erose apex.

The species palea is elliptic too, is 4.8–5 millimetres (0.19–0.20 in) long and have 2 veines. Paleas keels are ciliated and adorned. Flowers are fleshy, oblong, truncate, and grow together. They have 3 anthers each of which is 1.1–1.2 millimetres (0.043–0.047 in) long.

== Ecology ==
Melica animarum can be found growing in dark soils and in stones. The flowers bloom only in November.
