= Melica bocquetii =

Scientific classification
- Kingdom: Plantae
- Clade: Tracheophytes
- Clade: Angiosperms
- Clade: Monocots
- Clade: Commelinids
- Order: Poales
- Family: Poaceae
- Subfamily: Pooideae
- Genus: Melica
- Species: M. bocquetii

Binomial name
- Melica bocquetii Talavera

Species of grass

Melica bocquetii, is a species of grass in the family Poaceae that is endemic to the Subbaetic mountains of southern Spain.

== Description ==
The species is perennial and caespitose with elongated rhizomes. Its culms are 20–60 centimetres (7.9–23.6 in) long. Culm-internodes scaberulous with leaf-sheaths are scabrous and tubular with one of their length being closed. It eciliate membrane is 1–4 millimetres (0.039–0.157 in) long and is lacerate. Leaf-blades being convolute, and are 11–12 millimetres (0.43–0.47 in) long and 0.7–1 millimetre (0.028–0.039 in) wide. They also have scaberulous surface which is also puberulous and hairy as well. The panicle branches are oblong, scaberulous, and are 8–22 centimetres (3.1–8.7 in) long by 2 centimetres (0.79 in) wide. Its spikelets are obovate, pendulous, solitary and are 11–17 millimetres (0.43–0.67 in) long. Fertile spikelets have hairy, pubescent, curved and filiformed pedicels. Florets are diminished with callus being pubescent as well. The species have a smooth rachilla.

Its lemma have 3–3.5 millimetres (0.12–0.14 in) long hairs and have villous surface. Fertile lemma is chartaceous, lanceolate and is 4–4.5 millimetres (0.16–0.18 in) long. Sterile floret is also barren, cuneate, and is clumped. Both the lower and upper glumes are keelless, lanceolate, and have attenuate apexes, but have different surfaces. The upper glume is 5.5–6.2 millimetres (0.22–0.24 in) long with pilose surface, while the lower glumes is 5–7 millimetres (0.20–0.28 in) long and is puberulous on the bottom. Palea is elliptic and is 3.5 millimetres (0.14 in) long and have 2 veines with puberulous surface. Flowers are growing together and have 3 anthers that are 1.5 millimetres (0.059 in) long with 2 lodicules. Fruits are fusiform and have an additional pericarp.
