= Melica bonariensis =

Scientific classification
- Kingdom: Plantae
- Clade: Tracheophytes
- Clade: Angiosperms
- Clade: Monocots
- Clade: Commelinids
- Order: Poales
- Family: Poaceae
- Subfamily: Pooideae
- Genus: Melica
- Species: M. bonariensis

Binomial name
- Melica bonariensis Parodi

Species of grass

Melica bonariensis is a species of grass endemic to Argentina where it can be found in such provinces as Buenos Aires (Bahía Blanca), La Pampa, and Rio Negro.

== Description ==
The species is perennial with short rhizomes. Its culms are erect and are 40–70 centimetres (16–28 in) long. Culm-internodes scaberulous with leaf-sheaths are tubular with one of their length being closed. They are also erect and connate. Its eciliate membrane is 6–12 millimetres (0.24–0.47 in) long with leaf-blades being 5–15 millimetres (0.20–0.59 in) long and 1–2.5 millimetres (0.039–0.098 in) wide. They also have scabrous bottom, are pubescent and hairy. The panicle is linear and is 20–30 centimetres (7.9–11.8 in) long. The main panicle branches are smooth and appressed. Its spikelets are orbicular, solitary and are 4–7.5 millimetres (0.16–0.30 in) long. Fertile spikelets have hairy, pubescent, curved and filiformed pedicels. Florets are diminished with callus being pubescent as well. The species are bisexual and have a scabrous rachilla.

Margins of lemma are ciliate. The lemma itself though is 1–1.5 millimetres (0.039–0.059 in) long hairs and have acute apex. Fertile lemma is chartaceous, lanceolate and is 4–4.5 millimetres (0.16–0.18 in) long. Palea is 3.5–4.5 millimetres (0.14–0.18 in) long, have ciliolated keels which are 2-veined, and asperulous surface. Sterile floret is 1–1.3 millimetres (0.039–0.051 in) long and is also barren, cuneate, and is clumped. Lower glumes are orbicular and are 4–7.5 millimetres (0.16–0.30 in) long while the upper glumes are lanceolate and are 4–5.5 millimetres (0.16–0.22 in) long. Both the lower and upper glumes are keelless but have different apexes. The upper glume apex is erose and obtuse while the lower glumes is acute. Flowers are fleshy, oblong, truncate, are growing together and are 0.2 millimetres (0.0079 in) long. Flowers' 3 anthers are 0.6–1 millimetre (0.024–0.039 in) long with 2 lodicules. Fruits are dark brown in colour, ellipsoid, have an additional pericarp and are 2–2.4 millimetres (0.079–0.094 in) long with linear hilum.

== Ecology ==
Melica bonariensis can be found in the grassy steppes of the southern part of La Pampa, east of Rio Negro and southwest of the Buenos Aires. It blooms from the end of August to mid September.
