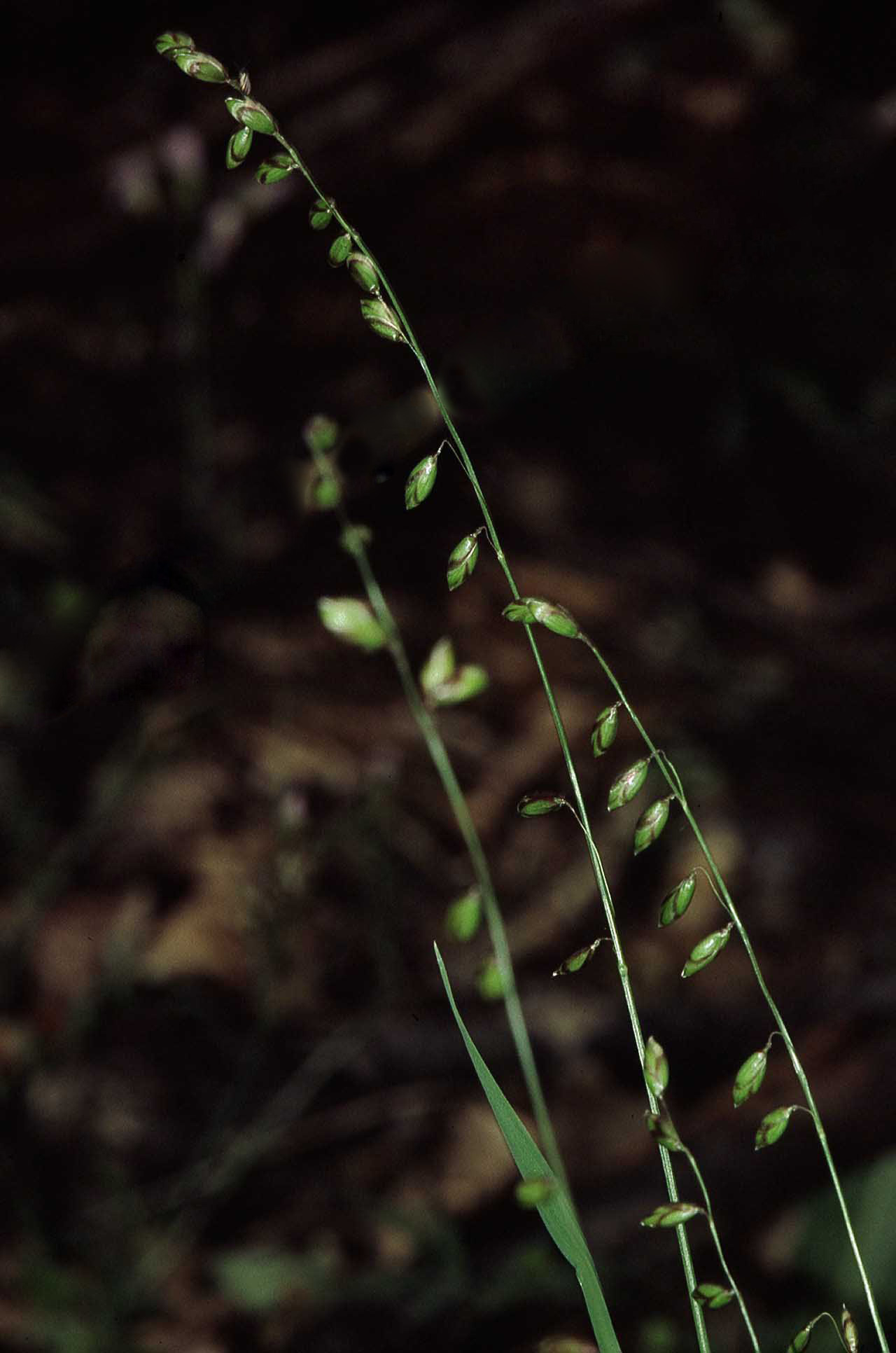

Scientific classification
- Kingdom: Plantae
- Clade: Tracheophytes
- Clade: Angiosperms
- Clade: Monocots
- Clade: Commelinids
- Order: Poales
- Family: Poaceae
- Subfamily: Pooideae
- Genus: Melica
- Species: M. picta

Binomial name
- Melica picta K. Koch

Synonyms
- Melica nutans var. pictaz (K.Koch) Griseb.; Melica picta f. pilosa Papp; Melica viridiflora Czern.

= Melica picta =

Species of grass

Melica picta is a species of grass in the family Poaceae that can be found in Europe, northwestern Africa and southwestern Asia.

== Description ==
The species is cespitose and perennial with the culms being 40–80 centimetres (16–31 in) long. Leaf-sheaths are closed, tubular and scabrous with eciliate membrane being 1–2.5 millimetres (0.039–0.098 in) long. The leaf-blades are pilose and rough. They are also hairy and have scabrous margins and surface with acuminate apex. The length of a leaf-blade is 8–16 centimetres (3.1–6.3 in) long and 2–5 millimetres (0.079–0.197 in) wide. Their panicle is linear, open, secund and is 6–12 centimetres (2.4–4.7 in) in length. They can either be 6–10 millimetres (0.24–0.39 in) long or 7–8 millimetres (0.28–0.31 in). Branches have fertile spikelets which are pediceled and are solitary as well.

Spikelets are 8–10 millimetres (0.31–0.39 in) in length and are oblong. They also have fertile florets which are diminished at the apex. Both lower and upper glumes are elliptic, are 7 millimetres (0.28 in) long, and either gray or red in colour. Both are also keelless and 5-veined with obtuse apex. Lemma is chartaceous, elliptic, and is 3–3.5 millimetres (0.12–0.14 in) long. It is also shiny and keelless but have 3 veines. The lemmas apex is obtuse just like glumes, with palea being 2-veined, lanceolated, and 5–5.5 millimetres (0.20–0.22 in) in length. Flowers are fleshy, oblong, truncate and grow side by side, with 3 anthers. Fruits are caryopsis, have adherent pericarp and are 2 millimetres (0.079 in) long.

== Ecology ==
Melica picta is rare in hardwood and fir forests and is also uncommon on clay and loamy soils. Flowers bloom from May to June.
