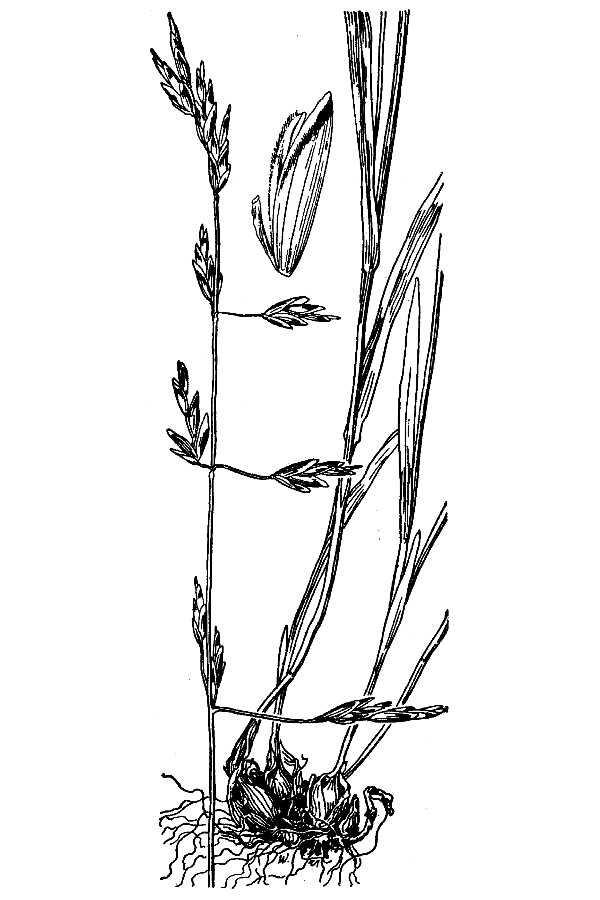

Scientific classification
- Kingdom: Plantae
- Clade: Tracheophytes
- Clade: Angiosperms
- Clade: Monocots
- Clade: Commelinids
- Order: Poales
- Family: Poaceae
- Subfamily: Pooideae
- Genus: Melica
- Species: M. fugax

Binomial name
- Melica fugax Bol.

= Melica fugax =

Species of flowering plant

Melica fugax is a species of grass known by the common names little oniongrass and little melic. It is native to western North America where it usually grows in volcanic soils in forest and plateau habitat from British Columbia to the Sierra Nevada and North California Coast Ranges in California.

Melica fugax is a perennial bunchgrass growing up to 60 centimeters tall. The stems have clusters of onionlike corms at the bases similar to oniongrass (Melica bulbosa). The inflorescence is a narrow or spreading series of spikelets.
