= Melica macra =

Scientific classification
- Kingdom: Plantae
- Clade: Tracheophytes
- Clade: Angiosperms
- Clade: Monocots
- Clade: Commelinids
- Order: Poales
- Family: Poaceae
- Subfamily: Pooideae
- Genus: Melica
- Species: M. macra

Binomial name
- Melica macra Nees

Species of grass

Melica macra is a species of grass that can be found in Argentina, Brazil, and Uruguay.

== Description ==
The species is bisexual with closed leaf-sheaths and have short rhizomes with culms that are 20–100 centimetres (7.9–39.4 in) tall. It panicle is 10–15 centimetres (3.9–5.9 in) long and is linear. Its rachis and branches are scabrous while the ligule is 0.2–0.3 millimetres (0.0079–0.0118 in) long and is membranous. The glumes are lanceolate, papery and membranous on borders, with difference in size; Lower glume is 5.5–10 millimetres (0.22–0.39 in) long by 2.5–3.5 millimetres (0.098–0.138 in) wide while the upper one is 6.5–10 millimetres (0.26–0.39 in) long by 2–3 millimetres (0.079–0.118 in) wide.

== Distribution ==
In Argentina, it is found in such provinces as Buenos Aires, Catamarca, Corrientes, Entre Rios, Formosa, La Pampa, Misiones, Santiago del Estero, Tucumán, San Luis, and Santa Fe.
