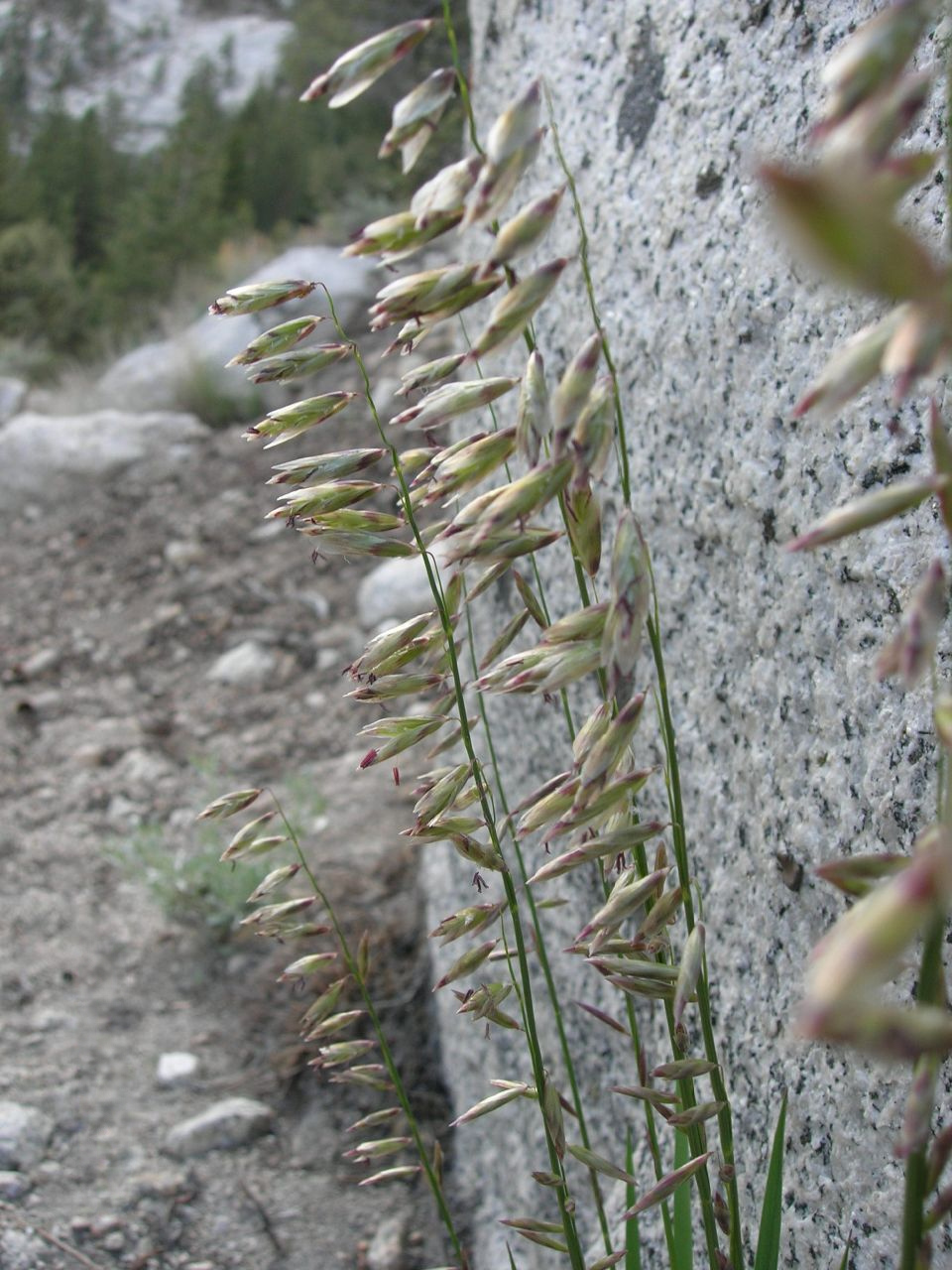

Scientific classification
- Kingdom: Plantae
- Clade: Embryophytes
- Clade: Tracheophytes
- Clade: Spermatophytes
- Clade: Angiosperms
- Clade: Monocots
- Clade: Commelinids
- Order: Poales
- Family: Poaceae
- Subfamily: Pooideae
- Genus: Melica
- Species: M. stricta

Binomial name
- Melica stricta Bol.

= Melica stricta =

Species of flowering plant

Melica stricta is a species of grass known by the common name rock melic.

== Distribution ==
It is native to California, Oregon, Nevada, and Utah in the western United States. It grows in mountain and plateau habitats, including areas with an alpine climate.

== Description ==
It is a perennial bunchgrass which varies in maximum height from 10 to 90 centimeters. The inflorescence is a narrow panicle of V-shaped green and purple banded spikelets.
