= Melica longiligulata =

Scientific classification
- Kingdom: Plantae
- Clade: Tracheophytes
- Clade: Angiosperms
- Clade: Monocots
- Clade: Commelinids
- Order: Poales
- Family: Poaceae
- Subfamily: Pooideae
- Genus: Melica
- Species: M. longiligulata

Binomial name
- Melica longiligulata Z.L.Wu

Species of grass

Melica longiligulata is a species of grass endemic to the Sichuan province of China.

== Description ==
The species is perennial and caespitose with elongated rhizomes and 30–60 centimetres (12–24 in) long by 0.7–1 millimetre (0.028–0.039 in) wide culms. The leaves themselves are cauline while leaf-sheath butt is purple coloured. The leaf-sheaths are tubular and are closed on one end. The eciliate membrane have a ligule that is 3.5 millimetres (0.14 in) long and is lacerate. The leaf-blades are flat and are 8–20 centimetres (3.1–7.9 in) long by 2–2.5 millimetres (0.079–0.098 in) wide. The surface of a leaf-blade is ribbed and is rough as well. The panicle is open, lanceolate, is 10–18 centimetres (3.9–7.1 in) long. The main panicle branches are ascending and are 6 centimetres (2.4 in) long.

Spikelets are ovate, solitary, 5–7 millimetres (0.20–0.28 in) long and have some fertile spikelets that are pediceled. The pedicels are filiform, pubescent and hairy above. The spikelets have 2-3 fertile flores which are diminished at the apex while the sterile florets are not present. Both the upper and lower glumes are keelless, scarious, purple coloured, and have acute apexes. Their other features are different though; Lower glume is oblong and is 3–3.7 millimetres (0.12–0.15 in) long while the upper one is elliptic and is 4–5.5 millimetres (0.16–0.22 in) long.

The species' lemma have an obtuse apex and asperulous surface. Fertile lemma is herbaceous, lanceolate, is 4.3–5 millimetres (0.17–0.20 in) long and is light green in colour. Its palea have ciliolated keels and is 2-veined. Flowers have 3 anthers that are 2 millimetres (0.079 in) long. The fruits have caryopsis and additional pericarp.

== Ecology ==
Melica longiligulata can be found growing on mountain slopes and among shrubs, on the elevation of 3,300–3,400 metres (10,800–11,200 ft). Its blooms only in July.
