= Racoleus =

Scientific classification
- Kingdom: Fungi
- Division: Ascomycota
- Class: Dothideomycetes
- Order: Capnodiales
- Family: incertae sedis
- Genus: Racoleus; R.Sant. & D.Hawksw. (2011)

Type species
- Racoleus trichophorus R.Sant. & D.Hawksw. (2011)

Species
- R. trichophorus R. japonicus

Genus of lichens

Racoleus is a genus of two species of lichen-forming fungi of uncertain familial placement in the order Capnodiales. Both species of Racoleus are filamentous lichens with Trentepohlia (a genus of green algae) as the photobiont partner. The lichens form thalli in the form of felt-like, blackish-brown cushions that grow under shaded conditions on siliceous rocks.

== Taxonomy ==
The genus was circumscribed by the lichenologists Rolf Santesson and David Leslie Hawksworth in 2011. The name Racoleus is derived by combining elements from two other genera: 'Rac' from Racodium and 'coleus' from Cystocoleus. This naming reflects the genus's shared characteristics with both Racodium and Cystocoleus, which are also filamentous lichens. The authors placed the genus in the order Capnodiales because of morphological characteristics. Racoleus was monotypic until 2023, when a second species was added to the genus. Molecular phylogenetic analysis suggests that the new species belongs to the family Teratosphaeriaceae, but DNA sequences of the type species, R. trichophorus, were not available for analysis.

== Description ==
Racoleus is characterised by a superficial, fluffy, and filamentous thallus, which typically presents a brown colour. This genus has a unique relationship with its photobiont, Trentepohlia, a type of green algae. In this symbiotic relationship, individual Trentepohlia filaments are completely encased by fungal hyphae, which are the filament-like structures of the fungus.

The structure of Racoleus is complex, with its filaments ranging from slightly upright (suberect) to spreading out across the surface (decumbent or spreading). These filaments have a branching pattern known as sympodial, where new growth emerges from the side of an older growth. The outer walls of these filaments are distinctive, with an undulating and irregularly corrugated texture, adorned with numerous spiny projections.

The fungal hyphae that envelop the algal filament form a single layer. These hyphae are oriented vertically and run parallel to the axis of the algal filament. They are brown in colour and are marked by thick, uneven walls that are corrugated but not ornamented. The spines that emerge from these filaments are notable for their stiffness, thickness, and smooth, unadorned surfaces. They protrude at angles ranging from broadly acute to almost right angles relative to the vertical axis of the filament.

As for reproductive structures, specific details about the conidiogenous cells (cells that produce conidia, a type of asexual fungal spore) and the conidia themselves are not well established or known for Racoleus.

== Habitat and distribution ==
The reported tropical localities of Racoleus trichophorus – Africa (Ivory Coast), Asia (China), and South America (Peru) – suggest that it could have a pantropical distribution. It is often found growing on the thalli of whitish crustose lichens (including Dichosporidium brunnthaleri, D. nigrocinctum, and Pyrgillus indicus), but is not considered to be lichenicolous (lichen-dwelling), as the contact between them seems to be superficial. Racoleus japonicus occurs in subboreal to temperate regions of Japan, where it grows on shaded rocks and rock walls.
