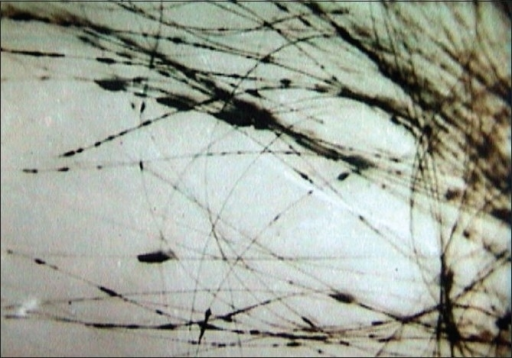
- Black piedra nodules on hair

Scientific classification
- Kingdom: Fungi
- Division: Ascomycota
- Class: Dothideomycetes
- Order: Capnodiales
- Family: Piedraiaceae
- Genus: Piedraia
- Species: P. hortae

Binomial name
- Piedraia hortae (Brumpt) Fonseca & Leão (1928)

Synonyms
- Geotrichum brocqii; Geotrichum brocquii (Beintema) Castell. & Jacono (1933); Parendomyces brocquii Beintema (1933); Proteomyces brocqii; Proteomyces brocquii (Beintema) C.W. Dodge (1935); Piedraia javanica Boedijn & Verbunt (1938); Piedraia malayi Green & Mankikar (1950); Piedraia sarmentoi M.J.Pereira (1929); Piedraia surinamensis C.W.Dodge (1935); Piedraia venezuelensis Brumpt & Langeron (1934); Trichosporon brocquii (Beintema) Nann. (1934); Trichosporon guayo Delamare & Gatti (1928); Trichosporon hortae Brumpt (1913); Trichosporon sarmentoi (M.J. Pereira) Nann. (1934); Trichosporon venezuelensis (Beintema) C.W. Dodge (1935)

= Piedraia hortae =

Species of fungus

Piedraia hortae is a superficial fungus that exists in the soils of tropical and subtropical environments and affects both sexes of all ages. The fungus grows very slowly, forming dark hyphae, which contain chlamydoconidia cells and black colonies when grown on agar. Piedraia hortae is a dermatophyte and causes a superficial fungal infection known as black piedra, which causes the formation of black nodules on the hair shaft and leads to progressive weakening of the hair. The infection usually infects hairs on the scalp and beard, but other varieties tend to grow on pubic hairs. The infection is usually treated with cutting or shaving of the hair and followed by the application of anti-fungal and topical agents. The fungus is used for cosmetic purposes to darken hair in some societies as a symbol of attractiveness.

== Morphology ==
When grown on agar at 25 °C (77 °F) Piedraia hortae grows very slowly to form black-greenish, limited and pointed colonies. Piedraia hortae taken from infected hairs have dark brown nodules, which are made up of ascostroma. The nodules have a gritty feel, organized in a stromatic fashion and have a high concentration of chitin and melanoid pigments. The colonies produce a red pigment and remain smooth and covered with short aerial hyphae. Microscopically, P. hortae produces short, dark hyphae containing thick-walled resting cells. The ascomata consist of irregularly shaped pseudothecia that are black in colour. Each ascoma contains a single ascus containing eight ascospores. The ascospores are dark, curved and become very narrow at the ends forming whip-like appendages. Affected hairs develop stone-like black nodules affixed to the hair shaft that cause weakness of the hair. Infected hairs treated with potassium hydroxide fluoresce under ultraviolet light despite that the fungus itself does not normally fluoresce. Fluorescence of the piedra indicates secondary contamination by bacteria. Identification is easily achieved by microscopic examination of the hair nodules, and can be confirmed by sequence analysis of the nuclear ribosomal internal transcribed spacer region.

== Pathology ==
Black piedra
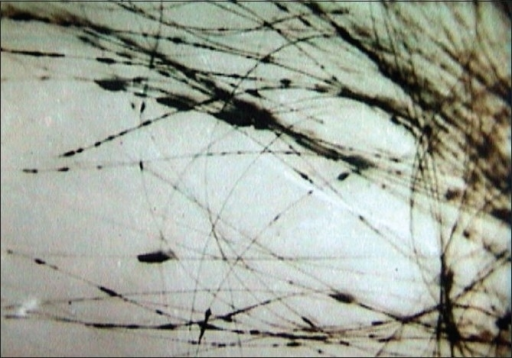
- Black piedra nodules on hair

Piedraia hortae causes the formation of nodules on the hair shaft, a clinical superficial disease commonly known as black piedra. Black piedra is usually seen in tropical regions and it usually targets humans of all ages and targets the scalp, moustache and occasionally pubic hair. The source of the infection is usually in soils, poor hygiene, long hair, cultural use of veils and the application of plant oils to wet hair favours the growth of the infection. Black piedra is a superficial fungal infection, which means that it is restricted to the stratum corneum and causes no inflammation. The infection of the hair shaft results in the formation of nodules on the scalp, moustache and pubic hair. The nodules are hard and gritty, which produce a metallic sound when the hair is combed. The nodules colonize the hair shaft, which causes progressive weakness of the hair and leads to breakage of the hair in severe cases, which can lead to hair loss and baldness. The fungus also has the potential to destroy the cuticular layers of the hair and move into the cortex. Piedraia hortae survives in the scalp is due to the slow rate of the keratin degradation near the cortex and the compact formation of the nodules and the hyphae are tightly packed in black piedra cases. The initial invasion of human hair by P. hortae is achieved by using an eroding hyphae, which force their way beneath or between the cuticular layer. The force applied between or beneath the hair cuticle arises from the growth of the fungus itself. The breakdown of keratin is mainly due to enzymatic processes and corresponds to the abundance of localized mitochondria. The breakdown of keratin begins with the cementing material and progresses to the cortex of the hair shaft. In the cortex two types of degradative patterns are produced which are either parallel or vertical to the axis hair shaft. The parallel pattern arises from hyphal separation of the external cortical layers. The vertical pattern is produced by direct hyphal penetration which creates channels that increase in size as the cortex degrades.

=== Treatment ===
The infection cannot easily be removed mechanically, although further proliferation of infection can be achieved by avoidance of moisture. Removal generally involves cutting or shaving of the hair, but chemical treatments may be similarly useful. For women some individuals use a fine comb to remove as much of the infection as possible and then they cut or shave their hair. This is then followed by the application of a sublimate solution in 60% alcohol solution to the scalp. Historical treatments have used alcoholic tinctures of heavy metals, such as mercury bichloride. The application of antifungal shampoos such as pyrithione zinc, formaldehyde and salicylic acid is effective against black piedra. Oral therapy with itraconazole or terbinafine also causes nodules to break down over time. Removal of affected hair and treatment with topical agents is also effective and results in very low recurrences rates. However, even in the absence of treatment, spontaneous remission may occur.

Terbinafine has been used in the treatment.

=== Cosmetic uses ===
Black piedra is sometimes cultivated for cosmetic purposes due to social factors that favour a specific hair colour, which makes them more attractive in their society. Several Indian tribes located from Panama have been known to use several methods in order to darken the hair of albino individuals within their community. One of these methods is the cultivation of black piedra for an extensive period of time in the individuals hair. In Malaysia the nodules of black piedra are very attractive and women are encouraged to sleep with their hair buried in the soil to encourage growth of the black nodules.

== Similar taxa ==
The genus Piedraia contains another species known as Piedraia quintanilhae, which is more common in chimpanzees than humans. It differs from P. hortae in terms of the ascospores do not have any attachments. Another species known as Trichosporon biegelii is commonly known to cause white piedra . White piedra is more common in temperate and semitropical climates, such as South America, Asia, Europe, Japan, and parts of the southern United States. Black piedra usually affects scalp hair, whereas white piedra is more commonly found in pubic hair, axillary hair, beards, moustaches, and eyelashes. White piedra affects horses and monkeys, in addition to humans and the nodules are white and brown in colour and can be easily detached from the hair shaft. White piedra is treated by using topical and antifungal agents, but a more effective approach is to use itraconazole therapy. Recent studies have shown that the black, lichen-colonizing fungus, Xanthoriicola physciae, is closely related to P. hortae.

== See also ==
- White piedra
- Piedra
