= Antennulariella lichenisata =

Scientific classification
- Kingdom: Fungi
- Division: Ascomycota
- Class: Dothideomycetes
- Order: Capnodiales
- Family: Antennulariellaceae
- Genus: Antennulariella
- Species: A. lichenisata

Binomial name
- Antennulariella lichenisata Coppins & Aptroot (2008)

Species of lichen

Antennulariella lichenisata is a species of lichen in the family Antennulariellaceae. This inconspicuous lichen forms thin, pale pink to pinkish-grey films on tree bark and is easily overlooked due to its resemblance to non-lichenised sooty moulds. It represents a taxonomically significant discovery as the first formally described lichenised member of the order Capnodiales, a fungal group previously thought to be entirely non-lichenised. The species is known from scattered locations across western Britain and northern Ireland, where it grows on the dry, acidic bark of mature deciduous trees in humid woodland environments.

== Taxonomy ==
Antennulariella lichenisata is a minute, bark-dwelling lichen described as new to science in 2008 by Brian J. Coppins and André Aptroot while preparing updates to The Lichens of the British Isles. The holotype was collected by Francis Rose in West Sussex (Iping, St Cuthman's School) on oak in 1974. The species was placed in Antennulariella (order Capnodiales; family Antennulariellaceae) on account of its small, black, hairy fruiting bodies and associated characters; it represents the first lichenised member of the Capnodiales to be formally described.

== Description ==
The thallus of A. lichenisata is extremely thin and easy to overlook, forming a faint, pale pink to pinkish-grey film on bark. The algal partner is Trentepohlia-like and forms short, upright filaments; these may give the thallus a subtle pink cast. The overall appearance can resemble a non-lichenised sooty mould, but the fungus is consistently associated with the algae and forms a delimited patch on the substrate.

Sexual fruiting bodies (ascomata) are minute (about 50–75 μm in diameter), black, globose and sessile, with a covering of short black hairs; an opening (ostiole) is present but the internal supportive tissue (hamathecium) is essentially absent. The asci (spore sacs) are bitunicate, eight-spored and pyriform. Spores are colourless, one-septate (with a single cross-wall), narrowly club-shaped with the upper cell shorter and broader, typically 13–16 × 2.5–3.5 μm. No asexual propagules were observed, and no lichen substances were detected by chemical tests.

Epibryon kondratyuki is somewhat similar in morphology to A. lichenisata, but has shorter ascospores (7–13 μm), narrower asci (7–10 μm).

== Habitat and distribution ==
The species grows on dry, acid bark of mature trees—especially Betula and Quercus, but also Alnus, Corylus and Fraxinus. Records are from humid woods (often with a high water table or near streams) and parkland. It appears to be a poor competitor and typically occurs without close associates. Known records are from western Britain, from south-west England north to Wester Ross in Scotland, extending east to West Sussex in the south, with additional finds in northern Ireland; it is probably overlooked elsewhere.
