= Antennulariella =

Scientific classification
- Domain: Eukaryota
- Kingdom: Fungi
- Division: Ascomycota
- Class: Dothideomycetes
- Order: Capnodiales
- Family: Antennulariellaceae
- Genus: Antennulariella; Woron. (1915)

Type species
- Antennulariella fuliginosa Woron. (1915)

Species
- A. alpina A. batistae A. concinna A. fuliginosa A. lichenisata

Synonyms
- Capnodium subgen. Capnodina Sacc. (1913); Capnodina (Sacc.) Trotter (1926); Capnociferria Bat. (1963); Capnocrinum Bat. & Cif. (1963)

Genus of lichen-forming fungi

Antennulariella is a genus of fungi in the family Antennulariellaceae. First described in 1915, species in the genus form thin, crust-like films that cling directly to rock or bark surfaces and fade imperceptibly into their surroundings. The fungi are distinguished by their distinctive black reproductive structures covered in short hairs, and they appear to rely solely on spores for reproduction since no asexual structures have been observed.

== Taxonomy ==
The genus was circumscribed in 1915 by the Russian mycologist Nikolai Nikolaevich Woronichin, with Antennulariella fuliginosa assigned as the type species.

== Description ==
Antennulariella forms an thin, crust-like film that clings directly to the surface of rock or bark and fades imperceptibly into its surroundings, so no rind-like margin or dark prothallus develops. In most species the fungal layer envelops a pale-brown filamentous alga of the genus Trentepohlia that stands more or less at right angles to the substrate; unusually, the type species lacks an obvious photobiont and may live largely on atmospheric moisture and nutrients. The thallus contains no detectable lichen products according to thin-layer chromatography.

Black, flask-shaped fruit bodies (perithecia) punctuate the surface and are easy to recognise under a hand lens because they are clothed in short, stiff hairs. Internally they are remarkably open: the interwoven network of sterile threads (hamathecium) that normally supports the spore sacs is either completely absent or reduced to a few loose cells, leaving a spacious cavity. The asci themselves are pear-shaped, have a double wall (bitunicate) and show no blue staining reaction in iodine solutions, indicating that the usual amyloid layer is missing. Each ascus releases eight colourless, club-shaped ascospores that are divided once by a cross wall (1-septate) before dispersal. No asexual reproductive structures (conidiomata) have been reported, so the species appear to rely solely on these spores for propagation.

== Species ==
As of July 2025, Species Fungorum (in the Catalogue of Life) accept five species of Antennulariella:

- Antennulariella alpina (W.B.Cooke) M.E.Barr (1987)
- Antennulariella batistae S.Hughes (2000)
- Antennulariella concinna (L.R.Fraser) S.Hughes (1976)
- Antennulariella fuliginosa Woron. (1915)
- Antennulariella lichenisata Coppins & Aptroot (2008)
