= Trichothallus =

Scientific classification
- Domain: Eukaryota
- Kingdom: Fungi
- Division: Ascomycota
- Class: Dothideomycetes
- Order: Capnodiales
- Family: Euantennariaceae
- Genus: Trichothallus; F.Stevens (1925)

Type species
- Trichothallus hawaiiensis F.Stevens (1925)

Species of mould

Trichothallus is a genus of mould which can live on plants, smothering them and inhibiting photosynthesis. This form of growth, referred to as trichothallic, can be paralleled in certain brown algae (Phaeophyta) where development is restricted to specific, well-defined regions such as at or near the base of the filament. The genus was circumscribed by the mycologist Frank Lincoln Stevens in 1925.

== Taxonomy ==
Trichothallus contains the following species:

- Trichothallus hawaiiensis
- Trichothallus niger
