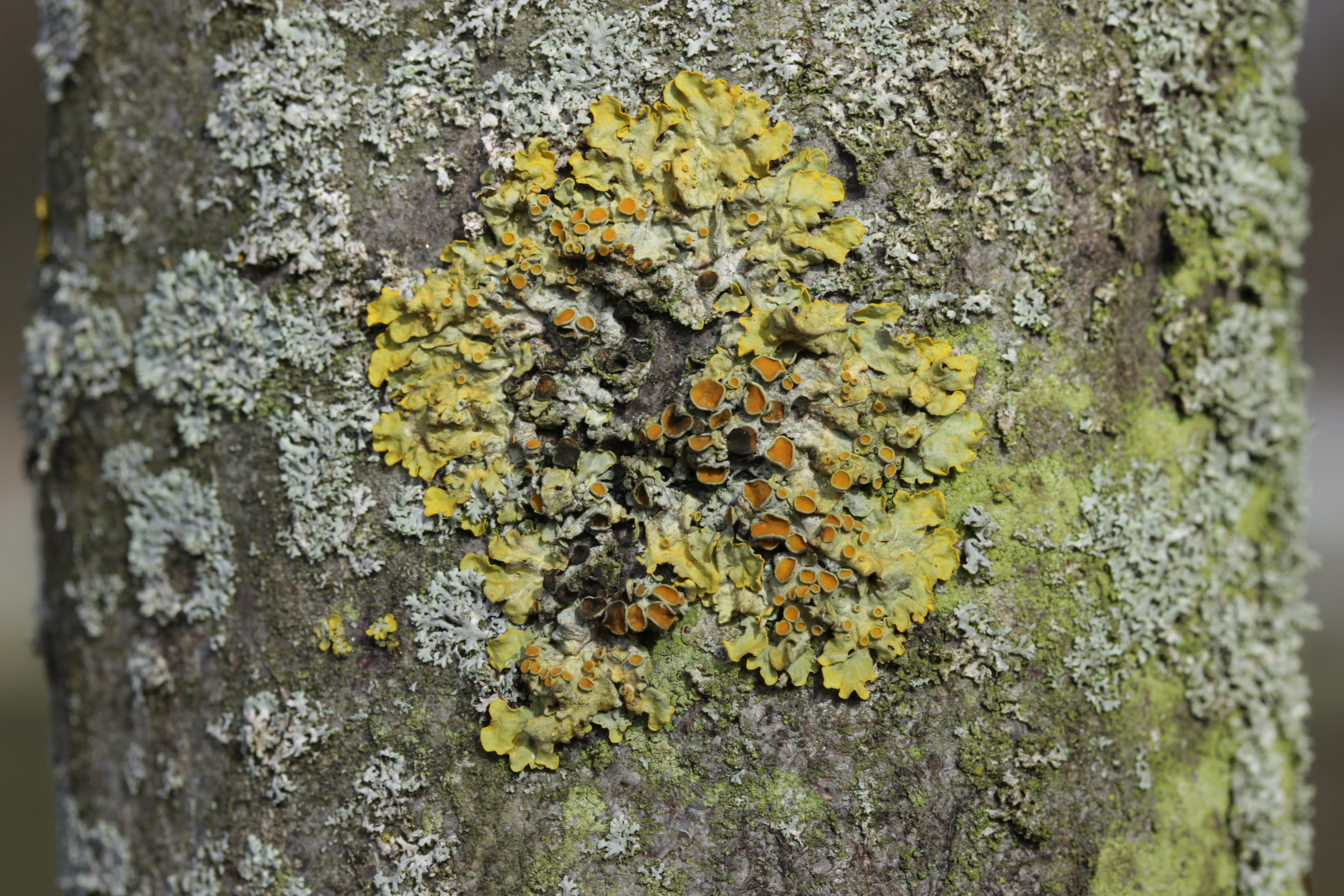
- Xanthoriicola physciae parasitizing its host, Xanthoria parietina

Scientific classification
- Domain: Eukaryota
- Kingdom: Fungi
- Division: Ascomycota
- Class: Dothideomycetes
- Order: Capnodiales
- Family: Teratosphaeriaceae
- Genus: Xanthoriicola; D.Hawksw. (1973)
- Species: X. physciae

Binomial name
- Xanthoriicola physciae (Kalchbr.) D.Hawksw. (1973)

Synonyms
- Gymnosporium physciae Kalchbr. (1865); Coniosporium physciae (Kalchbr.) Sacc. (1886)

= Xanthoriicola =

Single-species fungal genus

Xanthoriicola is a fungal genus in the family Teratosphaeriaceae. It is a monospecific genus, containing the single species Xanthoriicola physciae, a lichenicolous (lichen-dwelling) fungus that grows exclusively on the fruiting bodies of the common orange lichen Xanthoria parietina. The fungus infects the reproductive structures (apothecia) of its host, turning them black, but displays an unusual non-destructive parasitic relationship where infected and healthy tissues coexist in close proximity for years without spreading. First described in 1865 and reclassified in 1973, it remained difficult to place taxonomically until molecular studies in 2011 revealed its relationship to extremophile fungi from Antarctica and parasites of human hair. X. physciae is widespread throughout Europe and notable for its unique ecological behaviour, with spores that disperse readily but rarely germinate under laboratory conditions.

== Taxonomy ==
The genus was circumscribed by David Leslie Hawksworth in 1973 to accommodate a lichenicolous fungus (a fungus that grows on lichens) previously classified as Gymnosporium physciae, originally described by Károly Kalchbrenner in 1865. This taxon was later moved to Coniosporium physciae.

Molecular phylogenetic studies published in 2011 examined the nLSU rDNA region from multiple specimens of Xanthoriicola physciae. The analysis revealed that Xanthoriicola belongs to the family Teratosphaeriaceae within the order Capnodiales. The study employed different analytical methods which yielded slightly different results regarding its closest relatives. Maximum parsimony analysis suggested that species of Piedraia were the closest relatives to Xanthoriicola, while Bayesian analysis indicated that species of Friedmanniomyces might be more closely related. Both analyses, however, consistently placed Xanthoriicola within the same major clade with strong support.

Hawksworth established this new genus after determining that the fungus's characteristics were incompatible with Coniosporium. The type species of Coniosporium (C. olivaceum) produces different spore types (muriform and ellipsoid-to-globose (spherical) conidia) that form in chains, while Xanthoriicola produces single spores from specialized cells called phialides. Additionally, Coniosporiumhas unbranched conidiophores (spore-bearing structures), whereas Xanthoriicola displays irregularly branched, "penicillate" (brush-like) structures.

The genus name Xanthoriicola references its host, combining "Xanthoria" (the lichen genus it grows on) with "-cola" (meaning "dweller").

== Description ==
Xanthoriicola is characterized by the absence of stromata (compact masses of fungal tissue), setae (bristle-like structures), or hyphopodia (specialized attachment structures). The fungus produces semi-macronematous conidiophores (partially differentiated spore-bearing structures) that are densely clustered, erect, branched in an irregular brush-like pattern, short, smooth-walled, and brown in color. Its conidiogenous cells are monophialidic, terminal, determinate, oblong to flask-shaped (ampulliform), brown, and possess a short apical collar-like structure. The conidia are globose (spherical) with minutely echinate (spiny) walls, olivaceous-brown to brown in colour, and produced singly rather than in chains.

The only known species, Xanthoriicola physciae, grows within the fruiting bodies (ascocarps) of its host lichen. Its mycelium (fungal threads) develops in the thecium (spore-producing layer) of the host's ascocarps, causing them to turn black. The hyphae are septate, smooth-walled, pale brown, and 3–6 μm in diameter. The fungus produces its spore-bearing structures 12–20 μm below the surface of the epithecium (upper layer of the ascocarp).

The conidiogenous cells are approximately 5 μm wide and 6 μm tall, with a short collar-like structure (collarette) measuring 0.75–1.25 μm tall. The conidia are spherical, measuring 3.5–6 μm in diameter, and feature minutely spiny walls. When infected by the fungus, the apothecia (fruiting bodies) of the host lichen become sooty black and are easily visible in the field. However, whole colonies of the host lichen are rarely affected, indicating that while the fungus is parasitic, it does not typically destroy host populations.

No sexual stage has been discovered for X. physciae, nor has one been postulated by association with other fungi occurring on the same host lichen. The fungus has not been successfully grown in isolated culture, and experiments attempting to inoculate fresh specimens of the host have proven unsuccessful. These characteristics have historically made it difficult to determine the fungus's taxonomic position before molecular methods became available.

== Habitat, distribution, and ecology ==
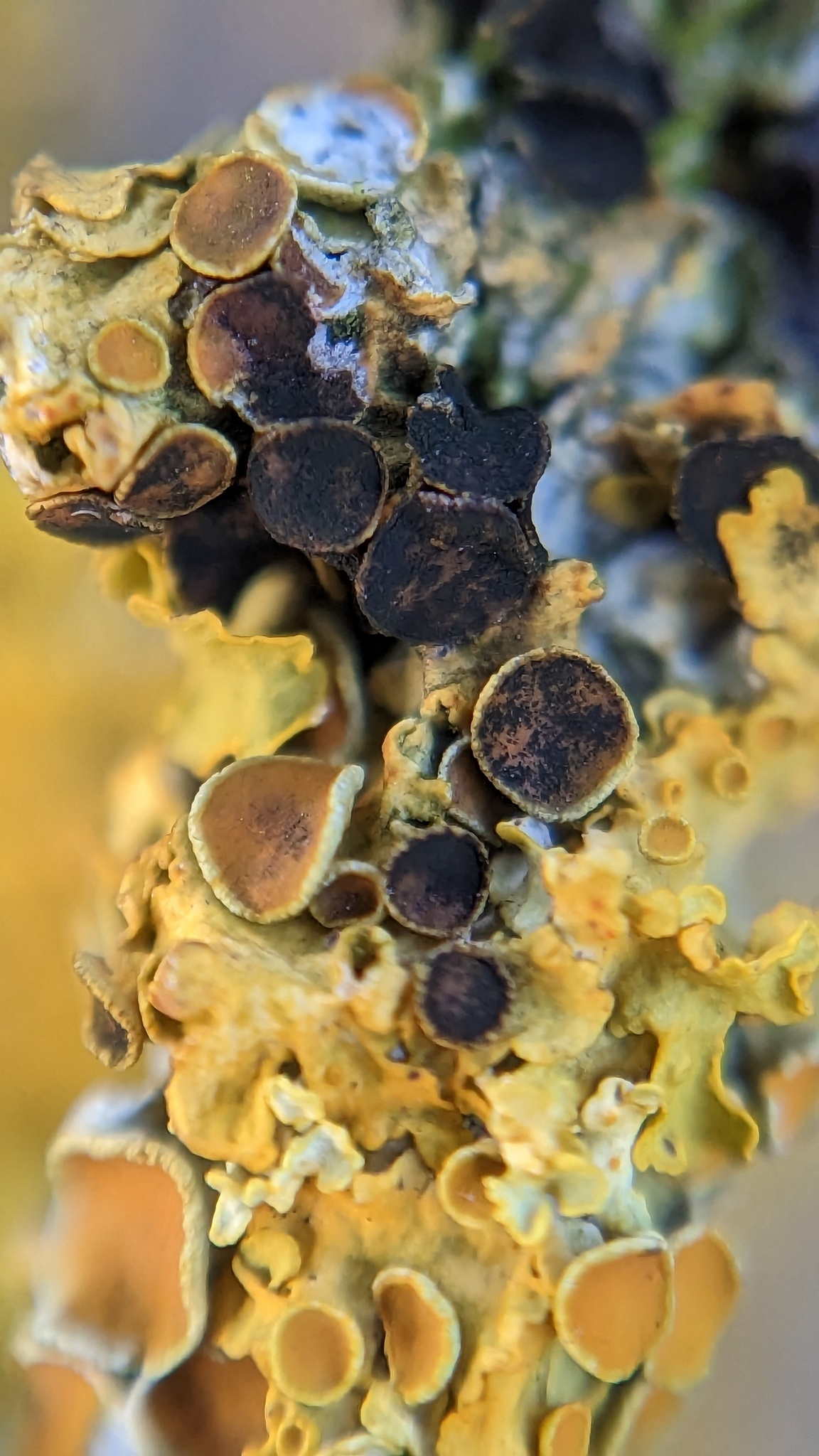
Infested apothecia

Xanthoriicola physciae is a common lichenicolous fungus throughout Europe, including the British Isles. It grows specifically on the ascocarps (fruiting bodies) of the lichen Xanthoria parietina, a common yellow-orange lichen often found on tree bark and rocks.

Xanthoriicola physciae displays several unusual ecological characteristics compared to typical parasitic fungi. The infected, blackened apothecia of its host lichen are typically well-spaced within healthy populations, with affected apothecia often separated by 18–75 cm from each other in a "sea" of unaffected discs. Field observations and experiments have demonstrated a lack of spread to adjacent healthy thalli, even after three years of continuous monitoring of labeled specimens. This non-contagious behavior is particularly unusual among fungal parasites.

The fungus appears to have a remarkably stable and long-lasting relationship with its host. Blackened apothecia can remain apparently unchanged for many years, with some observed on oak branches estimated to be at least 35 years old. Eventually, these infected apothecia become overgrown with green algae. Prior to this succession, other lichens such as Ramalina species may grow amongst them, and occasionally other lichenicolous fungi like the pink Illosporiopsis christiansenii can be found growing on the blackened apothecia themselves. In some cases, the lichen Physcia tenella has been observed growing on infected apothecia, and many instances have been documented where infected areas become overgrown by unidentified buff-coloured resupinate basidiomycetes.

The infected lichen thalli appear to be more susceptible to detachment from their substrate. Observations of tree trunks show that patches of X. parietina missing from collections have fallen out, taking X. physciae with them. These detached fragments can often be found beneath trees following windy conditions, potentially serving as a dispersal mechanism for both the lichen and its fungal parasite.

Despite producing abundant conidia (3.5–6.0 μm in diameter), laboratory attempts to germinate these spores on various media have been unsuccessful, suggesting some form of fungistasis (dormancy). Plastic coverslips suspended in trees with infected lichens have captured numerous ungerminated conidia, indicating that while the spores are readily dispersed, their conditions for germination remain unknown.
