= Achaetobotrys =

Scientific classification
- Domain: Eukaryota
- Kingdom: Fungi
- Division: Ascomycota
- Class: Dothideomycetes
- Order: Capnodiales
- Family: Antennulariellaceae
- Genus: Achaetobotrys; Bat. & Cif.

Type species
- Achaetobotrys affinis (L.R. Fraser) Bat. & Cif.

Genus of fungi

Achaetobotrys is a genus of fungi within the Antennulariellaceae family.

They have been found in Australia and central America.

== Species ==
As accepted by Species Fungorum;

- Achaetobotrys affinis (L.R. Fraser) Bat. & Cif. (1963)
- Achaetobotrys compositarum Bat. & Cif. (1963)
- Achaetobotrys latisporus M.E. Barr & Rogerson (1999)
