= Piedraia =

Scientific classification
- Domain: Eukaryota
- Kingdom: Fungi
- Division: Ascomycota
- Class: Dothideomycetes
- Order: Capnodiales
- Family: Piedraiaceae
- Genus: Piedraia; Fonseca & Leão

Genus of fungi

Piedraia is a genus of fungus within the Piedraiaceae family in the Capnodiales order.

There are 2 known species (according to Species Fungorum);

- Piedraia hortae Fonseca & Leão (1928)
- Piedraia quintanilhae Uden, Barros-Mach. & Cast.-Branco (1963)

Former species;

- P. hortae var. paraguayensis Fonseca & Leão (2014) = Piedraia hortae
- P. javanica Boedijn & Verbunt (1938) = Piedraia hortae
- P. malayi R. Green & Mankikar (1950) = Piedraia hortae
- P. sarmentoi M.J. Pereira (1930) = Piedraia hortae
- P. surinamensis C.W. Dodge (1935) = Piedraia hortae
- P. venezuelensis Brumpt & Langeron (1934) = Piedraia hortae

Piedraia hortae is responsible for causing black piedra.
