= Catinella =

Catinella may refer to:

- Catinella (gastropod), a genus of small air-breathing land snails in the family Succineidae
- Catinella (fungus), a genus of fungi in the class Dothideomycetes
