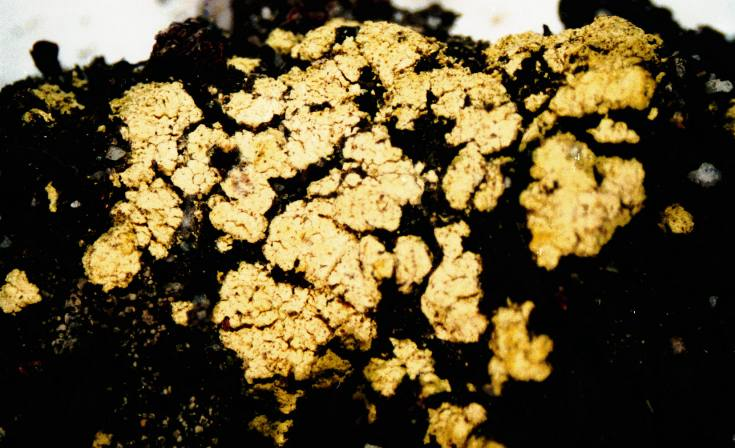
- Arthrorhaphis alpina

Scientific classification
- Domain: Eukaryota
- Kingdom: Fungi
- Division: Ascomycota
- Class: Dothideomycetes
- Subclass: Dothideomycetidae; P.M.Kirk, P.F.Cannon, J.C.David & Stalpers ex C.L.Schoch, Spatafora, Crous & Shoemaker (2007)

Orders
- see text

= Dothideomycetidae =

Subclass of fungi

Dothideomycetidae is a fungal subclass in the class Dothideomycetes The cavities of the sexual structures do not have vertical cells (paraphyses, pseudoparaphyses or paraphysoids) growing between the sac-like cells bearing the sexual spores (asci).

== Description ==
Members of the Dothideomycetidae form small to medium fruiting bodies (ascomata) that develop either within the host tissue or substrate or, in some species, burst through to become visible at the surface; a minority are superficially seated from the outset. Each ascoma may comprise a single cavity (locule) or several interconnected chambers where the spore-bearing sacs (asci) are housed. A minute pore (the ostiole) usually connects the cavity to the outside air, and its short lining filaments (periphysoids) can sometimes be seen under the microscope. The surrounding wall is often built of densely packed, brick-like fungal cells (pseudoparenchyma), but the inner space lacks the long sterile threads (pseudoparaphyses) found in many other ascomycetes.

The asci themselves display a wide range of outlines—from nearly spherical through egg-shaped and club-shaped to elongated cylinders. Inside, the spores vary from colourless to dark brown and may be single-celled, divided by one or several cross walls (septa), or partitioned in both directions to give a muriform (brick-work) appearance. In addition to sexual reproduction, Dothideomycetidae exhibit asexual stages: they may produce conidia inside flask-like chambers embedded in tissue (coelomycetous anamorphs) or openly on thread-like hyphae (hyphomycetous anamorphs).

== Classification ==
According to 2024 Outline of Fungi, the Dothideomycetidae consists of the following orders:

- Arthrocatenales Piątek, Stryjak-Bogacka & Czachura (2024)
- Aureoconidiellales Hern.-Restr. & Crous (2020)
- Capnodiales Woron. (1925)
- Cladosporiales Abdollahz. & Crous (2020)
- Comminutisporales Abdollahz. & Crous (2020)
- Dothideales Lindau (1897)
- Mycosphaerellales (Nannf.) P.F.Cannon (2001)
- Myriangiales Starbäck (1899)
- Neophaeothecales Abdollahz. & Crous (2020)
- Phaeothecales Abdollahz. & Crous (2020)
- Racodiales Abdollahz. & Crous (2020)

== Genera incertae cedis ==
- Aenigmatomyces R.F.Castañeda & W.B.Kendr. (1994)
