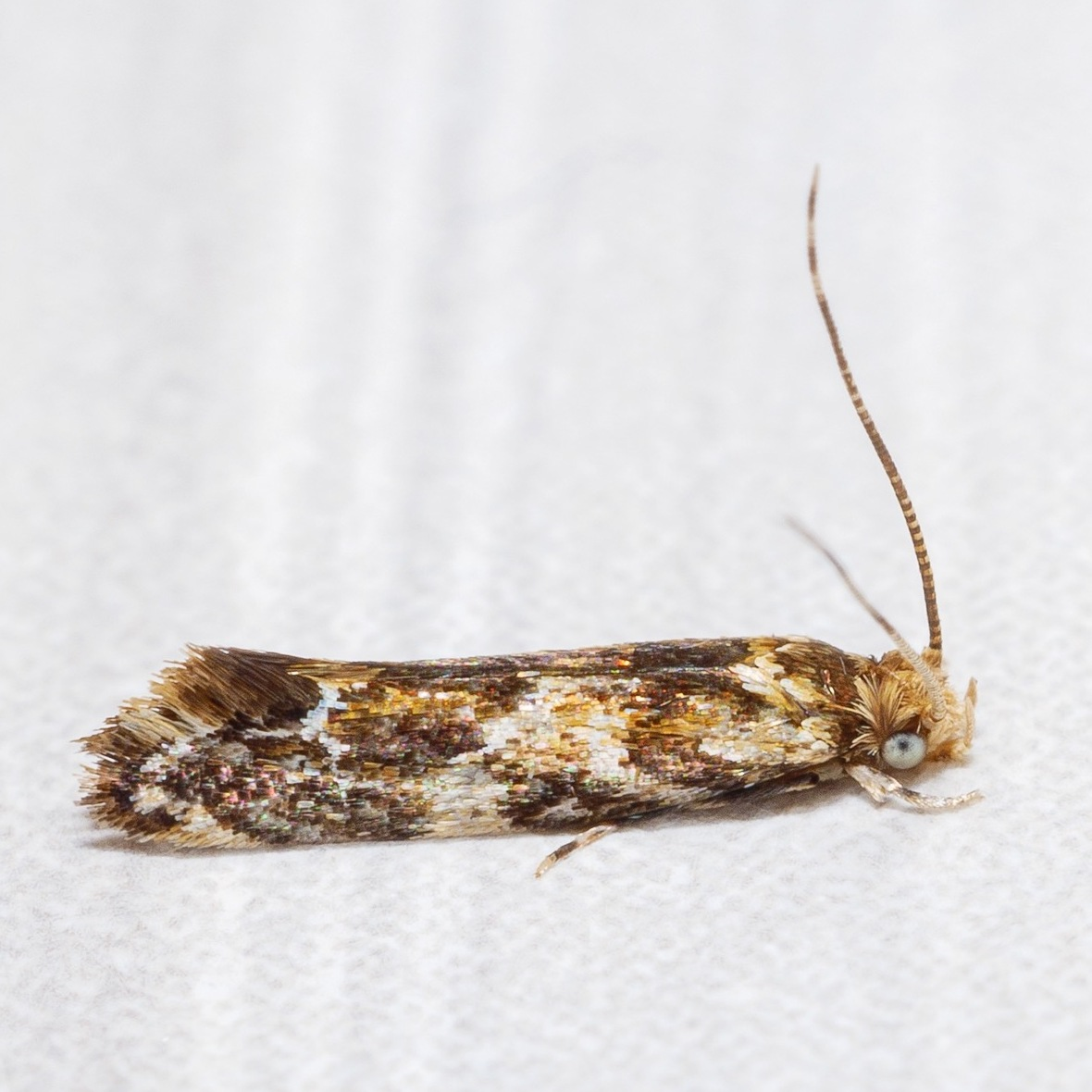

Scientific classification
- Kingdom: Animalia
- Phylum: Arthropoda
- Class: Insecta
- Order: Lepidoptera
- Family: Tineidae
- Genus: Dryadaula
- Species: D. pactolia

Binomial name
- Dryadaula pactolia Meyrick, 1901

= Dryadaula pactolia =

Species of moth

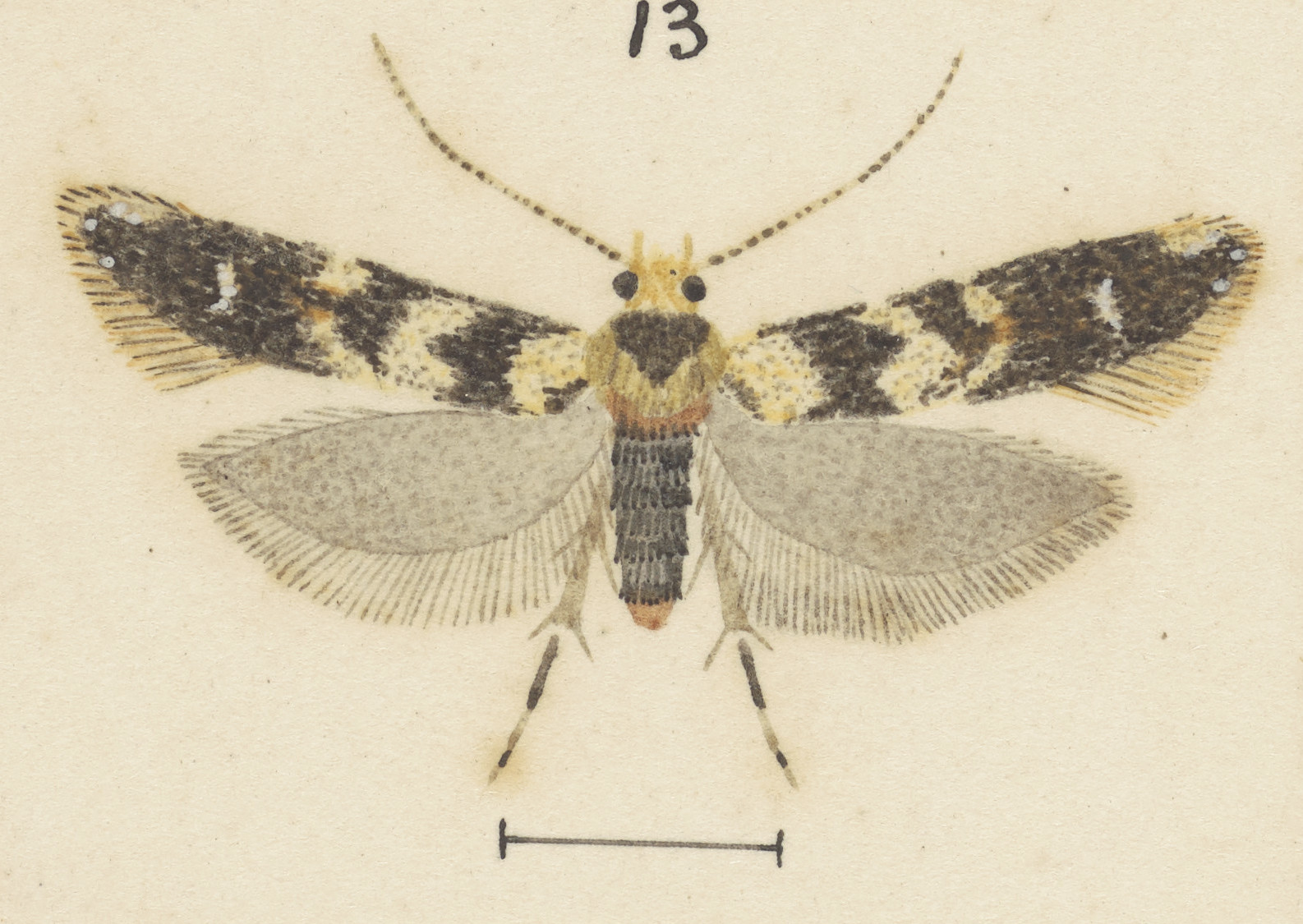
Illustration by George Hudson c. 1927

Dryadaula pactolia is a species of moth in the family Tineidae. It was described by Edward Meyrick in 1901. This species is endemic to New Zealand. but it is occasional in Europe (British Isles including Ireland, Germany Switzerland) The larva feeds on the fungus Zasmidium cellare found in wine cellars and breweries.
