= Metacapnodiaceae =

Scientific classification
- Kingdom: Fungi
- Division: Ascomycota
- Class: Dothideomycetes
- Order: Capnodiales
- Family: Metacapnodiaceae; Hughes & Corlett
- Genus: Metacapnodium; Speg.

Family of fungi

The Metacapnodiaceae was a monotypic family of fungi in the Ascomycota, class Dothideomycetes. The family contained the single genus Metacapnodium. Wijayawardene et al. 2022 added 2 other genera to the family.

== Genera ==
- Capnobotrys S. Hughes (10)
- Hyphosoma Syd. (6)
- Metacapnodium Speg. (15)
- Metacapnodium adamantinum S. Hughes & T.J. Atk. (2012)
- Metacapnodium crassum (Pat.) S. Hughes (1981)
- Metacapnodium dennisii S. Hughes (1977)
- Metacapnodium dingleyae S. Hughes (1981)
- Metacapnodium ericophilum (Link) D. Hawksw. & S. Hughes (2013)
- Metacapnodium fraserae (S. Hughes) S. Hughes (1976)
- Metacapnodium gemmiferum S. Hughes & T.J. Atk. (2012)
- Metacapnodium guava (Cooke) S. Hughes (1981)
- Metacapnodium juniperi (W. Phillips & Plowr.) Speg. (1918)
- Metacapnodium moniliforme (L.R. Fraser) S. Hughes (1976)
- Metacapnodium neesii (S. Hughes) Sugiy. & Hosoya (2020)
- Metacapnodium quinqueseptatum (M.E. Barr) S. Hughes (1972)
- Metacapnodium smilacinum (J.M. Mend.) S. Hughes (1981)
- Metacapnodium spongiosum S. Hughes & Sivan. (1984)
- Metacapnodium succinum (Dörfelt, A.R. Schmidt & J. Wunderl.) Rikkinen, Dörfelt, A.R. Schmidt & J. Wunderl. (2003)
