= Job Bicknell Ellis =

American mycologist (1829–1905)

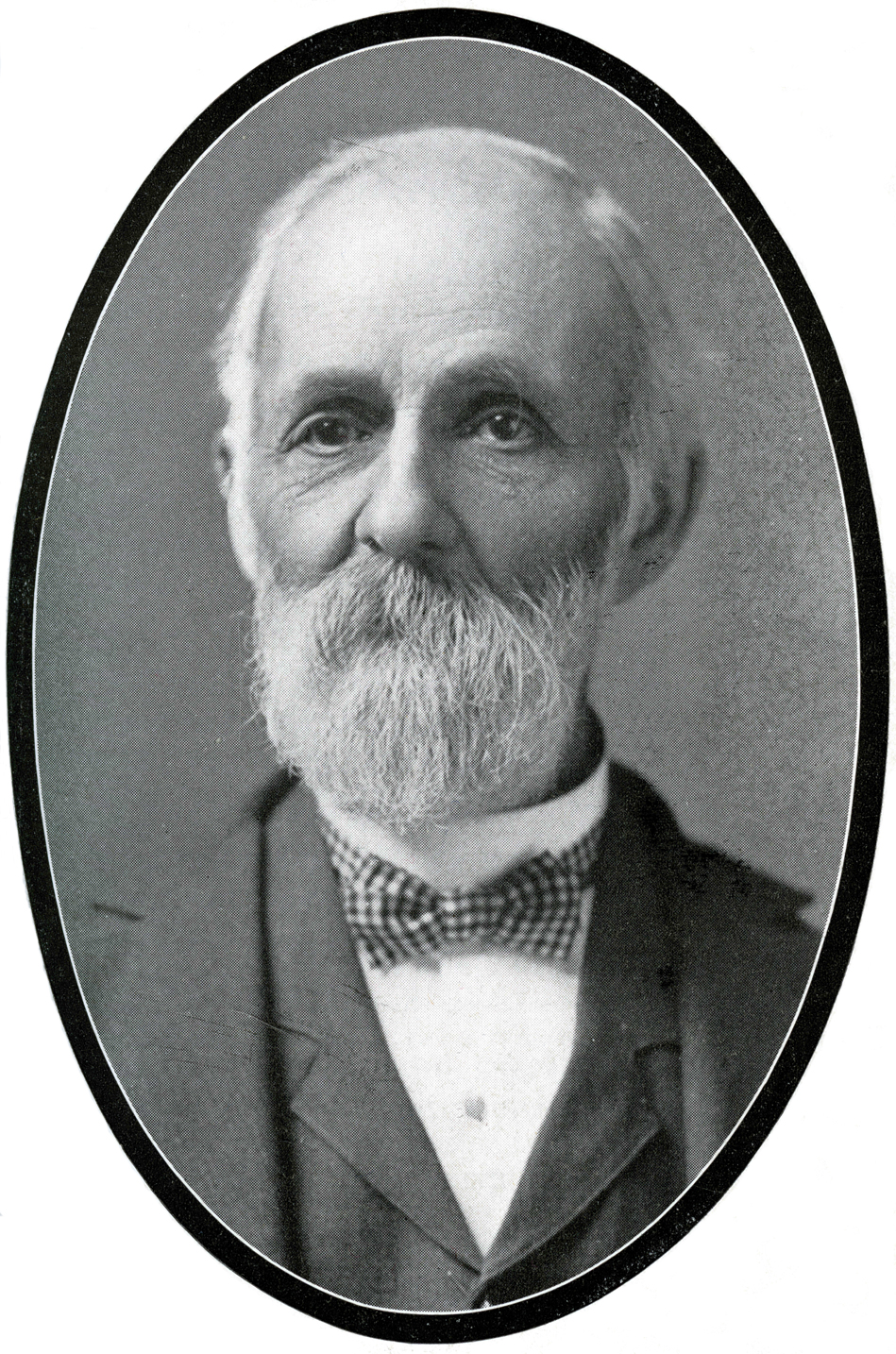
- Born: January 21, 1829; Potsdam, New York
- Died: December 30, 1905 (aged 76); Newfield, New Jersey
- Known for: Collecting and classifying ascomycetes, particularly Sordariomycetes
- Scientific career
- Fields: Mycology
- Author abbrev. (botany): Ellis

Job Bicknell Ellis (January 21, 1829 – December 30, 1905) was a pioneering North American mycologist known for his study of ascomycetes, especially the grouping of fungi called the Pyrenomycetes (known today as the Sordariomycetes). Born and raised in New York, he worked as a teacher and farmer before developing an interest in mycology. He collected specimens extensively, and together with his wife, prepared 200,000 sets of dried fungal samples that were sent out to subscribers in series between 1878 and 1894. Together with colleagues William A. Kellerman and Benjamin Matlack Everhart, he founded the Journal of Mycology in 1885, forerunner to the modern journal Mycologia. He described over 4000 species of fungi, and his collection of over 100,000 specimens is currently housed at the herbarium of the New York Botanical Gardens. Ellis had over 100 taxa of fungi named in his honor.

== Life ==
Ellis was born in Potsdam, New York, on January 21, 1829, to parents Freeman Ellis and Sarah Bicknell. He was the tenth child of fourteen. In 1851, he graduated from Union College in Schenectady, New York, the same institution attended by lichenologist Edward Tuckerman (A.B. 1837) and mycologist Charles Horton Peck (A.B. 1859). Bicknell began an erratic career as a classics teacher and farmer in New York, Pennsylvania, and South Carolina. He became the principal of the Canton Academy in 1856, the same year he married Arvilla Jane Bacon, who became his lifelong assistant and collaborator. Their daughter Cora was born on January 12, 1857; she later became a professional musician in New York. It was around this time that Bicknell started developing his interest in botany, by collecting plants with fellow teachers on weekends. He saw a copy of Henry William Ravenel's Fungi Caroliniani Exsiccati, a set of dried specimens (exsiccata) collected and distributed from North Carolina and area. Ellis initiated a correspondence with Ravenel, and established a friendship that lasted until Ravenel's death in 1887.

Ellis taught in a public school in Potsdam village in 1863, and later served on the Union side in the American Civil War from 1864 to 1865. He served on the steam frigate USS Susquehanna of the North Atlantic Blockading Squadron, and was present during the bombardment of Fort Fisher on December 24–25, 1864 and January 13–15, 1865, when the Fort was captured. The war took its toll on his spirits; his April 22, 1865, diary entry reads: "I have felt degraded ever since I have been here & no amount of money & I might perhaps safely say no motive not even patriotism will ever induce me to put myself in the like position again." He was discharged from the Navy on May 18, 1865, and returned to Potsdam. After the war Ellis settled in Newfield, New Jersey, where he lived until his death.

Although he did not have any formal training as a botanist or mycologist, Ellis gradually took up mycological fieldwork and ultimately dedicated his life to the collection and exchange of dried fungal specimens. He created four exsiccata series as reference collections that were sold in sets of one hundred, or "centuries". The most important of these were the Fungi Nova-Caesarienses (Fungi of New Jersey) (1878) and the North American Fungi, issued in two series from 1878 to 1898 (series II from 1886 co-edited by Benjamin Matlack Everhart). The complete set of North American Fungi numbered 3600 specimens. The obituary of his wife, who died on July 18, 1899, elaborated her devotion to his work:

Besides binding many of her husband's books and pamphlets, she prepared some three thousand blank books in which the North American Fungi were issued and in which the greater part of the Ellis collection was mounted. Besides this she arranged at least three fourths of the 200,000 specimens which were issued in this exsiccata series and in the Fungi Columbiani. folding papers, inserting specimens, pasting labels and inserting in their places.

He was exceedingly timid and shrinking, but possessed of a charming personality,
and by his lovable disposition endeared himself to all who knew him.

— Curtis Gates Lloyd

Based in Newfield, New Jersey, Ellis maintained an extensive correspondence with many renowned American and European mycologists. In 1880, Ellis began to receive financial support from Benjamin Matlock Everhart, a wealthy merchant of West Chester, Pennsylvania. Together they co-authored North American Pyrenomycetes (1892). With William A. Kellerman, Ellis and Everhart founded the Journal of Mycology in 1885, a forerunner to Mycologia. Most of the articles in the first issues were written by Ellis. He published many of his newly discovered species in the journal, as well as the Botanical Gazette, Torrey Bulletin, American Naturalist, and Proceedings of the Philadelphia Academy. In 1896, near the end of his life, Ellis sold his collection of over 100,000 specimens to the New York Botanical Garden for its Cryptogamic Herbarium, including the types of 4,000 new species described by Ellis and his collaborators. The Garden Library also received a "large cache" of his letters in 1983. Ellis was one of the most prolific authors of new fungal species, having formally described about 3520 in his career. He was also a prolific author, and published over 500 scientific articles. He died December 30, 1905, in Newfield.

== Memberships and societies ==
Ellis was honored by several scientific societies. In 1878, he was elected a corresponding member of Philadelphia's Academy of Natural Sciences. In August 1882 he was elected a corresponding member of the Cryptogamic Society of Scotland and in December of the same year was elected a corresponding member of "Die Kaiserlich-Königliche Zoologisch-Botanische Gesellschaft in Wien".

== Eponymous taxa ==
Genera
- Ellisiella Bat. 1956
- Ellisiella Sacc. 1881 (now Colletotrichum)
- Ellisiellina Sousa da Câmara 1949 (now Colletotrichum)
- Elisiodothis Theiss 1914
- Ellisiopsis Bat. 1956 (now Beltraniella)
- Ellisomyces Benny & R.K. Benj. 1975
- Ellisius Gray. 1821
- Jobellisia M.E. Barr 1993
Species
- Acanthostigma ellisii Sacc. & P. Syd. 1899
- Aecidium ellisii Tracy & L.D. Galloway 1888
- Albatrellopsis ellisii (Berk.) Teixeira 1994
- Albatrellus ellisii (Berk.) Pouzar 1966
- Alternaria ellisii Pandotra & Ganguly 1964
- Annellophorella ellisii Reisinger & Kiffer 1970
- Anthostoma ellisii Sacc.
- Ascochyta ellisii Thüm.
- Asterina ellisii Sacc. & P. Syd. 1899
- Atractobolus ellisiella (Rehm) Kuntze 1898
- Bactridium ellisii Berk. 1874
- Bipolaris ellisii (Danquah) Alcorn 1983
- Botrytis ellisii Sacc. & P. Syd. 1899
- Bullaria ellisii (De Toni) Arthur & Mains
- Calathella ellisii Agerer 1983
- Caliciopsis ellisii Sacc.
- Calycina ellisii (Dennis) Raitv. 2004
- Capnodium ellisii Sacc.
- Cenangium ellisii Sacc.
- Cercospora ellisii Sacc. & P. Syd. 1899
- Ceuthospora ellisii Sacc. & Trotter 1913
- Chaetendophragmia ellisii (Piroz.) B. Sutton & Hodges 1978
- Chaetomium ellisianum Sacc. & P. Syd.
- Chaetoplea ellisii (Sacc. & P. Syd.) M.E. Barr 1990
- Chaetosphaeria ellisii (M.E. Barr) Huhndorf & F.A. Fernández 2005
- Chalara ellisii Nag Raj & W.B. Kendr. 1975
- Clasterosporium ellisii Sacc. & P. Syd. 1899
- Clathrosphaerina ellisii Purohit, Panwar & N.L.Vyas 1974
- Cochliobolus ellisii Alcorn 1983
- Collybia ellisii (Murrill) Murrill 1917
- Comatricha ellisii Morgan 1894
- Coniochaeta ellisiorum P.F. Cannon
- Coniophora ellisii (Berk. & M.A. Curtis) Sacc. 1888
- Coprinellus ellisii (P.D. Orton) Redhead, Vilgalys & Moncalvo 2001
- Coprinus ellisii P.D. Orton 1960
- Corticium ellisii (Berk. & M.A. Curtis) Cooke 1880
- Coryne ellisii Berk. 1873
- Cucurbitaria ellisii Sacc. & P. Syd.
- Curvularia ellisii S.I. Ahmed & M. Qureshi 1960
- Cylindrosporium ellisii Halst.
- Cylindrotrichum ellisii Morgan-Jones 1977
- Dacrymyces ellisii Coker 1920
- Dacryopsis ellisiana Massee 1891
- Dasyscyphus ellisianus (Rehm) Sacc. 1889
- Dendryphion ellisii Cooke 1878
- Diaporthe ellisii Rehm
- Dicaeoma ellisianum (Thüm.) Kuntze 1898
- Dicaeoma ellisii (De Toni) Kuntze 1898
- Didymostilbe ellisii A.S. Saxena & Mukerji 1970
- Dimerosporium ellisii Sacc.
- Diplodina ellisii Sacc.
- Dothiora ellisii (M.E. Barr) Shoemaker & C.E. Babc. 1987
- Dothiorella ellisii Arx 1957
- Drechslera ellisii Danquah 1975
- Endophragmiella ellisii S. Hughes 1979
- Engizostoma ellisii Kuntze 1898
- Entoleuca ellisii Y.M. Ju, J.D. Rogers & H.M. Hsieh 2005
- Entyloma ellisii Halst. 1890
- Entylomella ellisii (Halst.) Cif. 1959
- Erynia ellisiana Ben Ze'ev 1986
- Erysiphe ellisii (U. Braun) U. Braun & S. Takam. 2000
- Fomes ellisianus F.W. Anderson 1891
- Furia ellisiana (Ben Ze'ev) Humber 1989
- Fusicoccum ellisianum Sacc. & P. Syd. 1899
- Fusicoccum ellisii Petr. & Died. 1913
- Glabrocyphella ellisiana W.B. Cooke 1961
- Gloniopsis ellisii Cash 1939
- Gymnopus ellisii Murrill 1917
- Gymnosporangium ellisii Berk. 1879
- Hamaspora ellisii (Berk.) Körn. 1877
- Haplaria ellisii Cooke 1889
- Helicosporium ellisii Cooke
- Hemiarcyria ellisii Massee 1889
- Herpotrichia ellisii (Sacc. & P. Syd.) M.E. Barr 1992
- Hydnum ellisianum Thüm. 1878
- Hydnum ellisianum (Banker) Sacc. & Trotter 1912
- Hymenochaete ellisii Berk. & M.A. Curtis 1876
- Hymenoscyphus ellisii Dennis 1964
- Hyphopolynema ellisiorum B. Sutton & Alcorn 1984
- Kylindria ellisii (Morgan-Jones) DiCosmo, S.M. Berch & W.B. Kendr. 1983
- Lachnella ellisiana (Rehm) Seaver 1951
- Lasiosphaeria ellisii M.E. Barr 1993
- Leptosphaeria ellisiana Berl.
- Lyophyllum ellisii (P.D. Orton) Cons. & Contu 2001
- Macroplodia ellisii (Sacc.) Kuntze 1898
- Melanopsamma ellisii Sacc. & P. Syd. 1899
- Meliola ellisii Roum. 1880
- Microscypha ellisii Dennis 1971
- Microsphaera ellisii U. Braun 1982
- Monochaetia ellisiana Sacc. & D. Sacc. 1906
- Myxosporium ellisii Sacc. 1884
- Nectria ellisii C. Booth 1959
- Niptera ellisii Rehm
- Nodulisporium ellisii (Sacc. & P. Syd.) S. Hughes 1958
- Odontia ellisiana (Thüm.) Rick 1933
- Ophiobolus ellisianus Berl.
- Peniophora ellisii Massee 1889
- Perenniporia ellisiana (F.W. Anderson) Gilb. & Ryvarden 1985
- Periconia ellisii P.Rag. Rao & D. Rao 1964
- Periconiella ellisii Merny & B. Huguenin 1962
- Pestalotia ellisii Sacc. & P. Syd. 1899
- Peziza ellisiana Rehm
- Phellodon ellisianus Banker 1906
- Phillipsiella ellisii M.E. Barr 1993
- Phragmidium ellisii (Berk.) Sacc. 1888
- Phyllosticta ellisiana Lambotte & Fautrey 1894
- Phyllosticta ellisii Sacc. & P. Syd. 1899
- Pithomyces ellisii V.G. Rao & Chary 1972
- Pleospora ellisii Wehm. 1961
- Pleurage ellisiana Griffiths 1901
- Plochmopeltis ellisii Arx 1959
- Podisoma ellisii (Berk.) Mussat 1874
- Podospora ellisiana (Griffiths) Mirza & Cain 1970
- Polynema ellisii B. Sutton
- Polypilus ellisii (Berk.) Teixeira 1992
- Polyporus ellisianus (Murrill) Sacc. & Trotter 1912
- Polyporus ellisii Berk. 1878
- Polystictus ellisianus Lloyd 1920
- Poria ellisiana (F.W. Anderson) Ginns 1984
- Pseudocercospora pamelae-ellisiae (G.P. Agarwal & N.D. Sharma) U. Braun 1999
- Psilachnum ellisii (Dennis) E. Weber & Baral 1992
- Puccinia ellisiana Thüm. 1878
- Puccinia ellisii De Toni 1888
- Pyrenopeziza ellisii Massee 1896
- Rhabdospora ellisii Sacc. & P. Syd. 1899
- Rhinocladiella ellisii D. Hawksw. 1977 (now Zasmidium cellare)
- Roestelia ellisii Peck 1875
- Scindalma ellisianum (F.W. Anderson) Kuntze 1898
- Sciniatosporium ellisii (M.B. Ellis) Morgan-Jones 1971
- Scutiger ellisii (Berk.) Murrill 1903
- Septoria ellisiana Sacc. & P. Syd. 1902
- Septoria ellisii Berl. & Voglino 1886
- Sordaria ellisiana (Griffiths) Sacc. & D. Sacc. 1905
- Sorosporium ellisii G. Winter
- Sphaeropsis ellisii Sacc. 1884
- Sporidesmium ellisii Piroz. 1972
- Sporisorium ellisii (G. Winter) M. Piepenbr. 2003
- Stigmina ellisiana B. Sutton 1972
- Stigmina ellisii M.B. Ellis 1959
- Stigmina pamelae-ellisiae G.P. Agarwal & N.D. Sharma 1974
- Tephrocybe ellisii P.D. Orton 1988
- Tetrabrunneospora ellisii Dyko 1978
- Tetraploa ellisii Cooke 1879
- Tomentella ellisii (Sacc.) Jülich & Stalpers 1980
- Torula ellisii Yadav & Lal 1966
- Trametes ellisiana Henn. 1895
- Tyromyces ellisianus Murrill 1907
- Uromyces ellisianus Henn. 1898
- Volutella ellisii Langl. 1887
- Wettsteinina ellisii M.E. Barr 1972
- Zoophthora ellisiana (Ben Ze'ev) Balazy 1993
- Zygodesmus ellisii Sacc. 1886

== See also ==
- Category:Taxa named by Job Bicknell Ellis
