= Euantennariaceae =

Scientific classification
- Kingdom: Fungi
- Division: Ascomycota
- Class: Dothideomycetes
- Order: Capnodiales
- Family: Euantennariaceae; S.Hughes & Corlett, 1972

Type genus
- Euantennaria Speg., 1918

Family of fungi

The Euantennariaceae are a family of fungi in the order Capnodiales.

== Genera ==
With approx.amount of species in brackets;

- Capnokyma S.Hughes (2)
- Euantennaria Speg. (9)
- Hormisciomyces Bat. & Nascim. (3)
- Plokamidomyces Bat., C.A.A.Costa & Cif. (1)
- Rasutoria M.E.Barr (2)
- Strigopodia Bat. (2)
- Trichothallus F.Stevens (2)
