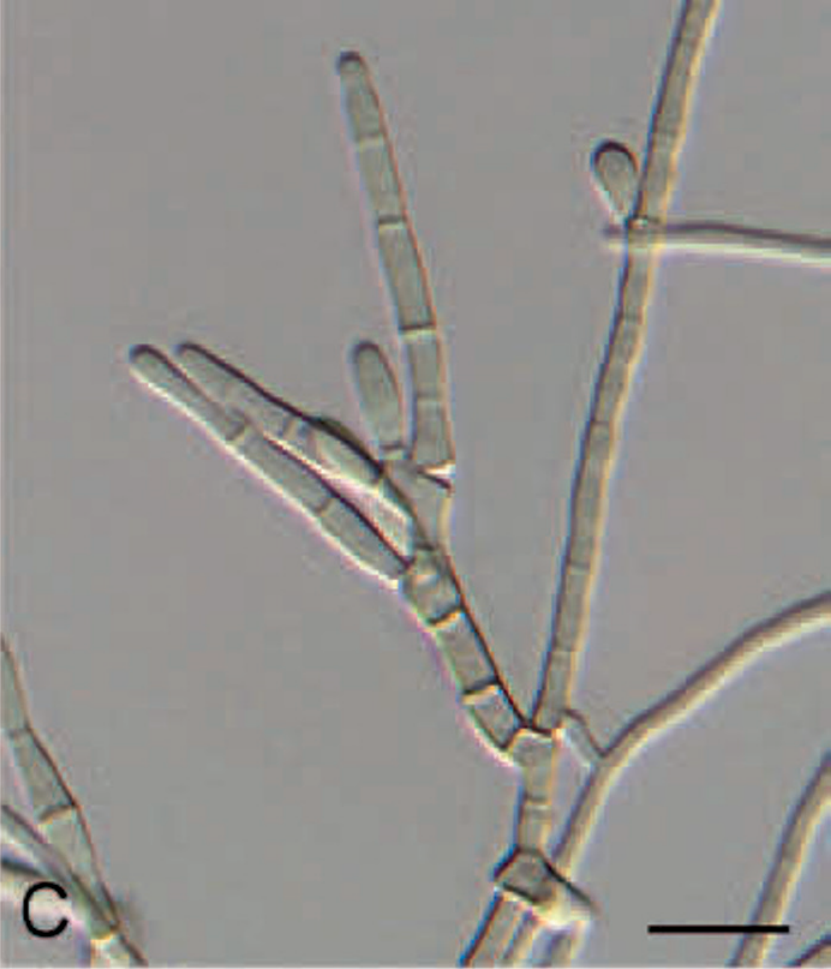
- Conidiophores generating conidia.

Scientific classification
- Kingdom: Fungi
- Division: Ascomycota
- Class: Dothideomycetes
- Order: Capnodiales
- Family: Xenodevriesiaceae; Crous
- Genus: Xenodevriesia; Crous
- Species: X. strelitziicola

Binomial name
- Xenodevriesia strelitziicola (Arzanlou & Crous) Crous 2019

Synonyms
- Devriesia strelitziicola Arzanlou & Crous 2009

= Xenodevriesia =

Species of ascomycete fungus

Xenodevriesia strelitziicola is a pathogenic ascomycete fungus in the class Dothideomycetes that infects the South African plant Strelitzia. It is the only species of the monotypic genus Xenodevriesia and family Xenodevriesiaceae.

== Morphology and reproduction ==
Xenodevriesia mycelium consists of medium brown, smooth, septate, branched hyphae. The conidiophores are dimorphic: there are microconidiophores and macroconidiophores.

The microconidiophores are reduced to conidiogenous cells (i.e. capable of generating conidia) on hyphae that are erect, cylindrical, medium brown in color, smooth, with truncated ends and proliferating sympodially. The conidiogenous cells appear at terminal or lateral locations on top of branched conidiophores; they are also medium brown in color, smooth and cylindrical, and also grow sympodially.

The macroconidiophores are erect, cylindrical, between straight and sinuous in shape, medium brown in color, smooth, and unbranched or branched only above.

The conidia themselves are smooth, guttulate (i.e. spores containing one or more oil-like globules), between subcylindrical and narrowly obclavate in shape, with an apex obtuse or truncate and a truncate base; they occur in branched chains that are widest at the basal septum. The hila are inconspicuous or somewhat darkened and thickened, and aren't refractive.

There has been no observation of chlamydospores.

In particular, X. strelitziicola presents hyphae measuring 2–3 μm in width; microconidiophores measuring 4–7 x 2–3 μm; conidiogenous cells measuring 7–15 x 2.5–3 μm; macroconidiophores measuring 30–100 x 2.5–3 μm; and conidia with hila that are 1-1.5 μm wide.

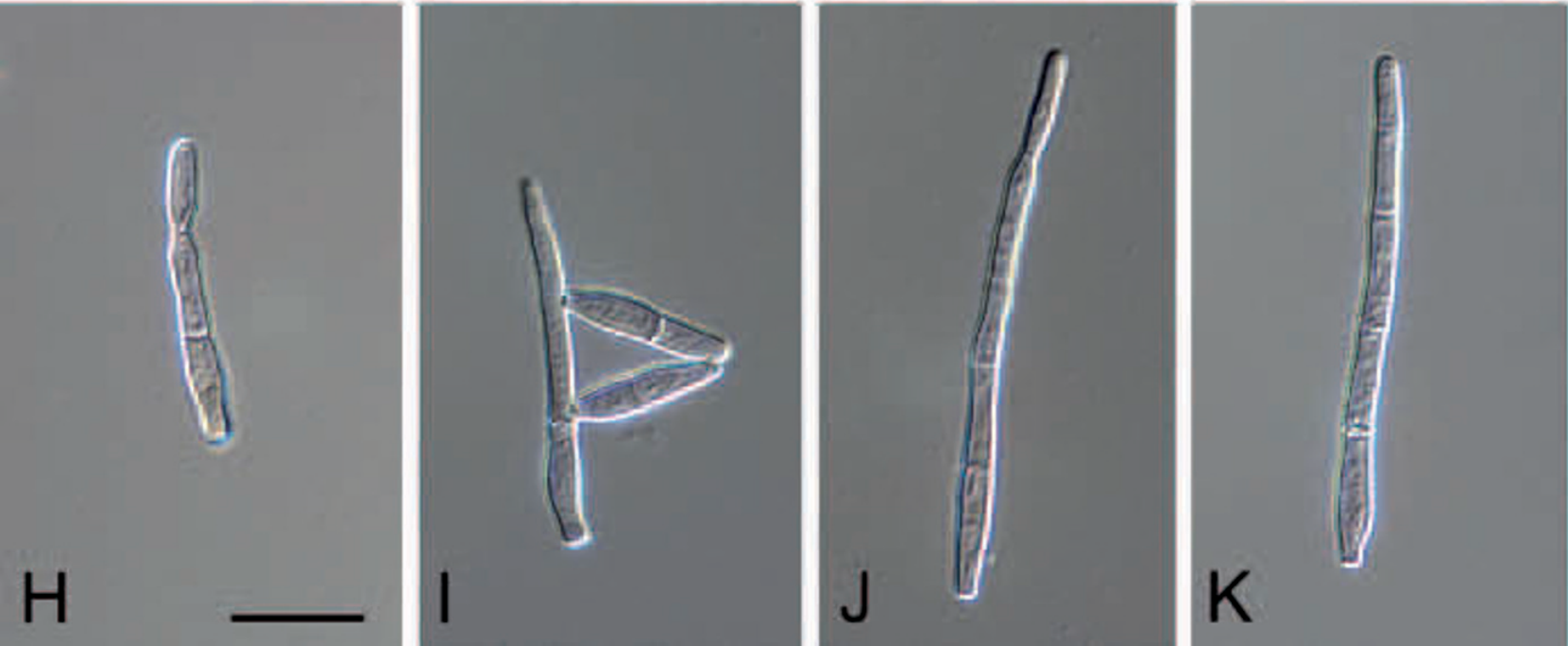
Light microscopy images of several Xenodevriesia stretziicola conidia.

== Taxonomy and etymology ==
First described in 2009, the species was placed in the genus Devriesia, located in the family Teratosphaeriaceae, under the name Devriesia strelitziicola, in which the epithet is a reference to the host Strelitzia.

In 2019 it was moved to its own genus Xenodevriesia and its own family Xenodevriesiaceae, after a phylogenetic analysis of the entire Dothideomycetes class showed its independence from the genus Devriesia.
