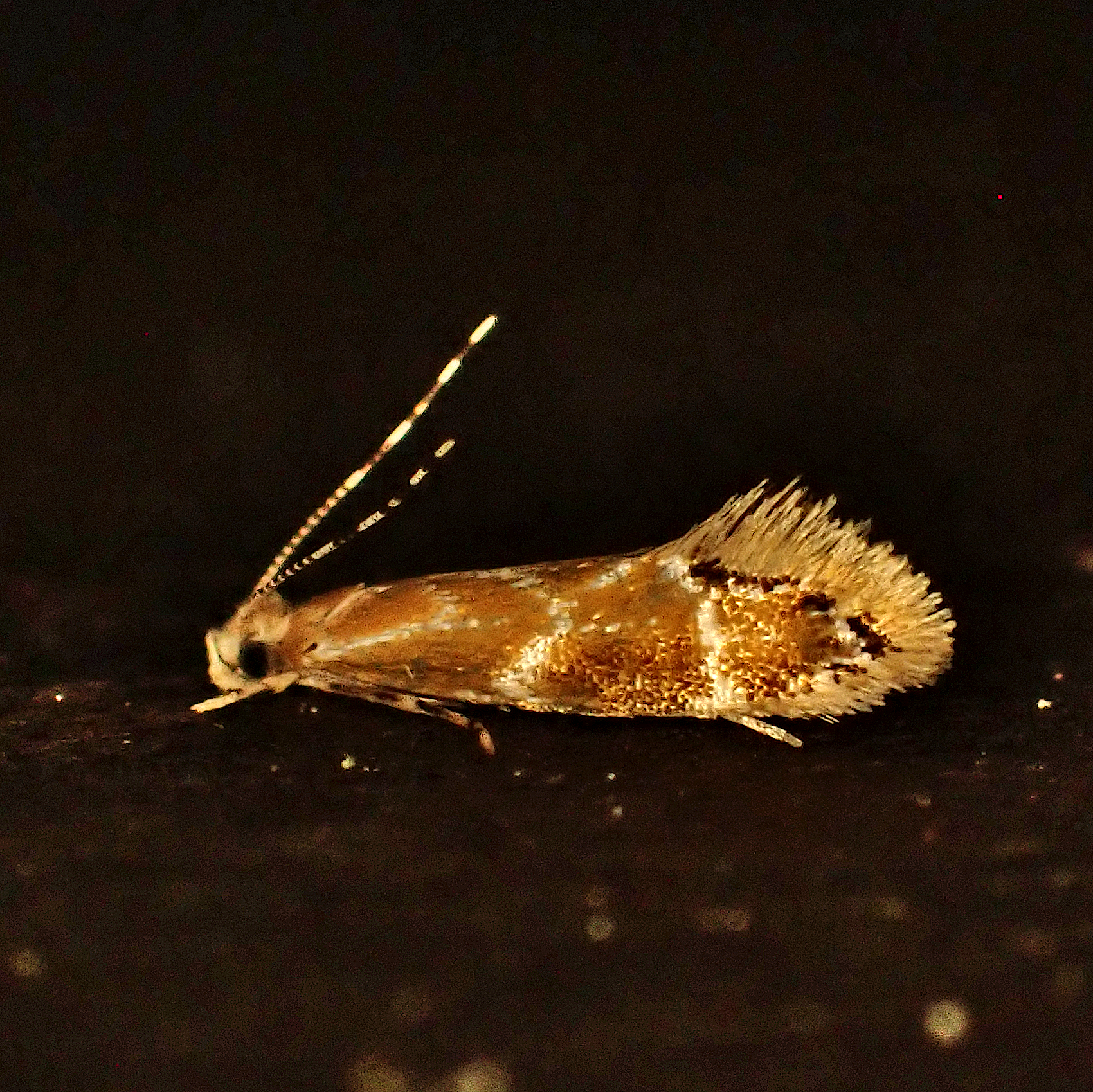

Scientific classification
- Kingdom: Animalia
- Phylum: Arthropoda
- Clade: Pancrustacea
- Class: Insecta
- Order: Lepidoptera
- Family: Tineidae
- Genus: Dryadaula
- Species: D. castanea

Binomial name
- Dryadaula castanea Philpott, 1915

= Dryadaula castanea =

Species of moth endemic to New Zealand

Dryadaula castanea is a species of moth in the family Tineidae. It was first described by Alfred Philpott in 1915. This species is endemic to New Zealand and can be found in the North and South Islands. D. castanea frequents native bush and forest. Adults are on the wing from November until January. Adults can be distinguished from similar species as a result of its distinct white lines. It is much darker than its sister species Dryadaula myrrhina .

== Taxonomy ==
Male holotype

This species was first described by Alfred Philpott in 1915 using specimens collected in Bluff and Invercargill in November and December. George Hudson discussed and illustrated this species in his 1928 book The butterflies and moths of New Zealand. The male holotype specimen, collected in Bluff, is held at the New Zealand Arthropod Collection.

== Description ==
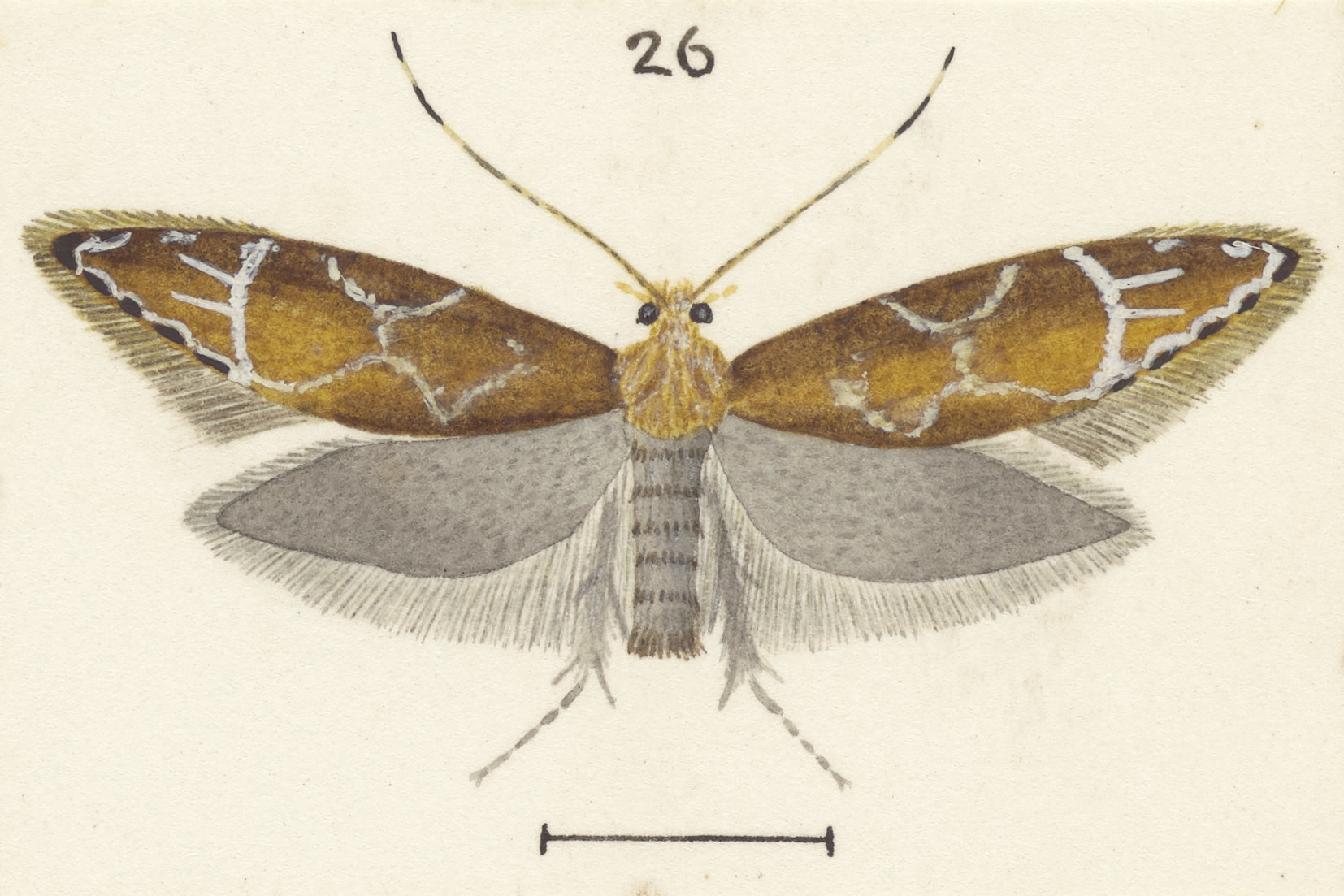
Illustration by Hudson.

D. castanea at rest.

Philpott described this species as follows:

♂. 9-10 mm. Head and palpi white mixed with pale brownish-vellow. Antennae white annulated with ochreous and with three broad darker bands on apical half. Thorax bright ochreous. Abdomen ochreous-fuscous, anal tuft ochreous. Forewings, costa gently arched, apex subacute, termen very oblique; bright brownish-yellow; a thin white line from base along fold to 1/3 ; a narrow white straight fascia front costa at 1/3 to dorsum at 3/4 ; a similar fascia from costa at 3/4 to tornus, slightly outwards-curved, rather suffused beneath costa and sending out one or two white streaks towards termen ; a white fascia from dorsum near base to extremity of basal line ; a second dorsal fascia from 1/2, touching first costal fascia beneath middle; a chain of black spots round apex and along termen, anteriorly margined with white : cilia reddish-brown. Hindwings and cilia fuscous-grey.

D. castanea is much darker than its sister species Dryadaula myrrhina and the distinct white lines on its forewings are another distinguishing characteristic.

== Distribution ==
This species is endemic to New Zealand. D. castanea occurs in the North and South Islands. Hudson regarded this species as rare.

== Habitat ==
This species frequents native bush and forest.

== Behaviour ==
Adults are on the wing from November until January.
