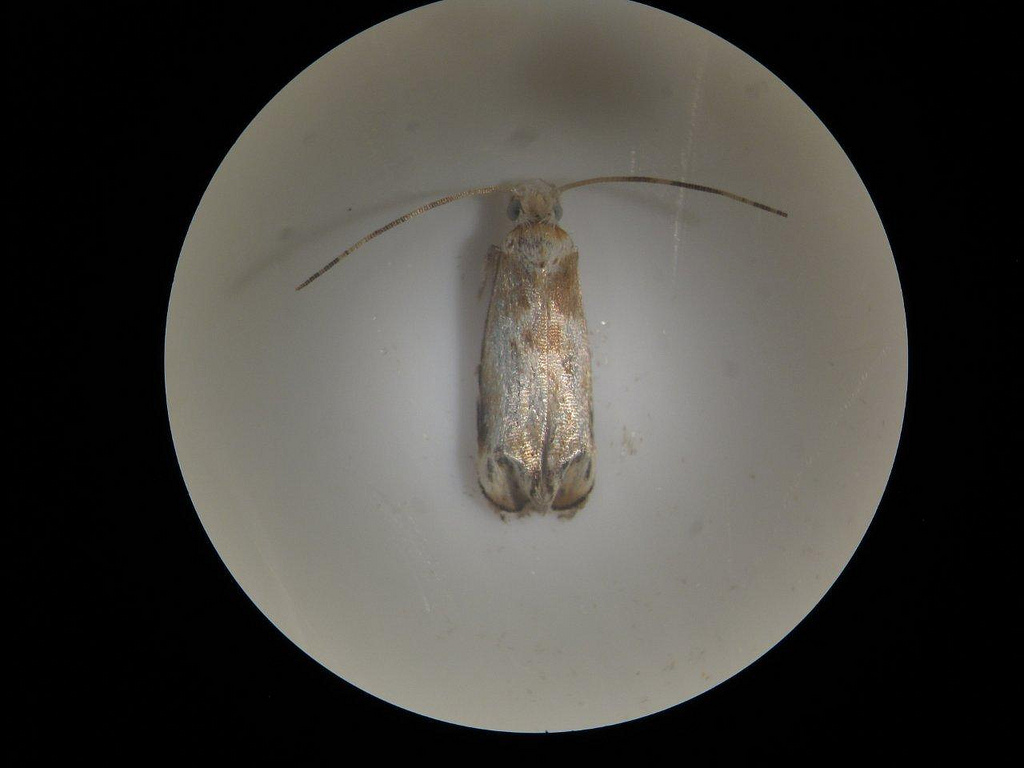

Scientific classification
- Kingdom: Animalia
- Phylum: Arthropoda
- Class: Insecta
- Order: Lepidoptera
- Family: Tineidae
- Genus: Dryadaula
- Species: D. terpsichorella

Binomial name
- Dryadaula terpsichorella (Busck, 1910)

Synonyms
- Cyane terpsichorella Busck, 1910; Choropleca terpsichorella; Diachalastis tetraglossa Meyrick, 1920

= Dryadaula terpsichorella =

Dancing moth

Species of moth

Dryadaula terpsichorella, the dancing moth, is a moth of the family Tineidae. It is native to south-eastern Polynesia, Samoa and Fiji, but has also been recorded from Hawaii and more recently from Florida and California. The common name is derived from the characteristic dancelike gyrations it goes through when it alights. It was first described by August Busck in 1910.

Larvae have been found among dead leaves and on other parts of banana, Costus spicatus, ferns, Pandanus, pineapple, sugarcane and other plants.
