= Antennulariellaceae =

Scientific classification
- Kingdom: Fungi
- Division: Ascomycota
- Class: Dothideomycetes
- Order: Capnodiales
- Family: Antennulariellaceae; Woron.

Type genus
- Antennulariella Woron. (1915)

Family of fungi

The Antennulariellaceae are a family of fungi in the Ascomycota, class Dothideomycetes. The family was named by Nikolai Nikolaevich Woronichin in 1925 to contain the genus Antennulariella that he had described a decade earlier in 1915. Species in the family have a widespread distribution, and are found in warm temperate to tropical locations, where they grow as black sooty molds on plants.

== Genera ==
With approx. species per genus in brackets.

- Achaetobotrys Bat. & Cif. (3)
- Antennulariella Woron. (5)
- Eumela Syd. (4)
