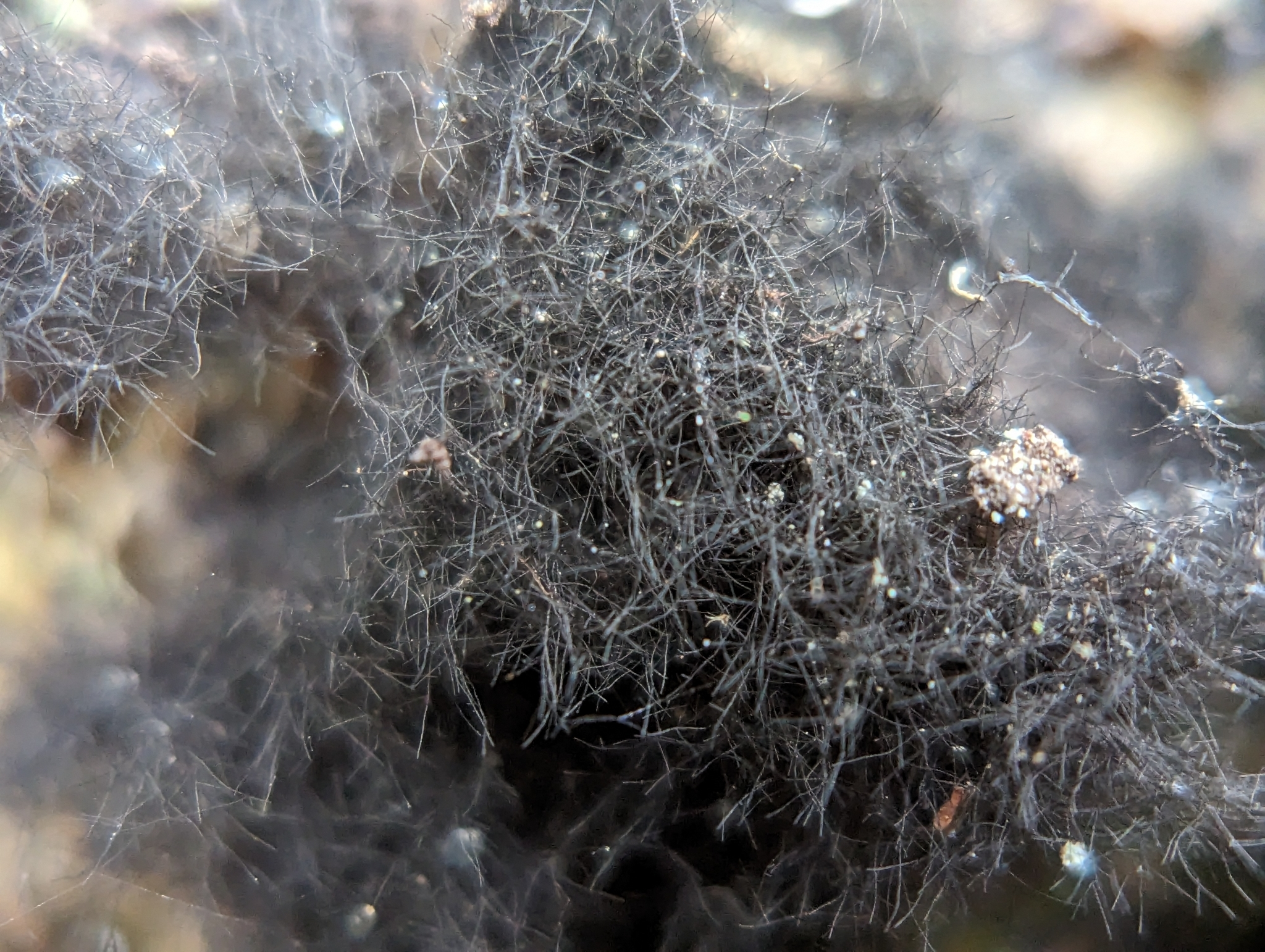

Scientific classification
- Kingdom: Fungi
- Division: Ascomycota
- Class: Dothideomycetes
- Order: Racodiales; Abdollahz. & Crous (2020)
- Family: Racodiaceae; Link (1826)
- Genus: Racodium; Fr. (1829)
- Species: R. rupestre

Binomial name
- Racodium rupestre Pers. (1794)

Synonyms
- Rhacodium Spreng. (1827); Rhacodiopsis Donk (1975)

= Racodium =

Single-species lichen genus

Racodium is a monotypic fungal genus in the family Racodiaceae, which is itself the sole family of the order Racodiales. The genus contains a single species, Racodium rupestre, a distinctive filamentous lichen that forms dark, thread-like growths on rocks by closely enveloping filaments of the green algal genus Trentepohlia. The name has a complex taxonomic history, having been used for both this rock-dwelling lichen and an unrelated cellar fungus, until nomenclature experts formally conserved Racodium for the lichen genus in 2011. Modern DNA studies place this unusual lichen close to the Capnodiales, where it represents such a distinct evolutionary lineage that it has been assigned its own order and family.

== Taxonomy ==
Racodium was introduced by the mycologist Christiaan Hendrik Persoon for a distinctive, thread-forming lichen that envelops filaments of the green algal species of genus Trentepohlia; the type species is R. rupestre. Modern DNA work places these filamentous lichens within the order Capnodiales, but the two superficially similar genera have different positions there: Cystocoleus sits within Teratosphaeriaceae, whereas Racodium is more basal in the order and currently treated as incertae sedis (meaning "of uncertain placement"). Racodium has vertically arranged hyphae with smooth, non-corrugated walls and no lateral spines, whereas Cystocoleus has twisted hyphae with corrugated, warty walls; Racoleus also has vertical, smooth-walled hyphae but bears lateral spines and is tropical in distribution, in contrast to the temperate–subboreal ranges of Racodium and Cystocoleus.

The name's history is unusually tangled because Racodium was used in parallel for two unrelated organisms: lichenologists applied it to the rock-dwelling lichen (R. rupestre), while many mycologists used it for the non-lichenised "cellar fungus" (R. cellare). To settle this conflict, Hawksworth and Riedl argued that the genus should be fixed (typified) by the lichen, not the cellar mould; their conservation proposal was accepted under the botanical code. As a result, Racodium is now conserved (nom. cons.) for the lichen genus, and the cellar fungus is referred to elsewhere—sterile material under Zasmidium cellare, and its conidial (spore-forming) state as Rhinocladiella ellisii; molecular data place that fungus with Ramichloridium species. An older spelling, Rhacodium, is treated as an orthographic variant and not used for the conserved name.

Because Persoon's original material contained mixtures of Racodium and Cystocoleus, a practical problem since the two often grow intermingled, Hawksworth and co-authors examined Persoon's specimens and designated as lectotype (a single, later-chosen name-bearing specimen) the sheet in which Racodium clearly predominates. That lectotypification fixes the application of R. rupestre and, by extension, stabilises Racodium as the name for the lichenised genus. The paper also lists historical synonyms (e.g., Rhacodium as an orthographic variant and Rhacodiopsis as illegitimate) and clarifies that several early uses of "Byssus/Cystocoleus/Coenogonium nigra" refer only pro parte to this taxon, reflecting the long-standing confusion.

In 2020, Abdollahzadeh and colleagues formally circumscribed a new order, Racodiales, to accommodate the Racodium lineage within the Capnodiales. The order (named for Racodium) comprises the family Racodiaceae with Racodium as its type genus. They diagnosed the group by its thread-like lichen body (thallus) made of straight, longitudinally aligned fungal threads (hyphae) closely sheathing the photobiont; the thallus lacks a differentiated cortex (outer "skin") and forms dark brown to black wefts or circular patches without a sharp margin, with about 4–7 unbranched, non-nodulose hyphae surrounding each algal filament. Sexual and asexual fruiting bodies (ascomata and conidiomata) remain unknown. Their sequence data supported this lineage as distinct enough to merit its own order and followed the typification issues discussed by Hawksworth and co-authors in 2011.
