= Dryadaula irinae =

Scientific classification
- Kingdom: Animalia
- Phylum: Arthropoda
- Class: Insecta
- Order: Lepidoptera
- Family: Tineidae
- Genus: Dryadaula
- Species: D. irinae

Binomial name
- Dryadaula irinae (Savenkov, 1989)

Species of moth

Dryadaula irinae is a moth belonging to the family Tineidae. The species was first described by Nikolaj Savenkov in 1989.

It is native to Europe.
