= Anariste =

Scientific classification
- Kingdom: Fungi
- Division: Ascomycota
- Class: Dothideomycetes
- Order: Asterinales
- Family: Asterinaceae
- Genus: Anariste; Syd.
- Species: A. poliothea

Binomial name
- Anariste poliothea Syd.

Genus of fungi

Anariste is a genus of fungi in the Asterinaceae family. The relationship of this taxon to other taxa within the class is unknown (incertae sedis), and it has not yet been placed with certainty into any order. This is a monotypic genus, containing the single species Anariste poliothea.
