= Piedra =

- Other names: Trichosporosis
- Specialty: Dermatology

Piedra is a hair disease caused by a fungus, which causes formation of nodules on the hair shaft.

Types include:

- White piedra
- Black piedra
