= Cystocoleus =

Scientific classification
- Kingdom: Fungi
- Division: Ascomycota
- Class: Dothideomycetes
- Order: Capnodiales
- Family: Cystocoleaceae; Locq. ex Lücking, B.P.Hodk. & S.D.Leav. (2016)
- Genus: Cystocoleus; Thwaites (1849)
- Species: C. ebeneus

Binomial name
- Cystocoleus ebeneus (Dillwyn) Thwaites (1849)

Single-species fungal genus

Cystocoleus is a fungal genus in the family Cystocoleaceae. The genus was established in 1849 by the British botanist G.H.K. Thwaites and is now considered to contain only one species, Cystocoleus ebeneus. These fungi form minute, sooty-brown to black patches made up of densely packed, brittle filaments that have a fluffy, felt-like appearance. They typically grow on shaded rock faces or damp bark near running water.

== Taxonomy ==
The genus Cystocoleus was erected in 1849 by the British botanist G.H.K. Thwaites, who based it on the peculiar filamentous lichen then known as Cystocoleus ebeneus. Thwaites' concept has remained essentially intact: the type and–in modern treatments–only unequivocal species is C. ebeneus. Although Index Fungorum briefly recognised up to three names in the genus, subsequent revisions have shown those extra taxa to lack convincing diagnostic traits, and current authors regard Cystocoleus as effectively monospecific.

Morphologically, Cystocoleus was long compared with the equally filamentous lichen Racodium rupestre, but the two differ in the degree of hyphal contortion: Cystocoleus has shorter, less twisted hyphae tightly enveloping the algal filament. Molecular work has moved the genus away from traditional lichen families. A multigene analysis placed C. ebeneus within the order Capnodiales of the class Dothideomycetes, far from most lichen-forming groups. Crous and co-workers (2009) recovered it in the family Teratosphaeriaceae, whereas Hyde and colleagues (2013) treated it as Capnodiales incertae sedis—a phrase indicating that its exact familial position remains uncertain.

Robert Lücking, Brian Hodkinson, and Steven Leavitt subsequently validated the family name Cystocoleaceae in 2016, correcting Marcel Locquin's 1984 description that had been ruled invalid under the botanical Code.

== Description ==
Cystocoleus grows as minute, sooty-brown to black patches made up of densely packed, brittle filaments that sit on the surface of the substrate rather than penetrating it. Each filament measures about 9–21 micrometres (μm) across and can branch in a spiky, sympodial fashion. The fungal partner wraps the algal strand in a single, tight sheath of hyaline (colourless) hyphae whose walls are thick, smooth and characteristically corrugated, giving the filaments a distinctly nodular outline. These hyphae are themselves only 3–7 μm wide and clasp the orange-pigmented Trentepohlia photobiont along the full length of each filament. Because the thallus is entirely filamentous and lacks the flattened plates seen in many lichens, the whole colony has a fluffy, felt-like appearance when viewed with a hand lens.

Close inspection shows no additional surface structures such as spines, and reproductive bodies have yet to be observed in confirmed collections, so the species is presently known only in its sterile state. The absence of visible spores means that identification relies on the unique filament architecture: dark, brittle strands of Trentepohlia algae entirely ensheathed by contorted, nodulose fungal hyphae.

The family Cystocoleaceae is defined as a lichenised member of the Capnodiales with a strictly filamentose thallus: each orange-tinged Trentepohlia algal strand is wrapped in a closed, single-cell-thick sheath of slightly contorted, interlocking hyphae that resemble jigsaw pieces. No sexual (ascomata) or asexual (conidiomata) reproductive structures are yet known, and chemical spot tests have detected no secondary metabolites.

== Habitat & distribution ==
Cystocoleus ebeneus occurs on shaded rock faces or damp bark near running water. In 2024, this species was reported from the Prielbrusye National Park in the Mount Elbrus region of the Kabardino-Balkarian Republic, representing the first record of this family in the Caucasus.
