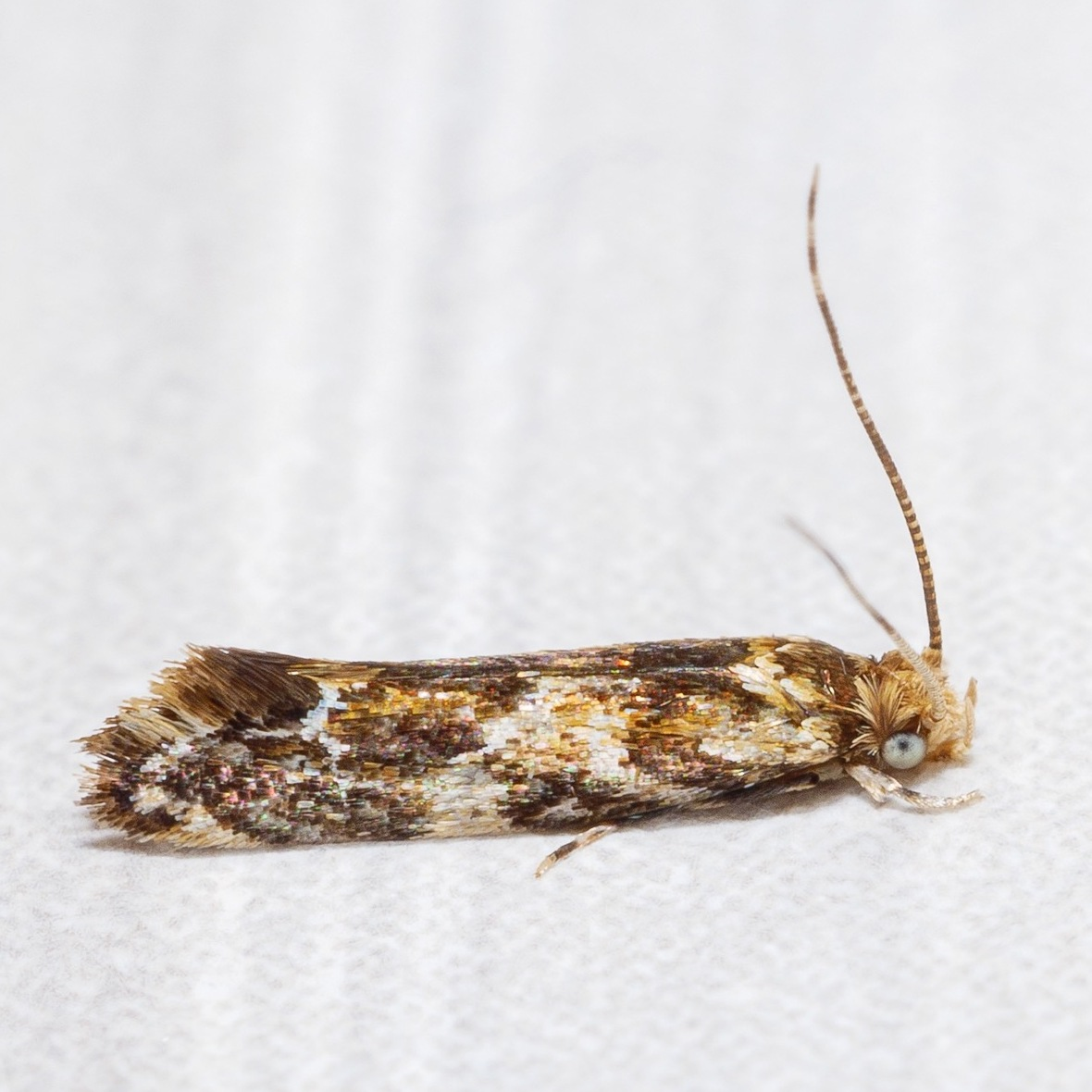

Scientific classification
- Kingdom: Animalia
- Phylum: Arthropoda
- Clade: Pancrustacea
- Class: Insecta
- Order: Lepidoptera
- Family: Tineidae
- Subfamily: Dryadaulinae
- Genus: Dryadaula; Meyrick, 1893

Type species
- Dryadaula glycinopa Meyrick, 1893

Synonyms
- Archimeessia Zagulajev, 1970; Chorocosma Meyrick, 1893; Choropleca Durrant, 1914; Cyane V.T. Chambers, 1873; Diachalastis Meyrick, 1920; Ditrigonophora Walsingham, 1897; Opsodoca Meyrick, 1919; Strophalinga Gozmany & Vári, 1973; Thermocrates Meyrick, 1936

= Dryadaula =

Genus of moths

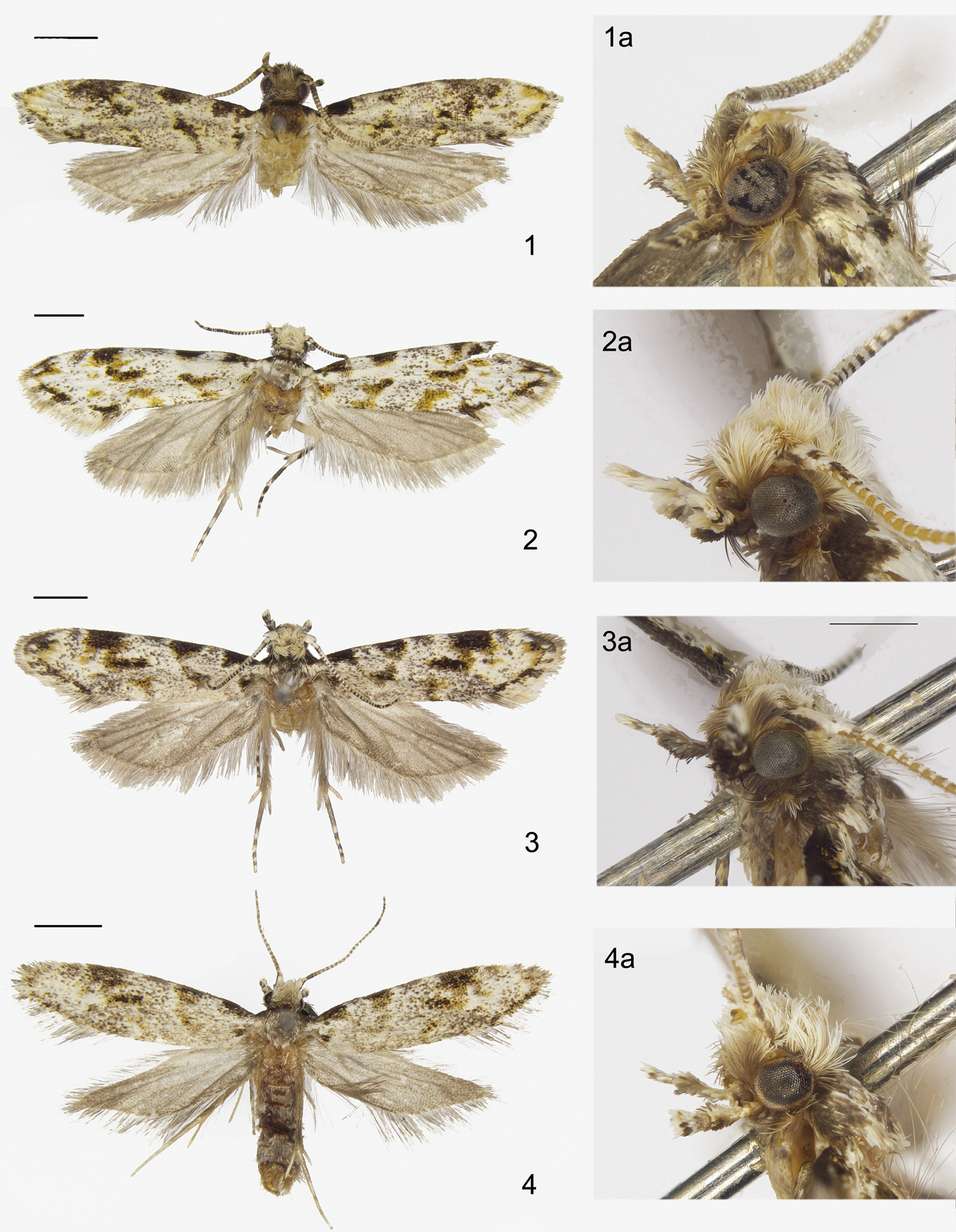
Adults of Dryadaula species

Dryadaula are a genus of moths belonging to the family Tineidae. It was described by Edward Meyrick in 1893, and it belongs to the subfamily or family Dryadaulidae, according to most recent taxonomies.

== Species ==
- Dryadaula acrodisca (Meyrick, 1917)
- Dryadaula advena (Zimmerman, 1978)
- Dryadaula amentata (Meyrick, 1919)
- Dryadaula anthracorma Meyrick, 1915
- Dryadaula auriformis Yang & Li, 2021
- Dryadaula boviceps (Walsingham, 1914)
- Dryadaula bronctotypa (Meyrick, 1880)
- Dryadaula castanea Philpott, 1915
- Dryadaula catorthota (Meyrick, 1917)
- Dryadaula caucasica (Zagulajev, 1970)
- Dryadaula discatella (Walker, 1864)
- Dryadaula epischista (Meyrick, 1936)
- Dryadaula epixantha (Turner, 1923)
- Dryadaula flavostriata Yang & Li, 2021
- Dryadaula germana (Walsingham, 1914)
- Dryadaula glycinocoma (Meyrick, 1932)
- Dryadaula glycinopa Meyrick, 1893
- Dryadaula heindeli Gaedike & Scholz, 1998
- Dryadaula hellenica (Gaedike, 1988)
- Dryadaula hirtiglobosa Yang & Li, 2021
- Dryadaula irinae (Savenkov, 1989)
- Dryadaula isodisca (Meyrick, 1917)
- Dryadaula koreana Roh & Byun, 2020
- Dryadaula marmoreipennis (Walsingham, 1897)
- Dryadaula melanorma (Meyrick, 1893)
- Dryadaula mesosticha (Turner, 1923)
- Dryadaula metrodoxa (Meyrick, 1919)
- Dryadaula minuta Gaedike, 2007
- Dryadaula multifurcata Gaedike, 2000
- Dryadaula murenula (Meyrick, 1924)
- Dryadaula myrrhina Meyrick, 1905
- Dryadaula orientalis Park & Yagi, 2024 (from Japan)
- Dryadaula napaea Meyrick, 1905
- Dryadaula nedae (Gaedike, 1983)
- Dryadaula pactolia Meyrick, 1901
- Dryadaula panscia (Meyrick, 1917)
- Dryadaula placens (Meyrick, 1920)
- Dryadaula poecilta (Walsingham, 1914)
- Dryadaula rhombifera (Meyrick, 1917)
- Dryadaula securiformis Yang & Li, 2021
- Dryadaula selenophanes (Meyrick, 1880)
- Dryadaula sublimis (Meyrick, 1917)
- Dryadaula terpsichorella (Busck, 1910)
- Dryadaula trapezoides (Meyrick, 1935)
- Dryadaula tripudians (Meyrick, 1924)
- Dryadaula ussurica Gaedike, 2000
- Dryadaula visaliella (Chambers, 1873)
- Dryadaula zinica (Zagulajev, 1970)
- Dryadaula zygodes (Meyrick, 1918)
- Dryadaula zygoterma (Meyrick, 1917)
