= Hair disease =

- Hair follicle
- Specialty: Medical genetics

Hair diseases are illnesses that impact the persistence and regular growth of hair. Types of hair diseases include folliculitis, hirsutism, hypertrichosis, hypotrichosis (alopecia), Menkes kinky hair syndrome, monilethrix, and piedra.

== Folliculitis ==
Folliculitis is an inflammatory response that occurs in the hair follicle's superficial part and may affect either the perifollicular or follicular opening.

== Hirsutism ==
Hirsutism is characterized as the overgrowth of terminal hair in a typical male pattern distribution on a female's face and body.

== Hypertrichosis ==
Hypertrichosis is any place of the body where there is more hair growth than is typically seen in people of the same age, race, and sex, excluding androgen-induced hair growth.

== Hypotrichosis ==
Hypotrichosis is an uncommon condition where there is little to no hair development on the head, in the places of the body where hair normally grows, such as the brows above the eyes and the edges of the eyelids.

== Menkes kinky hair syndrome ==
Menkes kinky hair syndrome is an uncommon X-linked recessive copper metabolism disease.

== Monilethrix ==
Monilethrix is an uncommon genetic condition that causes abnormalities in the shaft of the hair.

== Piedra ==
Piedra is a type of superficial fungal infection that appears as tiny nodules adhered to the hair shaft.

== See also ==
- List of cutaneous conditions
