= Piedraiaceae =

Scientific classification
- Kingdom: Fungi
- Division: Ascomycota
- Class: Dothideomycetes
- Order: Capnodiales
- Family: Piedraiaceae; Viégas ex Cif., Bat. & Camposa

Family of fungi

The Piedraiaceae is a monotypic family of fungi in the Ascomycota, class Dothideomycetes, within the Capnodiales order.

It only contains genus Piedraia Fonseca & Leão which has 2 species.
