= Dryadaula advena =

Scientific classification
- Kingdom: Animalia
- Phylum: Arthropoda
- Class: Insecta
- Order: Lepidoptera
- Family: Tineidae
- Genus: Dryadaula
- Species: D. advena

Binomial name
- Dryadaula advena (Zimmerman, 1978)

Synonyms
- Choropleca advena Zimmerman, 1978

Species of moth

Dryadaula advena is a moth of the family Tineidae. It was first described by Elwood Zimmerman in 1978. It has only been recorded from Hawaii, but might be an immigrant.

The length of the forewings is 4.5–5.5 mm.
