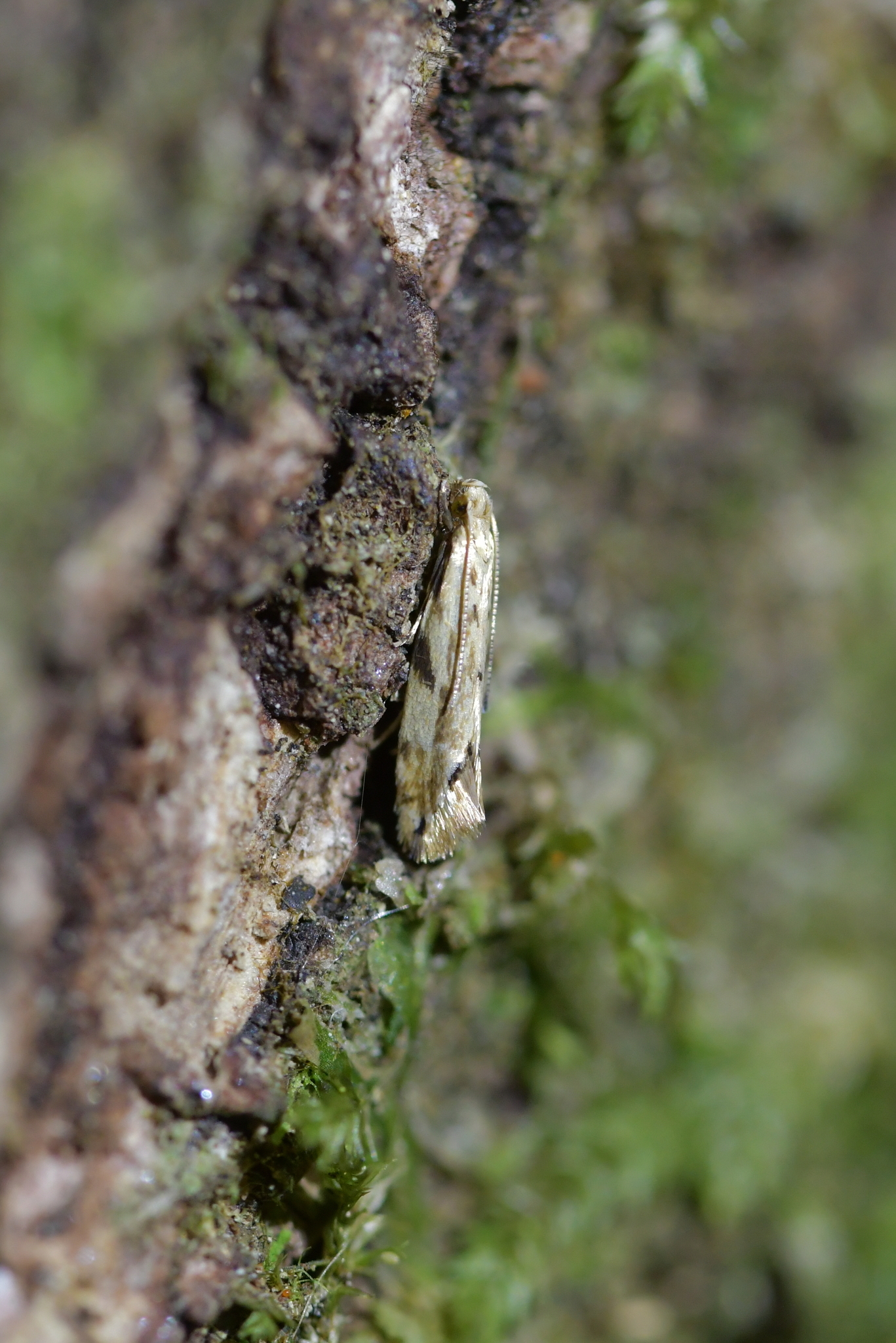

Scientific classification
- Kingdom: Animalia
- Phylum: Arthropoda
- Clade: Pancrustacea
- Class: Insecta
- Order: Lepidoptera
- Family: Tineidae
- Genus: Dryadaula
- Species: D. myrrhina

Binomial name
- Dryadaula myrrhina Meyrick, 1905

= Dryadaula myrrhina =

Species of moth endemic to New Zealand

Dryadaula myrrhina is a species of moth in the family Tineidae. It was first described by Edward Meyrick in 1905. It is endemic to New Zealand and is found in the North and South Islands. D. myrrhina inhabits native forest. It has been hypothesised that the larvae of this species may feed on detritus, leaf litter or spider webs. Adults are on the wing from June to January. The adult moth has been collected from dry, overhanging banks as well as in the dead leaves hanging from the stems of Cordyline indivisa.

== Taxonomy ==
This species was first described by Edward Meyrick in 1905 using a specimen collected by George Hudson in Wellington. In 1927 Alfred Philpott discussed and illustrated the male genitalia of this species. George Hudson discussed and illustrated this species in his 1928 book The butterflies and moths of New Zealand. The male holotype is held at the Natural History Museum, London.

== Description ==
Adult moth at rest.

Illustration of female by Hudson.

Meyrick described the adult male of this species as follows:

♂. 9mm. Head, palpi, antennae, and thorax ochreous-whitish. (Abdomen broken.) Fore-wings elongate, rather narrow, costa gently arched, apex round-pointed, termen faintly sinuate, extremely oblique; 7 and 8 separate ; shining, whitish-yellowish ; two very oblique triangular fuscous spots on costa about 1/5 and before middle ; a fuseous dot above dorsum at 1/3; an inwardly oblique fuscous strigula on dorsum at 2/3; a fuscous costal dot at 3/4; some indistinct brownish suffusion on dorsal half posteriorly and towards apex; a thick black terminal line, interrupted below apex and in middle: cilia whitish-yellowish. Hind-wings trapezoidal, termen faintly sinuate below apex ; light grey ; cilia grey-whitish.

This species is varies considerably in ground colour which in some specimens can be nearly white on both fore and hind wings.

== Distribution ==
This species is endemic to New Zealand and is found in the North and South Islands.

== Habitat and hosts ==
D. myrrhina inhabits native forest. Hudson observed that this species frequents dry, overhanging banks, usually where a tree has been undermined by a slip and roots are left hanging in the air. Such places are nearly always infested by spiders and their webs and he hypothesised that the larva may feed on the spider's webs, or the refuse contained in them. This moth has also been collected from around the dead leaves hanging from the stems of Cordyline indivisa.

== Behaviour ==
Adults are on the wing from June to January.
