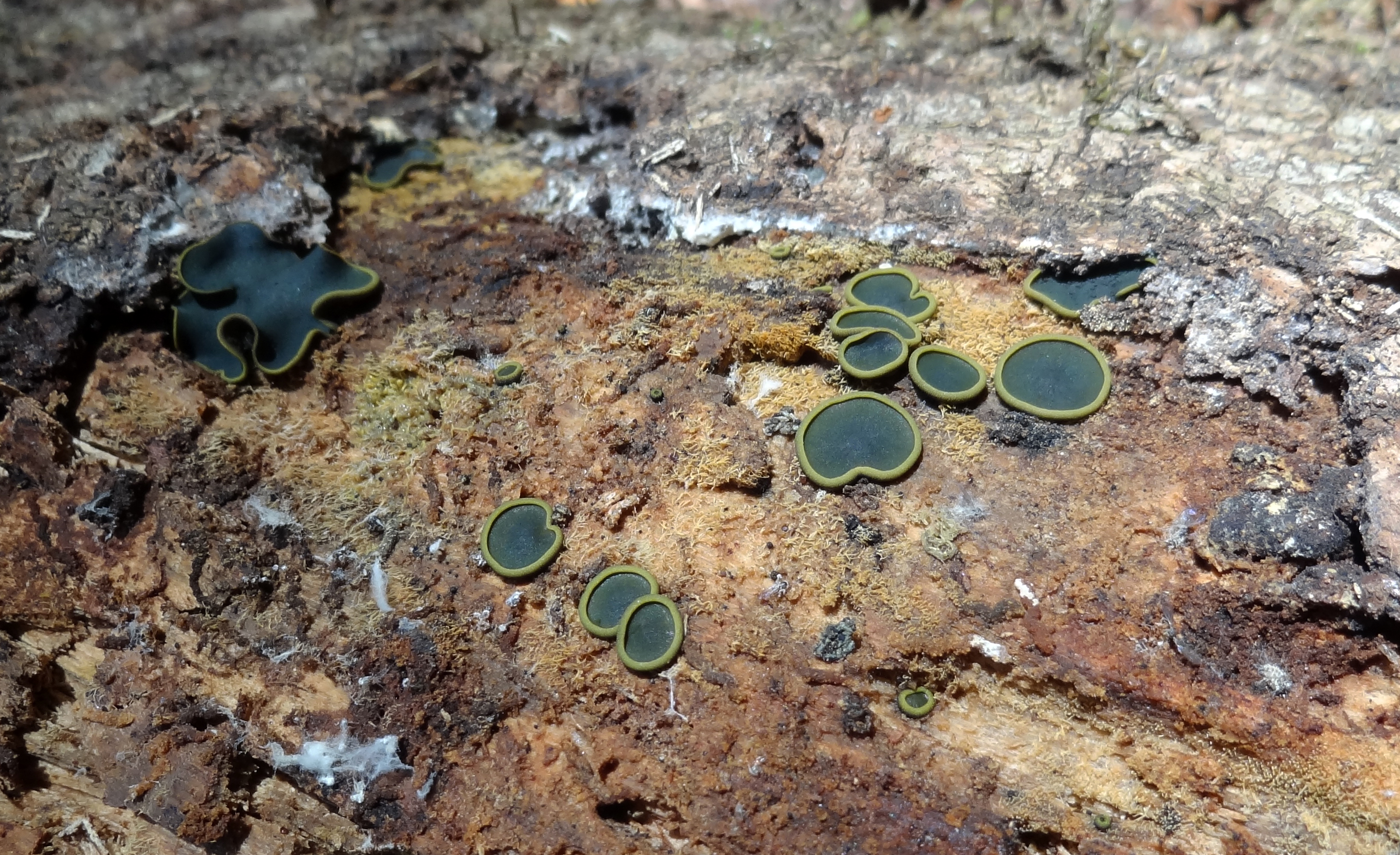
- Catinella olivacea

Scientific classification
- Kingdom: Fungi
- Division: Ascomycota
- Class: Dothideomycetes
- Order: Catinellales; Ekanayaka, K.D. Hyde & Ariy.
- Family: Catinellaceae; Ekanayaka, K.D. Hyde & Ariy.
- Genus: Catinella; Boud.

Type species
- Catinella olivacea (Batsch) Boud.

= Catinella (fungus) =

Genus of fungi

Catinella is a genus of fungi in the class Dothideomycetes. It is placed in the monotypic family Catinellaceae in the monotypic order Catinellales.

== Species ==
As accepted by Species Fungorum;

- Catinella melanochlora (Boedijn) Gamundí (1981)
- Catinella nigro-olivacea (Schwein.) E.J. Durand (1922)
- Catinella olivacea (Batsch) Boud. (1907)

Former species;

- C. elastica (Pat. & Gaillard) E.J. Durand (1922) = Peziza elastica, Pezizaceae
- C. olivacea f. carbonicola (Torrend) Gamundí (1981) = Catinella olivacea
- C. olivacea f. pilosa (Syd. & P. Syd.) Gamundí (1981) = Catinella olivacea
