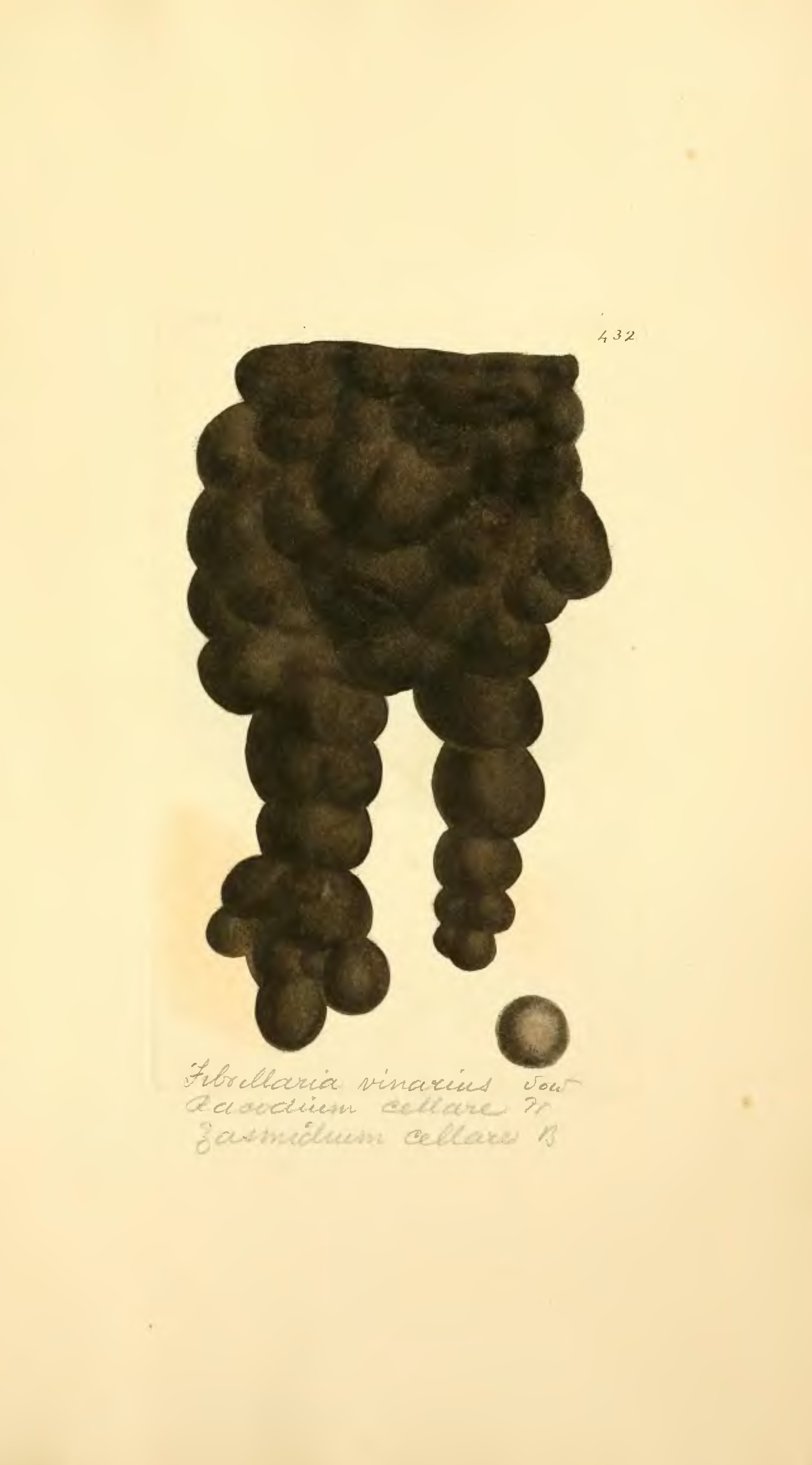

Scientific classification
- Kingdom: Fungi
- Division: Ascomycota
- Class: Dothideomycetes
- Order: Mycosphaerellales
- Family: Mycosphaerellaceae
- Genus: Zasmidium
- Species: Z. cellare

Binomial name
- Zasmidium cellare (Pers.) Fries (1849)

Synonyms
- Racodium cellare (Pers.) (1794); Antennaria cellaris (Pers.) (1829); Cladosporium cellare (Pers.) Schanderl (1936); Rhinocladiella cellaris (Pers.) Ellis (1971); Rhinocladiella ellisii Hawksworth (1971)

= Zasmidium cellare =

Species of fungus

Zasmidium cellare, also known as cellar mold, is a species of fungus that exists in dark, ethanol-rich environments and is brown to black in colour. This species primarily exists in wine and brandy cellars in central and southern Europe, but can be found in surrounding regions and is thought to be helpful in the wine-making process by some and a hygienic issue by others. Not much is known about Z. cellare's sexual biology and is thought to be beneficial to the cleanliness of cellar air due to its ability to consume musty odours.

== Taxonomic history ==
Zasmidium cellare was originally classified by C. H. Persoon in 1794 under the name Racodium cellare – Racodium being a classification for plants that have no real relation or resemblance to each other. It would not be long, however, before Persoon retracted his original name, assigning Antennaria cellaris - another plant genus designation. It wasn't until Elias Fries that this species was designated correctly as a fungus under the name Zasmidium cellare in 1849.

Over the years, there has been much contention over this classification, however. The first was Hugo Schanderl in 1936 who claimed that the genus Cladosporium was more fitting than Zasmidium. Though Cladosporiums can be common indoor molds with brown or black colonies and have dark, pigmented conidia, that is where the similarities with Z. cellare end. Cladosporiums usually exist on plant material and their spores are often air dispersed, having a large abundance in outdoor environments, which simply isn't the case for Z. cellare. The second and third claim that Z. cellare was characterized incorrectly both occurred in 1971 by M. B. Ellis and Hawksworth who proposed Rhinocladiella cellaris and Rhinocladiella ellisii, respectively. Hawksworth along with Riedl in 1977 re-proposed Rhinocladiella ellisii, but in 1979 was criticized by De Hoog as the genus Rhinocladiella characterized Z. cellare's asexual (conidial) form of which the fungus rarely presents in and decided that Z. cellare was the most appropriate name for this species. To prevent any further contention, de Hoog amended the genus Zasmidium to include fungi with undifferentiated conidiogenous cells with wavy branches, "denticulate rachis", and pigmented scars.

Today, the literature agrees that the proper classification is in fact Zasmidium cellare of the division Ascomycota, representing spore shooting fungi; the class Dothideomycetes, which are fungi that grow in what are considered hostile or non-optimal conditions to most fungal species; the order Capnodiales, which typically grow masses of black cells; and the family Mycosphaerellaceae, which is a grouping of sac fungi.

== Growth and morphology ==
=== Growth inhibition ===
Zasmidium cellare shares many morphological characteristics with another fungus, Cladosporium sphaerospermum (commonly found on shower ceilings and can live off of the oil in paints). Though C. sphaerospermum is very hard to get rid of with rigorous cleaning, Z. cellare requires very little in the way of interference to inhibit its growth, as even the slightest bit of care for the cleanliness of a cellar can prevent traces of the organism. The use of steel tanks for aging is also another inhibitor of Z. cellare growth, as steel is less porous than wood and prevents alcohol vapour from diffusing into the environment, and alone can be the sole contributor to the species' extinction as claimed by Henry Tribe (2006).

=== Morphology ===
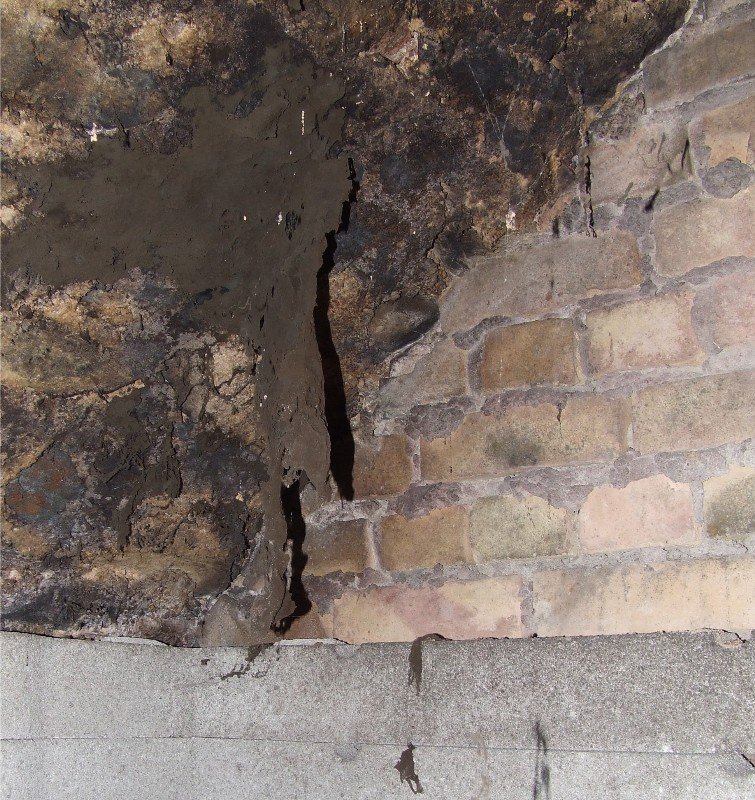

Zasmidium cellare growth typically includes hyphae (up to 5000 μm in length with walls 0.5-0.6 μm thick) with very small conidiophores, often not distinguishable from vegetative hyphae, upon which spores are produced at the end of teeth-like structures that are less pigmented than the basal portion of the conidiophore. Aerial hyphae are usually rough and darkly coloured, 2-2.5 μm wide, with thick walls, while the submerged hyphae are smooth and 2-3 μm wide. The Aerial hyphae are observed to have conidiogenous cells (thought to be remnants of conidiophores) primarily on the terminal of the hyphae, sometimes on the sides, that are cylindrical and 20-60 μm long and 2-2.5 μm wide. The structure of the colony is circular (7mm in diameter after 14 days at 24 °C in vitro), elevated and fuzzy in texture due to branched, filamentous growth. Large colonies can amalgamate into amorphous structures that optimizes the absorption of volatile compounds from the air, moving away from more circular shapes and creating sheets of mycelium, especially under very humid conditions.

In vitro, Z. cellare is characterized as being morphologically similar to Stenella araguata, which both reside in the order Capnodiales and family Mycosphaerellaceae.

== Ecology ==
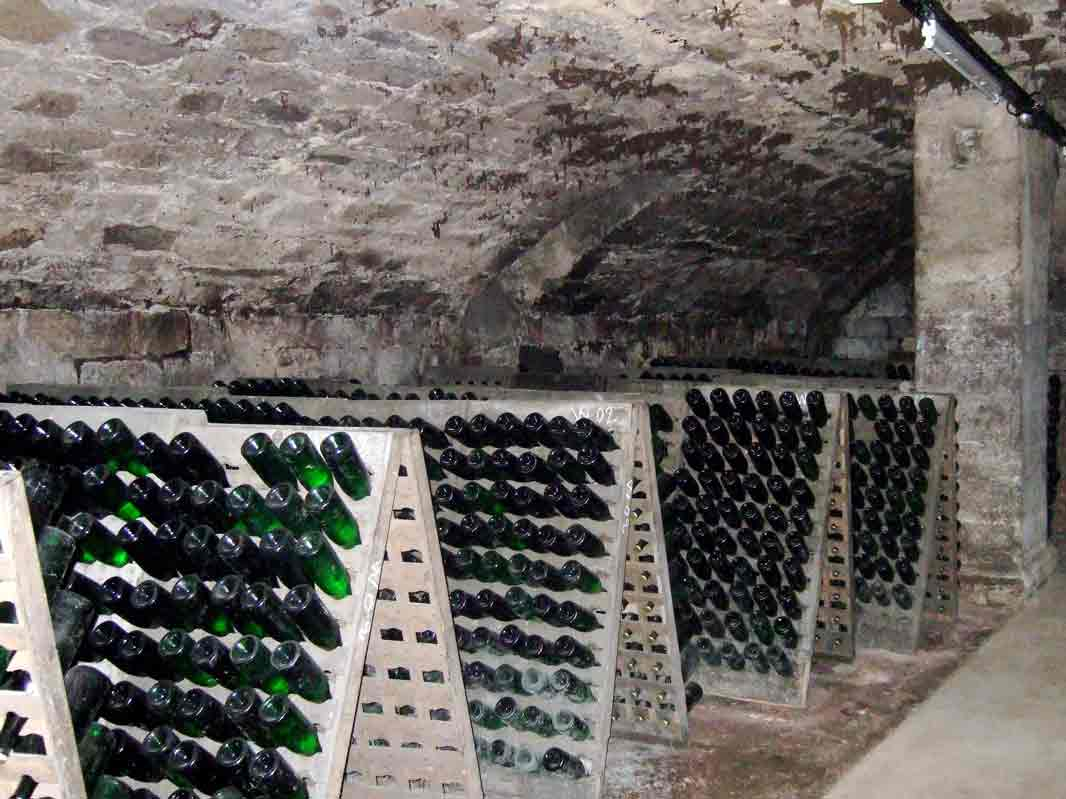
Zasmidium cellare carefully kept on the vault of a German wine cellar

Zasmidium cellare was first recorded existing is cellars in 1696. Since that time it has not spread much, existing primarily in dark, humid, ethanol-rich cellars containing barrel aged wine, brandy or other spirits of central and southern Europe, Hungary, Poland, Great Britain and Nigeria.

The presence of Z. cellare in any of these regions is completely dependent on human activity, however. For example, there are wineries in Italy that are devoid of Z. cellare but also maintain a level of cleanliness in their cellars, while other Italian wineries cherish its presence and often feed it left over wine, encouraging its proliferation. When Z. cellare is present, however, it is commonly found on brickwork and timber next to its food sources and can also, on the rare occasion, be found in nearby soil.

== Physiology ==
=== Sexual physiology ===
The sexual state of Z. cellare is difficult to define, but there seems to be a common consensus in the literature that this fungus rarely, or never, presents itself as its anamorph. With that determined, the literature is ripe with contrary findings on what the proper state of the fungus is. Some argue that there is no optimal state, inherently defining it as either amorphous or in flux between anamorph and teleomorph, while others claim that it is all together sterile, reproducing by fragmentation. There is evidence, however, that Z. cellare produces spores which could mean that it reproduces through asexual dispersal, but that is only a probable guess. What is known is that spore concentration is 2 times higher in cellars with Z. cellare than ones that do not. Further insights are awaited on this topic before the reproduction of this species is known, but this aspect of its life cycles makes Z. cellare unique among most other Ascomycota due to its difficulty to define by biology.

=== Mitochondrial genome ===
Apart from its reproduction, Z. cellare possesses an additional quality that, too, makes it distinct in its division. Of all filamentous ascomycete, Z. cellare contains the smallest known mitochondrial genome at 23 743 base pairs, which is achieved by its mitochondrial DNA coding for proteins using smaller genes - lacking introns, non-essential genes and what is known as noncoding, or junk, DNA. Furthermore, there is an unusual feature in the sequence of this mitochondrial DNA consisting of a repeated 110 base pair sequence that is inverted and separated by 1 000 base pairs. As interesting as this is in the field of genetics, this is found to not be significant in any way.

=== Food consumption and energy production ===
Primarily, the food source of Z. cellare is ethanol from the process of barrel aging, but upon further investigation it was found that Z. cellare can survive, and even thrive, on much more. Chlebicki and Majewska (2010) discovered that this fungus can utilize any volatile, oxygen-containing organic compound including various other alcohols, esters, acetic acids, acetylaldehydes, as well as formaldehyde and thymol. Out of these compounds, it is found that alcohols and acids that are three to five carbons in length are preferred by this organism, but will gladly feed on any length of the former compounds if need be. As well, concentration is not a crucial factor by any means as the typical laboratory air concentration for volatile, organic compounds is enough for Z. cellare to grow.

Given that alcohols are the fungus's main food source, it is likely that the organism produces energy via the citric acid cycle, where ethanol is converted to acetaldehyde, then to acetic acid, then to acetyl-CoA via various enzymatic pathways which then joins the citric acid cycle to create energy for the organism from the oxidation of acetyl-CoA. However, this is not proven.

== Pathology ==
Zasmidium cellare has no recorded pathological effect on healthy individuals and has long been considered beneficial to human health by traditional, European winemakers who found a correspondence to the presence of this fungi and the elimination of musty odours. Schanderl (1950) saw it as proof that the volatile food sources of Z. cellare backed up this claim and too considered the presence of this fungus to be beneficial to human health. However, in unhealthy individuals such as English physician Sir John Floyer, the presence of Z. cellare had different consequences for him. In his essay A Treatise of the Asthma (1698), he mentions that being in the vicinity of a cellar, which at that time in Great Britain would likely be covered in Z. cellare, will trigger asthma attacks. Though this is circumstantial evidence, it is an indication that Z. cellare might cause an immunological reaction in certain predisposed individuals that biology has yet to investigate.
