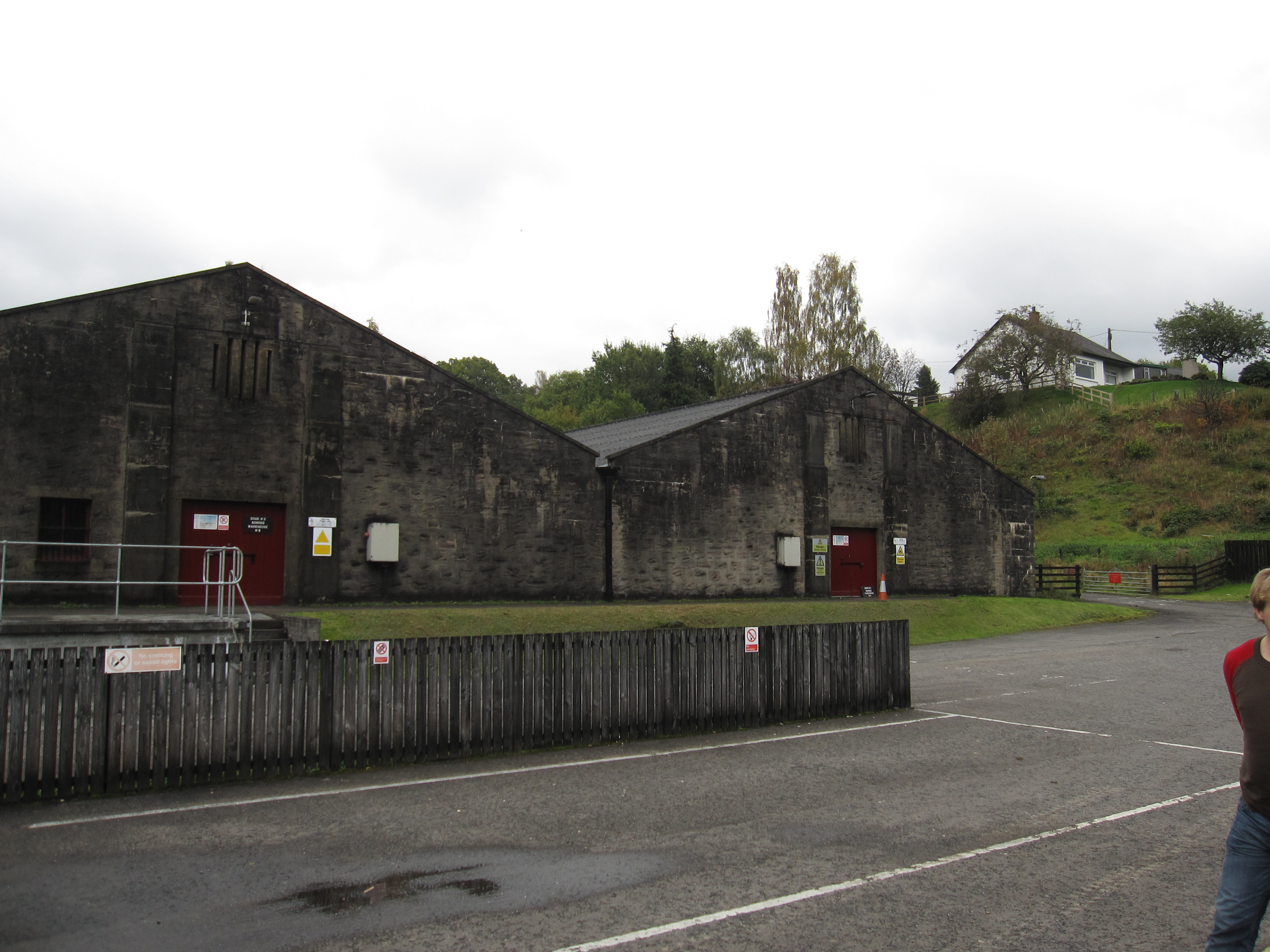
- Baudoinia compniacensis growing on Blair Athol distillery, feeding on the angel's share

Scientific classification
- Kingdom: Fungi
- Division: Ascomycota
- Class: Dothideomycetes
- Subclass: Dothideomycetidae
- Order: Capnodiales; Woron. (1925)

= Capnodiales =

Order of fungi

Capnodiales is a diverse order of Dothideomycetes, initially based on the family Capnodiaceae, also known as sooty mold fungi. Sooty molds grow as epiphytes, forming masses of black cells on plant leaves and are often associated with the honeydew secreted by insects feeding on plant sap. This diverse order has been expanded by the addition of several families formerly thought unrelated and now also includes saprobes, endophytes, plant pathogens, lichens and rock-inhabiting fungi. The new additions include the genus Mycosphaerella containing the causal agents of several economically important crop and tree diseases. A small number of these fungi are also able to parasitise humans and animals, including species able to colonise human hair shafts (Piedraia hortae).

== Accepted families ==
- Aeminiaceae (2 genera)
- Antennulariellaceae
- Capnodiaceae
- Cladosporiaceae
- Cystocoleaceae
- Dissoconiaceae
- Euantennariaceae
- Extremaceae
- Floricolaceae
- Johansoniaceae
- Metacapnodiaceae
- Mycosphaerellaceae
- Neoantennariellaceae
- Neodevriesiaceae
- Paradevriesiaceae
- Phaeothecoidiellaceae
- Piedraiaceae
- Readerielliopsidaceae
- Teratosphaeriaceae
- Xenodevriesiaceae

== Genera incertae sedis ==
There are several genera in the Capnodiales that have not been assigned to any family:

- Anariste Syd. (1927) – 1 sp.
- Catenulomyces Egidi & de Hoog (2019) – 1 sp.
- Perusta Egidi & Stielow (2019) – 1 sp.
- Plurispermiopsis Pereira-Carv., Inácio & Dianese (2010) – 1 sp.
- Pseudoepicoccum M.B.Ellis (1971) – 4 spp.
- Racoleus R.Sant. & D.Hawksw. (2011) – 2 sp.
- Ramimonilia Stielow & Quaedvl. (2019) – 1 sp.
- Rosaria N.Carter (1922) – 1 sp.
- Stigmatodothis Syd. & P.Syd. (1914) – 1 sp.
- Stomiopeltis Theiss. (1914) – 25 spp.
