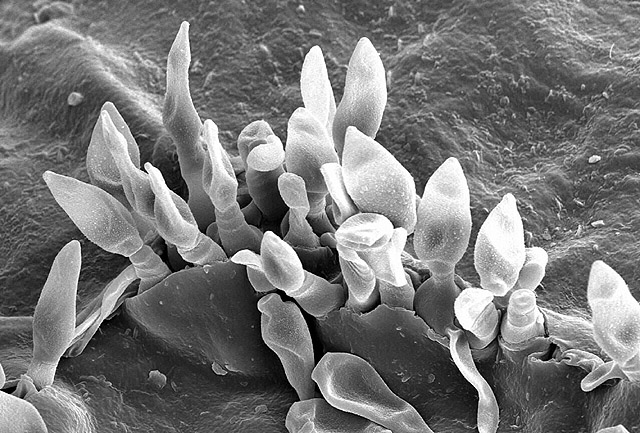
- The reproductive conidia of Venturia inaequalis erupting through the cuticle of a crabapple leaf

Scientific classification
- Kingdom: Fungi
- Division: Ascomycota
- Subdivision: Pezizomycotina
- Clade: Leotiomyceta
- (unranked): Dothideomyceta
- Class: Dothideomycetes; O.E.Erikss. & Winka (1997)

Subclasses & orders
- Dothideomycetidae Aureoconidiellales Capnodiales Cladosporiales Dothideales Mycosphaerellales Myriangiales Phaeothecales Racodiales Pleosporomycetidae Gloniales Hysteriales Mytilinidiales Pleosporales Incertae sedis Abrothallales Acrospermales Asterinales Aulographales Botryosphaeriales Catinellales Cladoriellales Collemopsidiales Coniosporiales Dyfrolomycetales Eremithallales Eremomycetales Jahnulales Kirschsteiniotheliales Lembosinales Lichenotheliales Microthyriales Minutisphaerales Monoblastiales Muyocopronales Parmulariales Patellariales Phaeotrichales Strigulales Stigmatodiscales Trypetheliales Tubeufiales Valsariales Venturiales

= Dothideomycetes =

Class of fungi

Dothideomycetes is the largest and most diverse class of ascomycete fungi. It comprises 11 orders 90 families, 1,300 genera and over 19,000 known species. Wijayawardene et al. in 2020 added more orders to the class.

Traditionally, most of its members were included in the loculoascomycetes, which is not part of the currently accepted classification. This indicates that several traditional morphological features in the class are not unique and DNA sequence comparisons are important to define the class.

The designation loculoascomycetes was first proposed for all fungi which have ascolocular development. This type of development refers to the way in which the sexual structure, bearing the sexual spores (ascospores) forms. Dothideomycetes mostly produce flask-like structures referred to as pseudothecia, although other shape variations do exist (e.g. see structures found in Hysteriales). During ascolocular development pockets (locules) form first within the vegetative cells of the fungus and then all the subsequent structures form. These include the asci which, superficially, have a thicker outer layer through which a thinner inner layer 'bursts', like a jack-in-a-box to release the spores. These asci are therefore referred to as bitunicate (superficially, two layers) or fissitunicate (referring to spore release). After several DNA sequence comparisons it is now clear that another group of fungi which share these characteristics are distantly related. These are the "black yeasts" in subclass Chaetothyriomycetidae (Eurotiomycetes). This means that loculoascomycetes did not constitute a natural group.

The best known members of this class are several important plant pathogens (like Phaeosphaeria nodorum and Venturia inaequalis). However, a majority of described species are either found as endophytes or saprobes growing on woody debris, decaying leaves or dung. A smaller number exist as lichens and a single species, Cenococcum geophilum, can form mycorrhizal associations with plant roots.

== See also ==
- List of Dothideomycetes taxa incertae sedis
