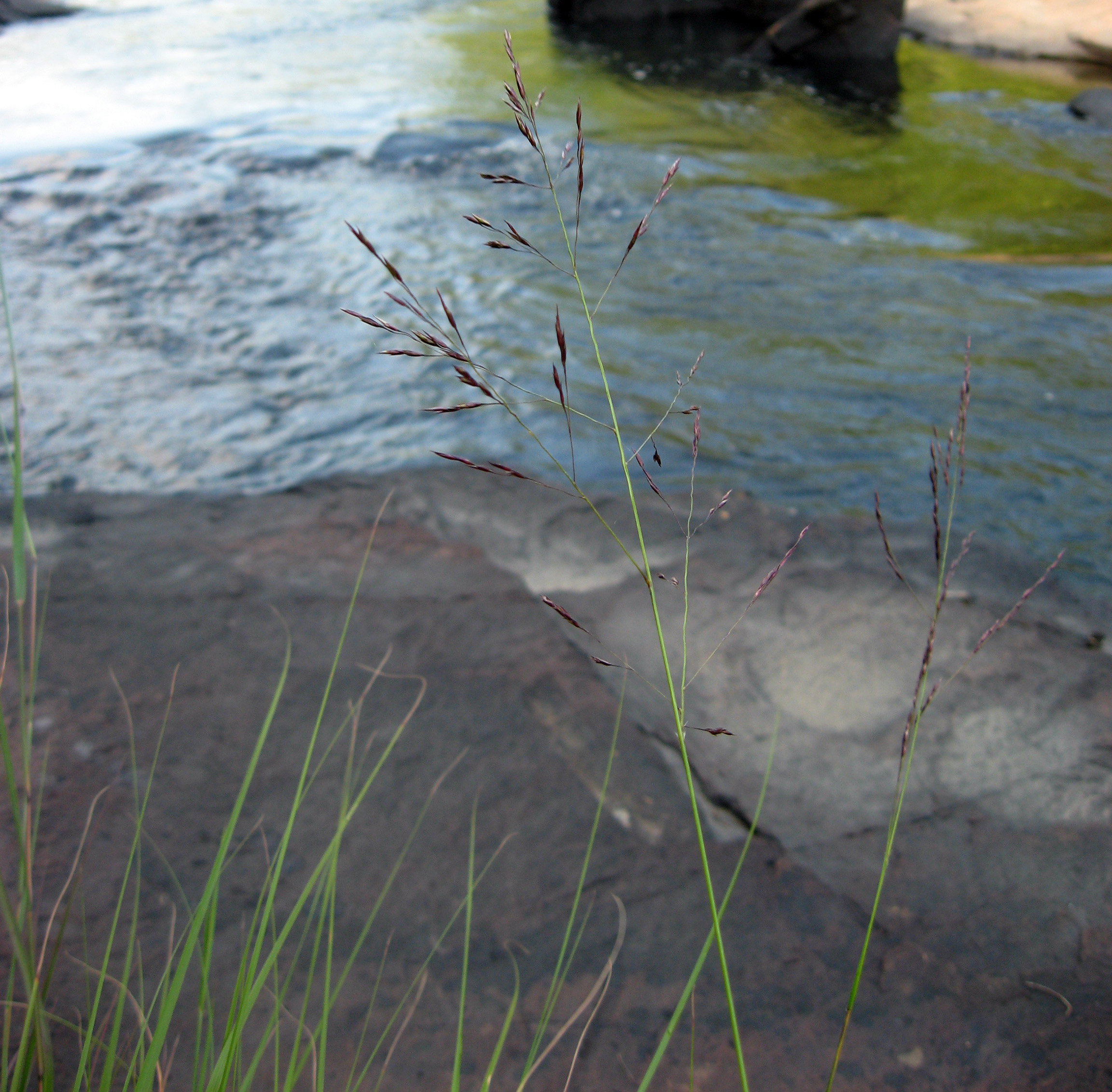

Conservation status
- Imperiled (NatureServe)

Scientific classification
- Kingdom: Plantae
- Clade: Tracheophytes
- Clade: Angiosperms
- Clade: Monocots
- Clade: Commelinids
- Order: Poales
- Family: Poaceae
- Genus: Calamovilfa
- Species: C. arcuata

Binomial name
- Calamovilfa arcuata K.E. Rogers

Synonyms
- Sporobolus arcuatus

= Calamovilfa arcuata =

Species of grass

Calamovilfa arcuata, commonly known as Cumberland sandreed, is a species of flowering plant in the grass family. It is native to the southeastern United States, where it is found in river scour zones. Due to its specialized habitat, it has a highly localized range, found only on the Cumberland Plateau and in the Ouachita Mountains.

== Natural history ==
This species is found only is a specialized riverine habitat that is kept open by extreme flood scouring events. These flood events naturally occur in high-gradient, rocky rivers, which results in the prevention of large tree growth. This species takes advantage of the prairie-like openings these floods create. Due to its specialized habitat, and low density of populations, Calamovilfa arcuata is considered imperiled. On the Cumberland Plateau, it is most often found on sandstone cobble where it co-occurs with two other rare plants that are also restricted to this habitat: Conradina verticillata (Cumberland rosemary) and Solidago arenicola (sand goldenrod).

This species produces flowers in late summer, at the time when the chances of a scouring flood occurring are lessened.

== Taxonomy ==
Calamovilfa arcuata was first described to science in 1970 from a population found on Daddys Creek in Cumberland County, Tennessee. Recent genetic evidence suggests that this species, along with the rest of the genus Calamofilva, are perhaps best instead included in the genus Sporobolus, although this change has yet to receive widespread recognition.
