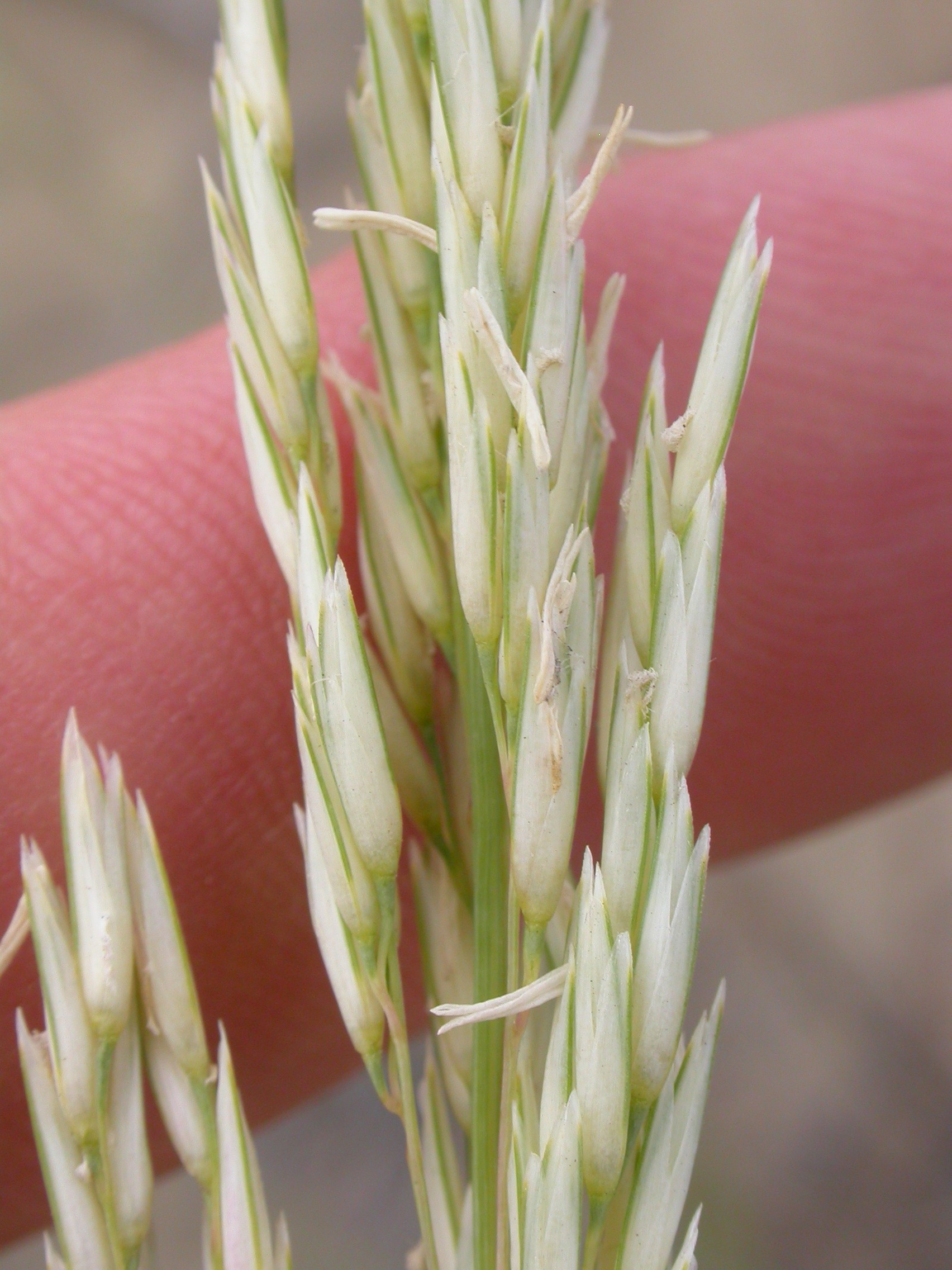
- Calamovilfa longifolia

Scientific classification
- Kingdom: Plantae
- Clade: Tracheophytes
- Clade: Angiosperms
- Clade: Monocots
- Clade: Commelinids
- Order: Poales
- Family: Poaceae
- Genus: Calamovilfa (A.Gray) Hack. ex Scribn. & Southw.

Type species
- Calamovilfa brevipilis (A.Gray) Hack. ex Scribn. & Southw.

Synonyms
- Calamagrostis subg. Calamovilfa A.Gray; Sporobolus sect. Calamovilfa (A.Gray) P.M.Peterson; Sporobolus subsect. Calamovilfa (A.Gray) P.M. Peterson

= Calamovilfa =

Genus of grasses

Calamovilfa is a genus of North American plants in the grass family native to the United States and Canada.

Species

- Calamovilfa arcuata K.E.Rogers - OK AL AR TN GA KY
- Calamovilfa brevipilis (Torr.) Scribn. - NJ NC SCA VA
- Calamovilfa curtissii (Vasey) Scribn. - Florida
- Calamovilfa gigantea (Nutt.) Scribn. & Merr. - COL KS NE OK AZ UT NM TX
- Calamovilfa longifolia (Hook.) Scribn. - ABT BRC MAN SAS ONT COL ID MT WA WY IL IA KS MN MO ND NE SD WI IN MI NY OH PA NM

formerly included

see Cinna

- Calamovilfa poiformis - syn of Cinna poiformis

== See also ==
- List of Poaceae genera
