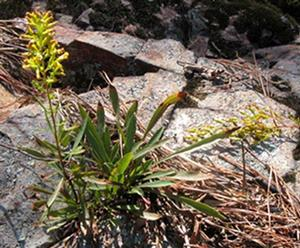

Conservation status
- Critically Imperiled (NatureServe)

Scientific classification
- Kingdom: Plantae
- Clade: Tracheophytes
- Clade: Angiosperms
- Clade: Eudicots
- Clade: Asterids
- Order: Asterales
- Family: Asteraceae
- Genus: Solidago
- Species: S. plumosa

Binomial name
- Solidago plumosa Small

= Solidago plumosa =

Species of flowering plant

Solidago plumosa is a rare species of goldenrod known by the common names Yadkin River goldenrod, plumed goldenrod, and plumose goldenrod. It is endemic to North Carolina in the United States, where it grows only on the banks of the Yadkin River. There is only one known population. It is a candidate for federal protection.

== Description ==
This plant is a perennial herb with an erect, ridged, mostly hairless, purple-colored stem up to one meter tall, sometimes growing in tufts. The alternately-arranged leaves are spatula-shaped to linear in shape and measure up to 30 centimeters long. They are smooth-edged or toothed. The inflorescence is a panicle of many flower heads with yellow petals each about half a centimeter long.

== Taxonomy ==
Initially classified by John Kunkel Small and placed in genus Solidago, Solidago plumosa is placed in section Erectae subsection Erectae series Erectae. It shares close phylogenetic relationships with species Solidago arenicola and Solidago austrocaroliniana. Its taxonomy has been clarified through genetic and morphological studies published in 2021 by botanists John C. Semple and James B. Beck.

== Distribution and habitat ==
This rare plant is known only from a 2.5-mile stretch of the Yadkin River in North Carolina. It grows along the banks in cracks in the mafic bedrock. It can also anchor in concrete at the bases of local dams. It is sometimes subjected to scouring by floodwaters. It may grow alongside other plants, including Pinus virginiana (Virginia pine), Ulmus alata (winged elm), Liquidambar styraciflua (sweet-gum), Vaccinium arboreum (sparkleberry), Amorpha fruticosa (false indigo), Schizachyrium scoparium (little bluestem), Hypericum gentianoides (orangegrass), and Baptisia alba (white false indigo).

Solidago plumosa thrives in rugged, rocky outcrops along flood-scoured riverbanks. These dynamic ecosystems are periodically inundated, creating the specific conditions required for the species to survive. Such niche specialization contributes to its vulnerability to environmental changes.

== Conservation ==
Solidago plumosa grows next to two dams – the Narrows Dam and the Falls Dam part of the Yadkin chain of reservoirs. It is likely that these structures alter the normal flow regime of the river enough to constitute a threat to the species. The plant may depend on periodic flooding to scour competing vegetation. The dams prevent or reduce the frequency of these flooding events. Introduced species of plants may threaten the Solidago plumosa, particularly Albizia julibrissin (mimosa), which easily takes hold in the local riverbank habitat.

The building of the hydropower dams has affected the population of Solidago plumosa, and has become a major factor in the dramatic reduction in its population. The dam construction caused much of its habitat to be flooded. Causing it to be currently confined to a short section of the Yadkin River in Stanley County, North Carolina.

The species exhibits similarities to S. simplex var. racemosa and might even be conspecific with S. simplex, though insufficient study material have made definitive conclusions difficult. Recent findings indicate that the species remains locally abundant at its type locality, where targeted conservation efforts are underway.

Other threats to the plant include trampling by boaters and fishermen, who commonly use the immediate habitat for river access. Pollution may also occur.
