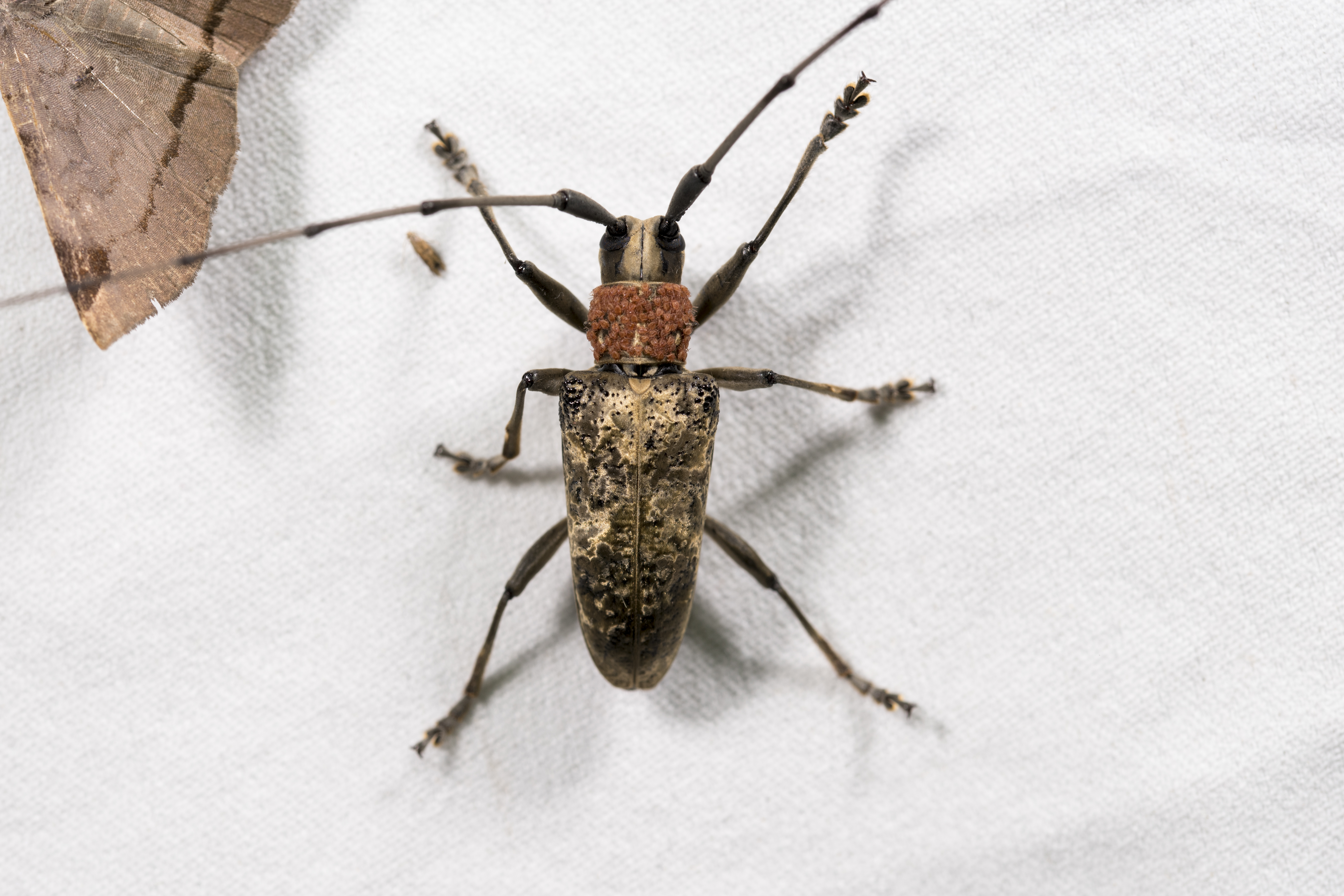

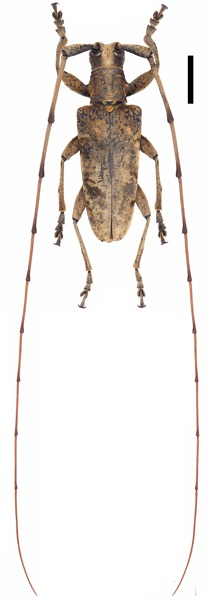

Scientific classification
- Domain: Eukaryota
- Kingdom: Animalia
- Phylum: Arthropoda
- Class: Insecta
- Order: Coleoptera
- Suborder: Polyphaga
- Infraorder: Cucujiformia
- Family: Cerambycidae
- Tribe: Lamiini
- Genus: Acalolepta
- Species: A. permutans

Binomial name
- Acalolepta permutans (Pascoe, 1857)

Synonyms
- Dihammus permutans (Pascoe) Breuning, 1943; Monochammus severini Nonfried, 1892; Monohammus permutans Pascoe, 1857; Monohammus vicinus Pascoe, 1858; Dihammus permutans okinawanus Gressitt, 1951; Dihammus teragramus Gilmour, 1951; Dihammus permutans paucipunctatus Gressitt, 1938; Dihamus semisericeus Pic, 1935; Dihammus semisericeus Breuning, 1936; Dihammus mutans Breuning, 1938; Cypriola permutans occidentalis Breuning, 1958; Acalolepta pseudospeciosa Breuning, 1965; Acalolepta paraspeciosa Breuning, 1982

= Acalolepta permutans =

Species of beetle

Acalolepta permutans is a species of beetle in the family Cerambycidae. It was described by Francis Polkinghorne Pascoe in 1857, originally under the genus Monohammus. It is known from Japan, Vietnam, Taiwan, and China. It feeds on Albizia julibrissin.

== Subspecies ==
- Acalolepta permutans occidentalis (Breuning, 1958) (China [Henan, Shaanxi, Anhui, Zhejiang, Hubei, Jiangxi, Hunan, Guangdong, Hong Kong, Guangxi, Sichuan, Guizhou], Taiwan, Vietnam, Laos)
- Acalolepta permutans okinawana (Gressitt, 1951) (Okinawa and Ryukyu Islands)
- Acalolepta permutans paucipunctata (Gressitt, 1938) (Japan, Taiwan, China [Yunnan])
- Acalolepta permutans permutans (Pascoe, 1857) (eastern India [Assam, Arunachal Pradesh], Thailand, Laos, Vietnam and south-western China [Xizang, Sichuan and Yunnan])
