= Pterolophia mandshurica =

Scientific classification
- Kingdom: Animalia
- Phylum: Arthropoda
- Clade: Pancrustacea
- Class: Insecta
- Order: Coleoptera
- Suborder: Polyphaga
- Infraorder: Cucujiformia
- Family: Cerambycidae
- Genus: Pterolophia
- Species: P. mandshurica

Binomial name
- Pterolophia mandshurica Breuning, 1938

Synonyms
- Pterolophia rigida Namhaidorzh, 1974; Pterolophia burakowskii Heyrovský, 1973; Pterolophia ussuriensis Plavilstshikov, 1954; Pterolophia selengensis Lyamtseva, 1979

Species of beetle

Pterolophia mandshurica is a species of beetle in the family Cerambycidae. It was described by Stephan von Breuning in 1938. It feeds on Albizia julibrissin.
