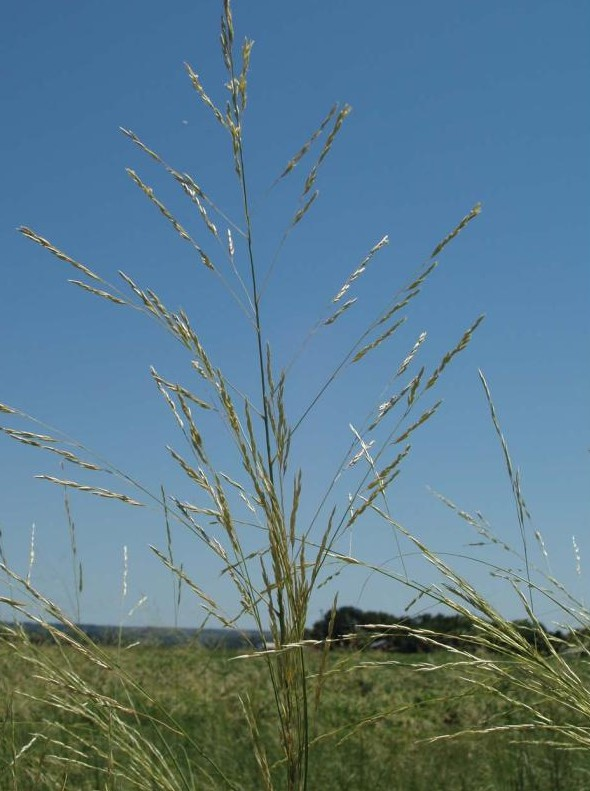

Conservation status
- Secure (NatureServe)

Scientific classification
- Kingdom: Plantae
- Clade: Tracheophytes
- Clade: Angiosperms
- Clade: Monocots
- Clade: Commelinids
- Order: Poales
- Family: Poaceae
- Genus: Calamovilfa
- Species: C. gigantea

Binomial name
- Calamovilfa gigantea (Nutt.) Scribn. & Merr.

= Calamovilfa gigantea =

Species of grass

Calamovilfa gigantea is a species of grass known by the common name giant sandreed. It is native to the Rocky Mountains and Great Plains of the United States.

== Description ==
This perennial grass has a long rhizome coated with scalelike leaves. The stems can reach 2.5 meters tall. The leaf blades may reach 90 centimeters in length. The inflorescence is a panicle up to 80 centimeters long by 60 wide, with spreading branches.

This grass grows in sandy areas, including blowouts. It can be used to reduce erosion on sandy substrates, as it creates colonies of plants. It can be used for forage for animals and it can be made into hay.

The Hopi used this plant to make various articles, such as bows and arrows and prayer sticks and to decorate kachinas.
