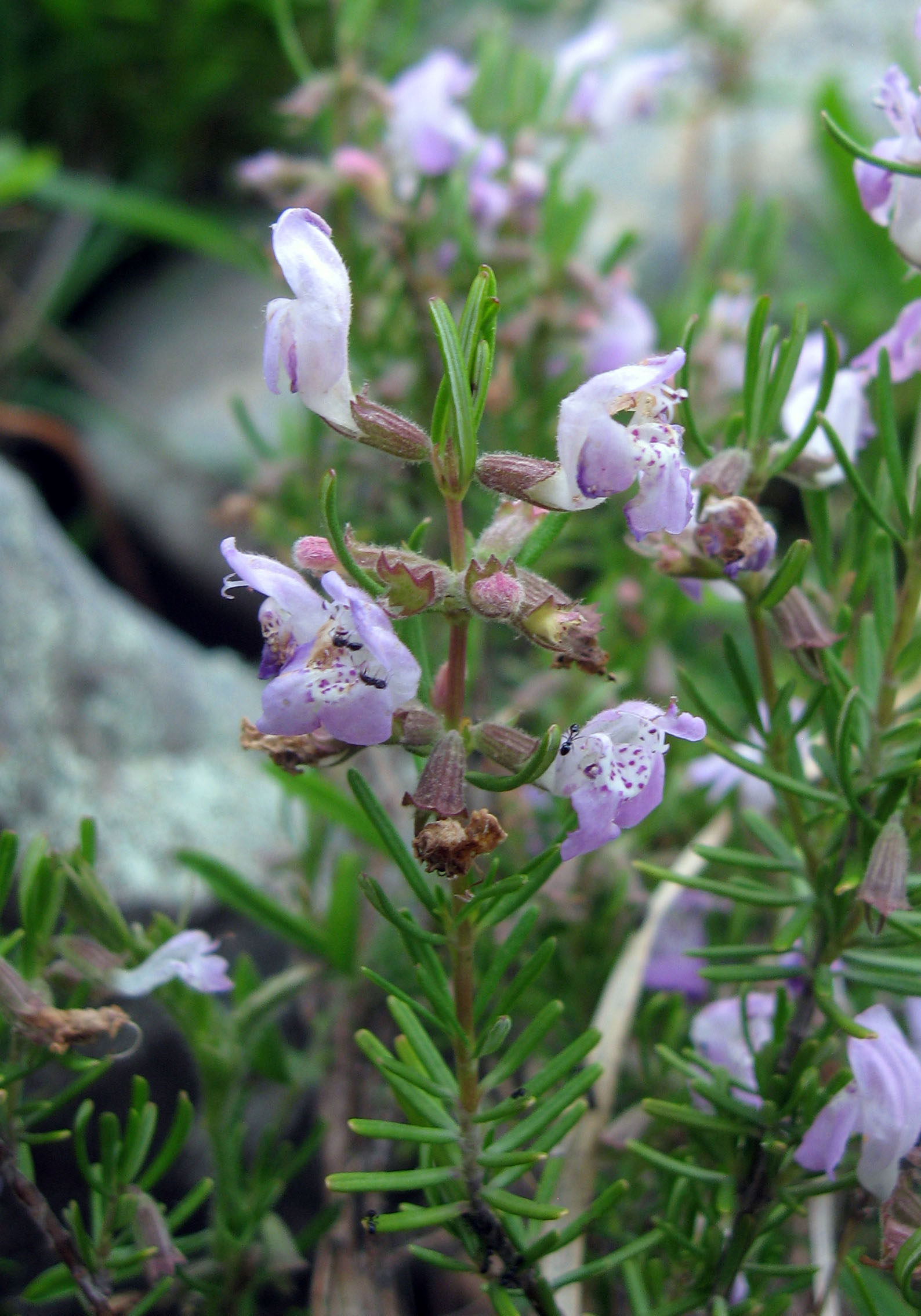
- Wild specimen on the Big South Fork of the Cumberland River

Conservation status
- Vulnerable (NatureServe)

- Threatened (ESA)

Scientific classification
- Kingdom: Plantae
- Clade: Embryophytes
- Clade: Tracheophytes
- Clade: Spermatophytes
- Clade: Angiosperms
- Clade: Eudicots
- Clade: Asterids
- Order: Lamiales
- Family: Lamiaceae
- Genus: Conradina
- Species: C. verticillata

Binomial name
- Conradina verticillata Jennison

= Conradina verticillata =

Species of flowering plant

Conradina verticillata is a flowering shrub in the mint family, found in the Cumberland Plateau. It is also called Conradina montana, Cumberland rosemary or Cumberland false rosemary. It has been classified as a threatened species under the Endangered Species Act since 1991.

== Physical characteristics ==
Cumberland rosemary is a shrub which grows about 50 cm high. It has needle-like leaves with an aromatic scent that resembles rosemary. Its flowers are lavender, purple, and more rarely, white. They are 1–2 cm long, with darker spots in the center. In profile, the flowers may have an “S” shape due to the curving of the floral cup. Cumberland rosemary has a bilabiate calyx, 7–9 mm long, with a glandular-hairy surface.

It may be hard to distinguish individual Cumberland rosemary plants by eye. What looks like separate plants can actually be one sprawling plant. This is because Cumberland rosemary's stems fall over when they grow higher than 30 cm. These horizontal branches will root at the nodes and grow new (vertical) stems. Because the plant lives in a gravelly environment with periodic flooding, sand and rocks can cover up these horizontal connections.

When it is not flowering, Cumberland rosemary may resemble other plants with needlelike leaves such as Aster linariifolius, Hypericum densiflorum, and Pycnanthemum tenuifolium. However, none of these other plants have a rosemary aroma.

== Life history and reproduction ==
Cumberland rosemary flowers from the middle of May to early June. The flower initially produces pollen for up to a day before the female parts become receptive. It is mainly pollinated by bumblebees and honeybees. Unpollinated flowers will last for a week. Pollinated flowers will fall off in two days.

Seeds mature in the middle of June. They are dark brown and 1 mm in diameter. Various studies report low seed viability. Roulston (1994) found that less than 10% of seeds germinate. A later study by Albrecht and Penago (2012) reported a higher percentage of 26%. The poor seed development may be attributed to the Cumberland rosemary's clonal nature. Pollinating insects transport pollen between nearby flowers, which are actually the same genetic individual. However, even with outcrossing, seed viability remains low.

The germination process takes two weeks, and it more likely to happen in warmer temperatures.

Cumberland rosemary is the only triploid species in the Conradina genus.

== Habitat ==
Cumberland rosemary lives on the rocky river banks of the Cumberland Plateau. It grows best in full sunlight and in well-drained soil with no visible organic matter. The soil may be mostly sand, or sand mixed with gravel. Thus, it also benefits from topographic features which enhance sand deposition. It relies on periodic flooding to eliminate taller plants which might leave Cumberland rosemary in the shade. Extended flooding may induce rooting at the lower stem nodes and disperse seeds and viable plant fragments downstream. It has been hypothesized Cumberland rosemary may thrive with alternating floods and extreme droughts, as this regime helps eliminate competition, but data is lacking on this.

The U.S. Fish and Wildlife Service did not designate a critical habitat for Cumberland rosemary at the time of its federal listing. The plant's locations are isolated and visitors are unlikely to stumble upon them. Announcing a critical habitat might attract collectors, or curious locals who might unknowingly cause damage. FWS stated that they would contact private landowners who have colonies of Cumberland rosemary growing on their property.

== Range and population ==
Cumberland rosemary is only found in the Cumberland Plateau in Tennessee and Kentucky. At the time of its federal listing in 1991, there were three populations in Tennessee: one along the South Fork Cumberland River, one along the Caney Fork River, and one along the Obed River system. In total, there were 44 known colonies. The population in Kentucky is also along the South Fork Cumberland River, and had four colonies.

In 1996, it was reported that there were 79 colonies in Tennessee and 12 in Kentucky. In 2010, observers were able to count a total of 60 colonies. In 2017, number of colonies was 66.

== History of ESA listing ==
Cumberland rosemary was first collected by Albert Ruth in 1894. In 1933, H.M. Jennison named the plant Conradina verticillata. 7 months later, J.K. Small named the plant Conradina montana.

The Endangered Species Act was signed in 1973. In 1975, The Smithsonian Institution included Cumberland Rosemary in a review of threatened, endangered, or extinct plant species. FWS funded a survey of the plant in Tennessee and Kentucky from 1979 to 1981, and declared Cumberland rosemary as a category 1 species, meaning that the agency has enough information to classify it as endangered or threatened. (This category is now outdated, and the United States Fish and Wildlife Service|U.S. Fish and Wildlife Service uses “candidate species” instead.) The U.S. Fish and Wildlife Service officially proposed Cumberland rosemary as “threatened” in January 1991. It was federally listed in November 1991, which took effect on December 30, 1991. A recovery plan was published in 1996.

In Tennessee, the plant was listed as endangered in 1985. It does not have legal protection in Kentucky.

== Major threats ==
The biggest threat faced by Cumberland rosemary is habitat degradation affecting the rivers. For instance, the construction of Wolf Creek Dam in Kentucky extirpated one population. Dams can impact Cumberland rosemary in two ways: either by permanently flooding its habitat, or by altering the natural flood regime. Without flooding, the plant is unable to compete with taller plants for sunlight. Also, nearby coal mining can affect the water quality by making it more acidic.

Cumberland rosemary can be found in the Big South Fork National River and Recreation Area, a popular site for camping, hiking, and white water-rafting. Visitors may unknowingly damage the plant, especially with off-road vehicles.

In recent years, invasive exotic species such as tree-of-heaven and mimosa have threatened the population in the Big South Fork National River and Recreation Area. The National Park Service designated various sites—some of which overlap with the Cumberland rosemary population—to control these invasive species. While the specific impact of these invasive species on Cumberland rosemary is unknown, it is likely that they leave Cumberland rosemary in the shade and hinder its growth.

Cumberland rosemary is also considered moderately vulnerable to the effects of climate change.

== Conservation efforts ==
According to the 1996 recovery plan, Cumberland rosemary will be considered for delisting when there are five protected colonies on five rivers for a total of 25 colonies. Each colony must have 50 genetically distinct individuals. The five rivers are: Big South Fork Cumberland River, Caney Fork River, and Obed River, along with its tributaries, Clear Creek and Daddy's Creek. The recovery plan predicted a completion date of 2005, but as of 2018 Cumberland Rosemary is still considered threatened.

In 1993, Cumberland rosemary was being propagated ex situ at the North Carolina Arboretum and some other nurseries in the southeastern US. As of 2018, NCA only has seeds in storage.

Although much of Cumberland rosemary's population is found on National Park Service land, there have not been changes made to the trails on BSFNRRA to guide visitors away from the plant. But there is also unclear data on the severity of human impact; most of it is anecdotal.
