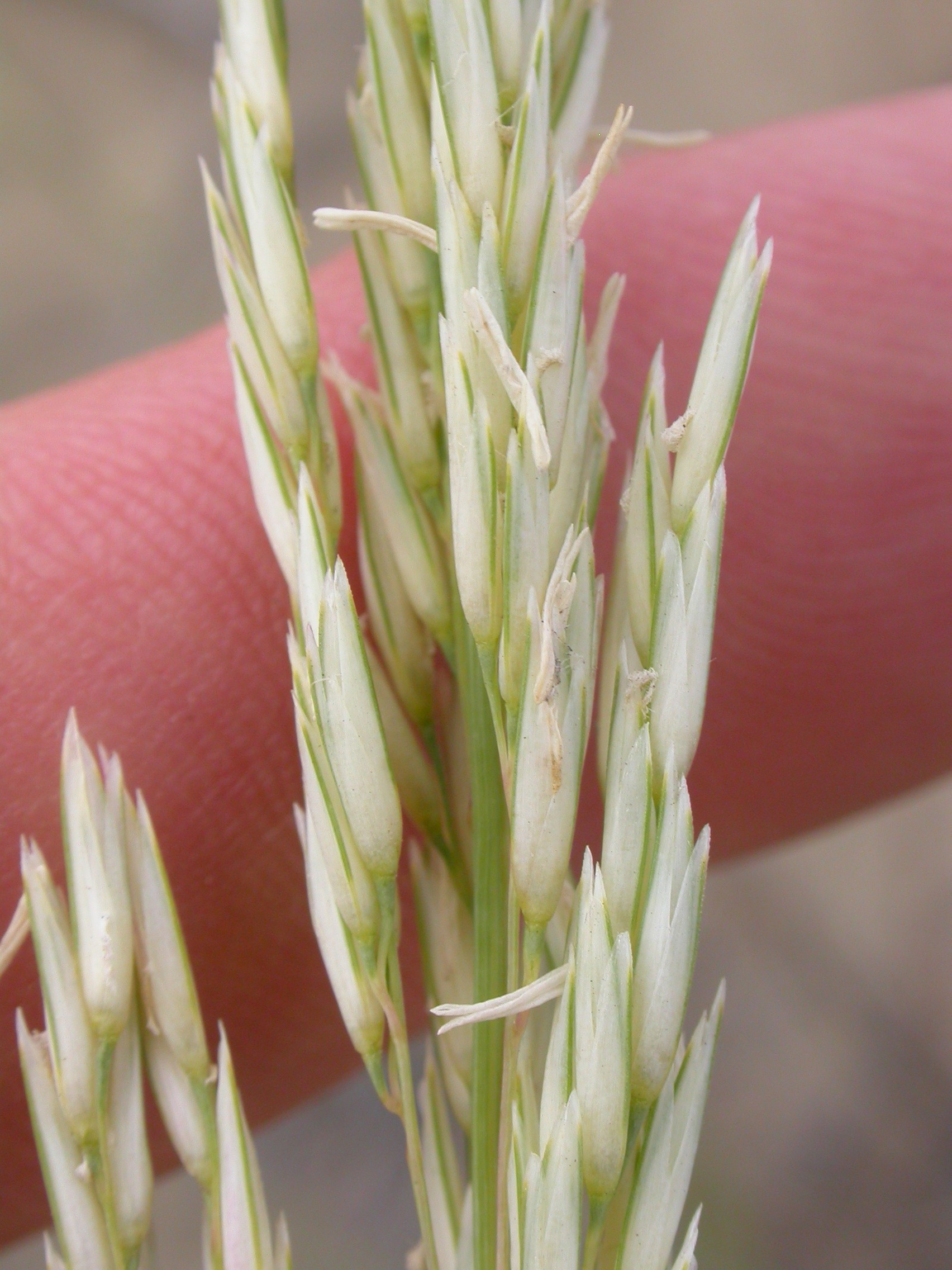

Conservation status
- Secure (NatureServe)

Scientific classification
- Kingdom: Plantae
- Clade: Embryophytes
- Clade: Tracheophytes
- Clade: Spermatophytes
- Clade: Angiosperms
- Clade: Monocots
- Clade: Commelinids
- Order: Poales
- Family: Poaceae
- Genus: Calamovilfa
- Species: C. longifolia

Binomial name
- Calamovilfa longifolia (Hook.) Scribn.

= Calamovilfa longifolia =

Species of grass

Calamovilfa longifolia is a species of warm-season grass known by the common names prairie sandreed and sand reedgrass. It is native to North America, where it occurs from the Northwest Territories to Ontario in Canada and as far south as New Mexico and Kansas in the United States. There are two varieties, var. longifolia being widespread in the species' range and var. magna being native to the Great Lakes region.

This species is a perennial grass with long, leafy rhizomes which hold the soil, forming sod. The roots may reach 3 metres (9.8 feet) deep in the soil. The stems are up to 2.4 m (7.9 ft) tall and can form colonies up to 8 m (26 ft) in diameter. Each stem has up to 12 leaves up to 76 centimetres (2.49 feet) long by 1 cm (0.39 in) wide. The leaves tend to roll up during dry conditions. The inflorescence is a panicle up to 78 cm (31 in) long. The spikelet is pale and shiny. The fruit is a caryopsis a few millimeters in length which has a ring of long hairs around its base. These help the seeds disperse on the wind. The plant may reproduce sexually via seed, but most of its reproduction is vegetative as the plant sprouts from the starchy tips of its rhizomes. Plants growing in moist, disturbed habitat and recently burned areas are most likely to produce seeds.

This grass occurs in several types of habitat, including many types of grassland and prairie, pine and hardwood forest, sagebrush, and pinyon-juniper woodland, and dunes such as those on the margins of the Great Lakes. The plant grows in climates featuring hot summers, cold winters, and moderate precipitation. It is a dominant grass species in many regions, including the Nebraska Sand Hills and other sand hills, the Red River Valley, many prairies and grasslands of the Great Plains, and certain beaches along the Great Lakes, such as those at Kohler-Andrae State Park and Point Beach State Forest in Wisconsin.

Though it is not one of the most palatable or nutritious grasses, this species is an important forage for livestock in sand hills regions. It begins growth earlier in the season than many other grasses. Some species of wildlife utilize it for food, such as California quail and pocket gophers. Waterfowl and black-tailed prairie dogs use it for cover.

This grass is useful for stabilizing soil and preventing erosion because its robust rhizome easily holds loose, sandy soils. It can be used in revegetation efforts in disturbed habitat with sandy substrates, such as blowouts. A number of cultivars have been developed, including 'Goshen' and 'Pronghorn'. Pests of the grass include grasshoppers and the rust fungus Puccinia amphigena.
