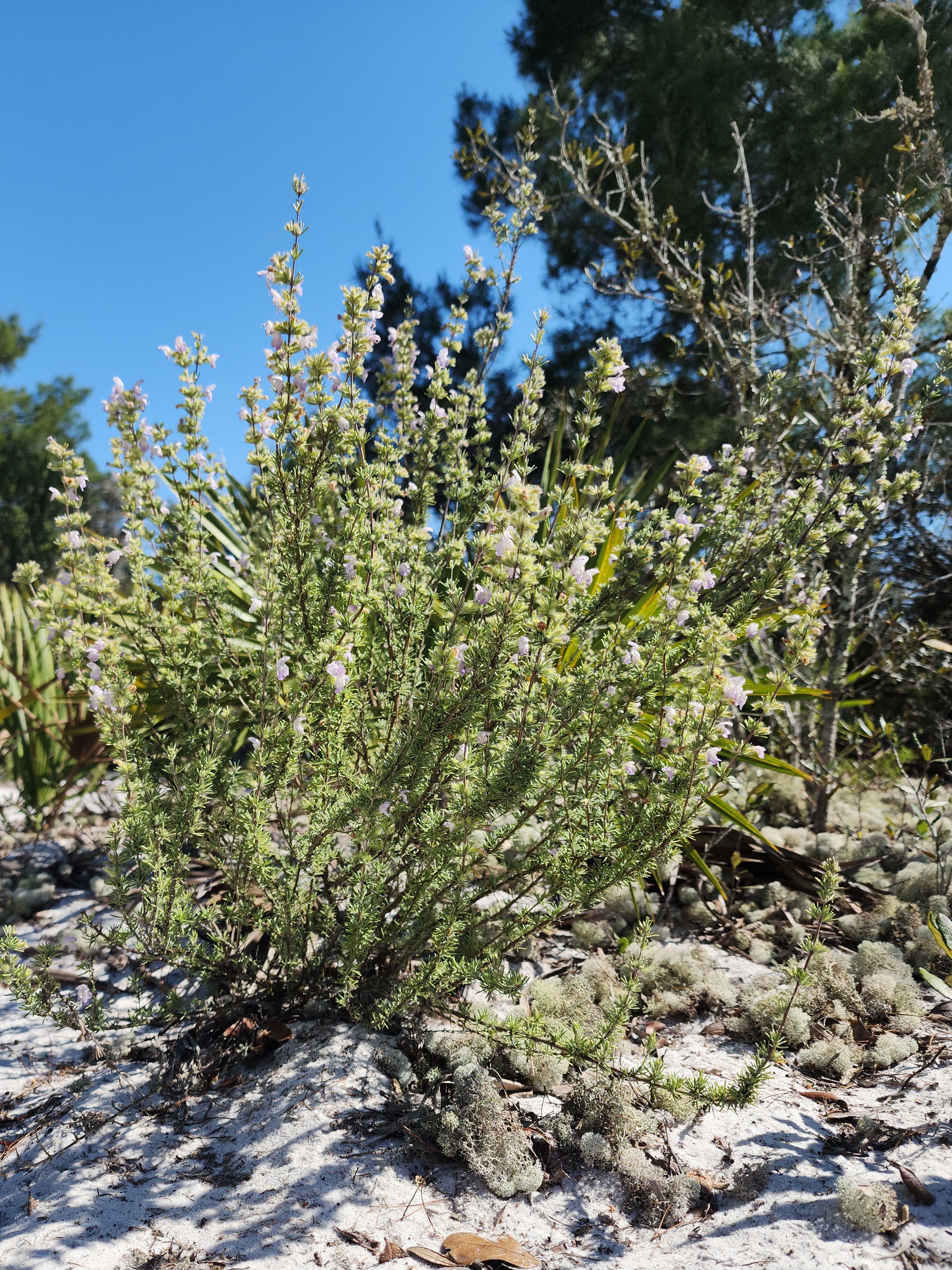
- Growing in scrubby flatwood habitat, Highlands County, Florida

Conservation status
- Imperiled (NatureServe)

- Endangered (ESA)

Scientific classification
- Kingdom: Plantae
- Clade: Tracheophytes
- Clade: Angiosperms
- Clade: Eudicots
- Clade: Asterids
- Order: Lamiales
- Family: Lamiaceae
- Genus: Conradina
- Species: C. brevifolia

Binomial name
- Conradina brevifolia Shinners 1962

= Conradina brevifolia =

Species of flowering plant

Conradina brevifolia is a rare species of shrub in the mint family known by the common name short-leaved false rosemary. It is endemic to Central Florida, where it is known only from the Lake Wales Ridge. There are perhaps 36 occurrences of the plant remaining, and 10 of these are likely to be destroyed as their habitat is fragmented in the coming years. About 15% of the Lake Wales Ridge, the only home territory of the plant, remains today, the rest having been cleared for development and citrus groves. Few of the extant populations have more than 25 plants. This is a federally listed endangered species of the United States.

== Characteristics ==
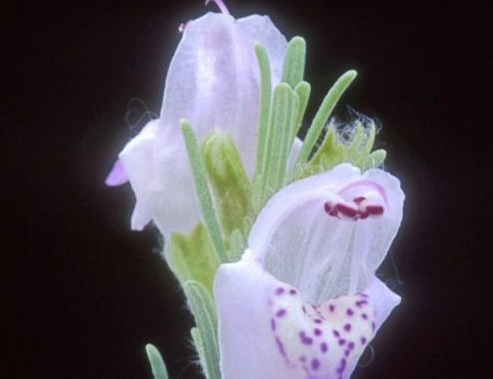
Close-up of flower

It is an aromatic shrub growing up to about a meter tall. The small, fleshy, glandular leaves are linear in shape and under a centimeter long. Lavender flowers occur in the leaf axils. This species was once included in Conradina canescens, but the two are now treated as separate species.

== Habitat ==
This plant grows in Florida scrub habitat on white sand substrates among sand pines and oaks.

== Endangered status ==
This shrub is long-lived. Though its populations are quite fragmented today, many of the individuals still living grew up before the habitat was fragmented, and so have mixed their genes with other populations, making the species more genetically diverse. Such gene flow is less likely today because the populations are more separated. Other threats include collection by plant enthusiasts, mowing, off-road vehicles, and fire suppression. Like many smaller Florida scrub plant species, this shrub is adapted to periodic wildfire which clears overgrown brush and tall woody vegetation so that the understory plants receive sunlight. Fires are prevented and extinguished today to prevent property damage. Land management plans for the species include controlled burns.

Some populations occur in Lake Arbuckle State Forest, where they are protected. Most populations are not protected, however, including many that grow on private property.

Little is known about the life history of this plant, including its ecology; more research is needed.
