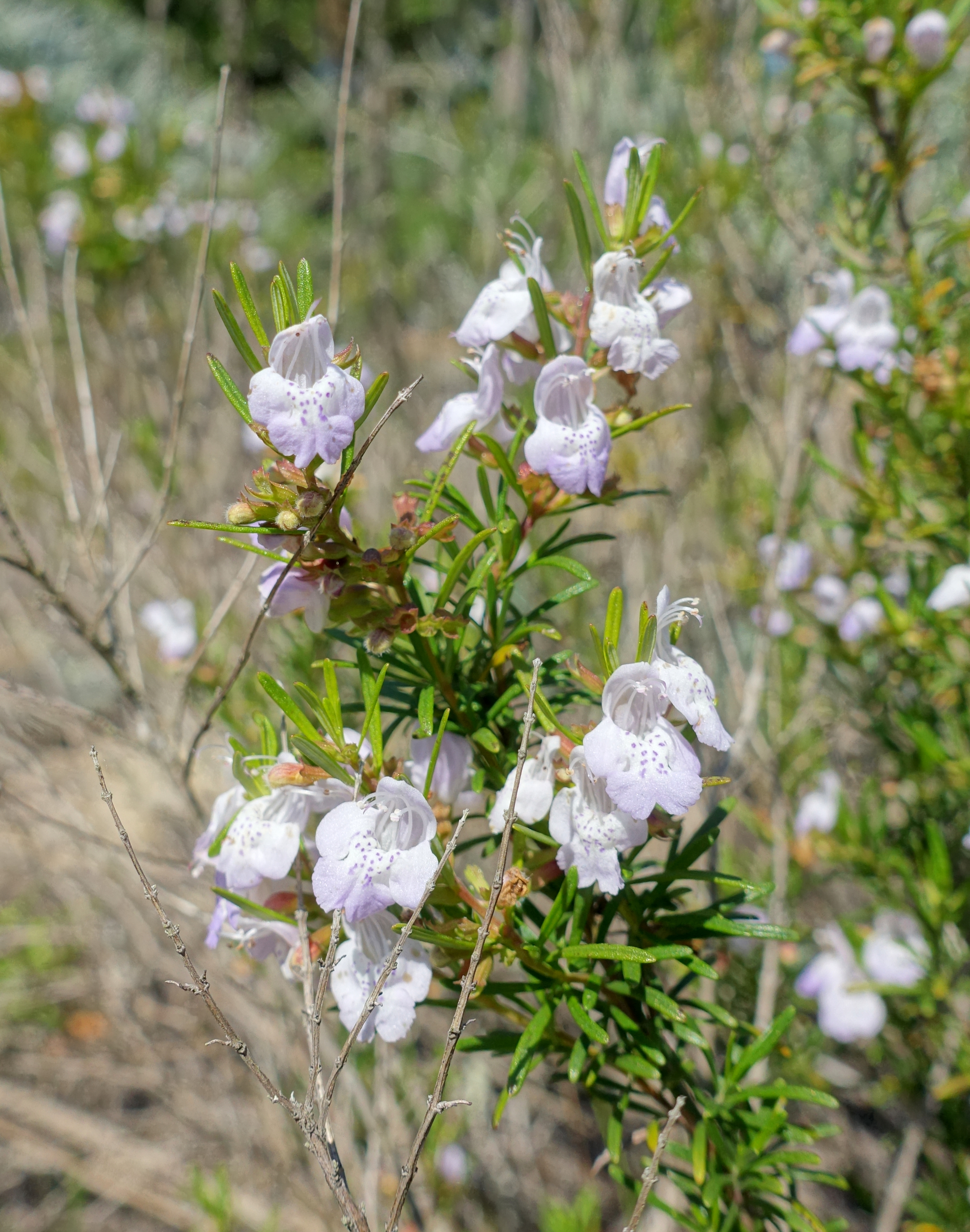

Conservation status
- Critically Imperiled (NatureServe)

- Endangered (ESA)

Scientific classification
- Kingdom: Plantae
- Clade: Tracheophytes
- Clade: Angiosperms
- Clade: Eudicots
- Clade: Asterids
- Order: Lamiales
- Family: Lamiaceae
- Genus: Conradina
- Species: C. glabra

Binomial name
- Conradina glabra Shinners

= Conradina glabra =

Species of flowering plant

Conradina glabra is a rare species of shrub known by the common names Apalachicola rosemary or Apalachicola false rosemary. It is endemic to Liberty County, Florida, where it is known from about ten populations. It is found only in a small area and it is threatened by habitat destruction. It is a federally listed endangered species.

== Habitat ==
This plant is limited to the sandhills and forest habitat of northern Liberty County in the Florida Panhandle, where it grows among oaks and longleaf pines (Pinus palustris). It had previously been reported from Santa Rosa County, as well, but these specimens proved to be Conradina canescens. Several of the remaining populations are within the bounds of Torreya State Park.

== Characteristics ==
This is an aromatic shrub growing to a maximum height of 80 centimeters to one meter. The branches are lined with linear, needlelike, mint-scented leaves up to 1.5 centimeters long. The inflorescence is two or three flowers borne in the leaf axils, each flower between 1 and 2 centimeters in length. The double-lipped flower is pale lavender in color with darker purple spotting on the lower lip. The plant reproduces sexually by seed and vegetatively by sprouting from its base.

== Endangered status ==
This species is mainly threatened by the loss and degradation of its habitat. The land on which it grows has been drastically altered by the conversion of land to agriculture, particularly silviculture. Starting in the 1950s large strips of the native pine forests in the area were removed and replaced with plantations of slash pine (Pinus elliottii). The rare plant can sometimes be found on the margins of these plantations. It is not certain how abundant the shrub was before the habitat was altered because it was not even discovered until the silviculture operations had begun.
