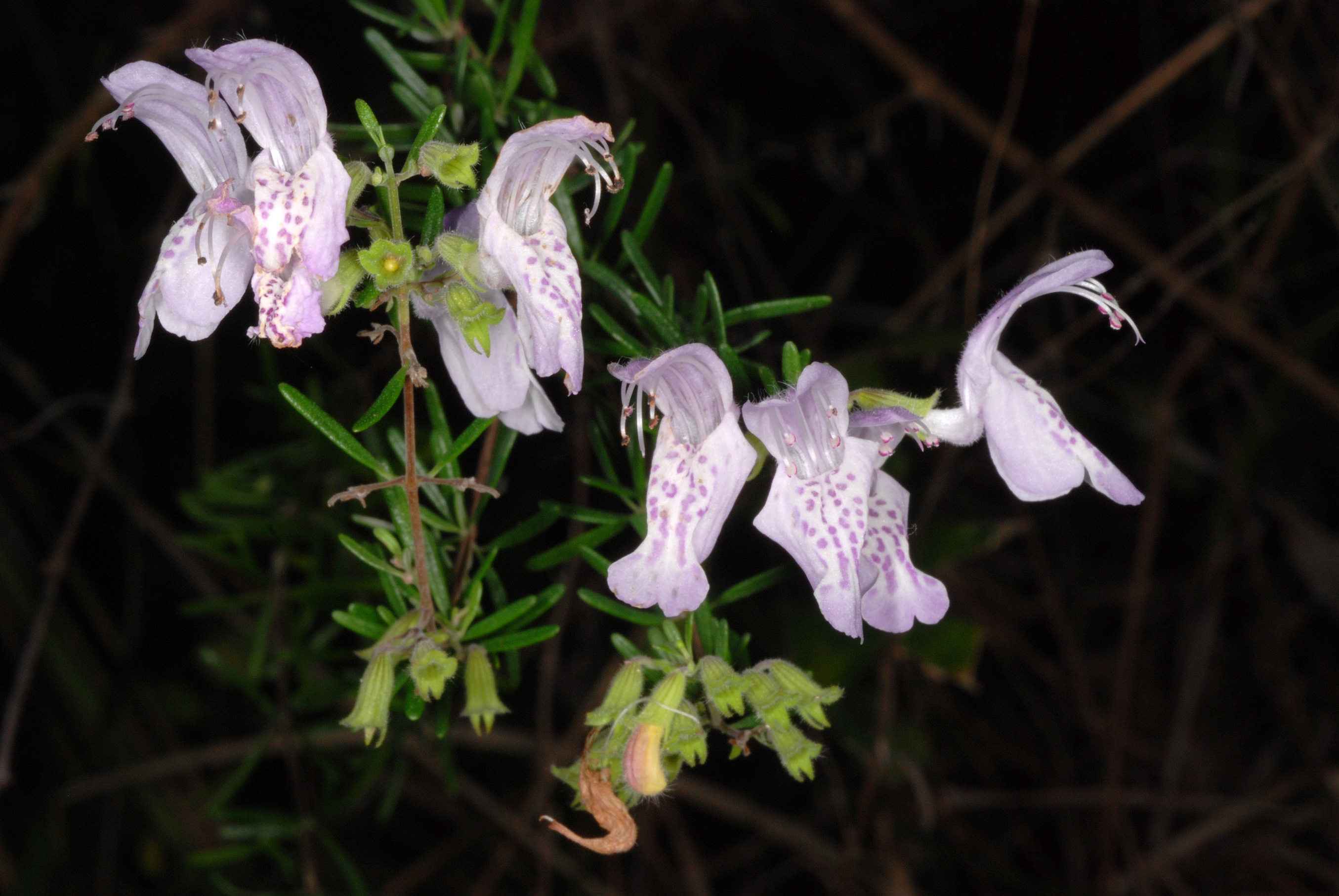

Conservation status
- Vulnerable (NatureServe)

Scientific classification
- Kingdom: Plantae
- Clade: Embryophytes
- Clade: Tracheophytes
- Clade: Angiosperms
- Clade: Eudicots
- Clade: Asterids
- Order: Lamiales
- Family: Lamiaceae
- Genus: Conradina
- Species: C. grandiflora

Binomial name
- Conradina grandiflora Small 1924

= Conradina grandiflora =

Species of flowering plant

Conradina grandiflora is a species of flowering plant in the mint family known by the common name largeflower false rosemary, or large-flowered rosemary. It is endemic to Florida in the United States, where it occurs on the Atlantic Coastal Ridge. Its distribution spans Brevard, Broward, Dade, Highlands, Indian River, Martin, Osceola, Palm Beach, Polk, St. Lucie, and Volusia Counties.

This aromatic shrub generally grows up to about 1.5 meters in maximum height, but it is known to reach two meters. The branches end in twigs which are coated in pale hairs. The hairy, glandular, needle-like leaves are up to 1.5 centimeters in length. Each flower has a hairy, maroon-tinged calyx of pointed sepals. The flower corolla is about 2 centimeters long, with a funnel-shaped throat and a hairy, lipped mouth. It is lavender in color with darker lavender spots. This species has the largest flowers of the genus Conradina. The plant flowers year-round.

This plant grows on dunes and other landforms with deep, sandy soils, often near the coast. The habitat is generally Florida scrub, and the plant is common in remaining remnants of scrub habitat. It is well-adapted to a regime of frequent fires. It does not tolerate shade and requires fire to keep the habitat open and sunny. It is associated with sand pine (Pinus clausa), and with Lyonia, Ilex, Ceratiola, Polygonella, Opuntia, and various scrub oaks. There are about 64 occurrences.

The main threat to the species is the loss of the Florida scrub habitat. It is being claimed for development of housing, commercial use, and citrus groves. It carries a threatened status in the state of Florida, but it is not federally listed.
