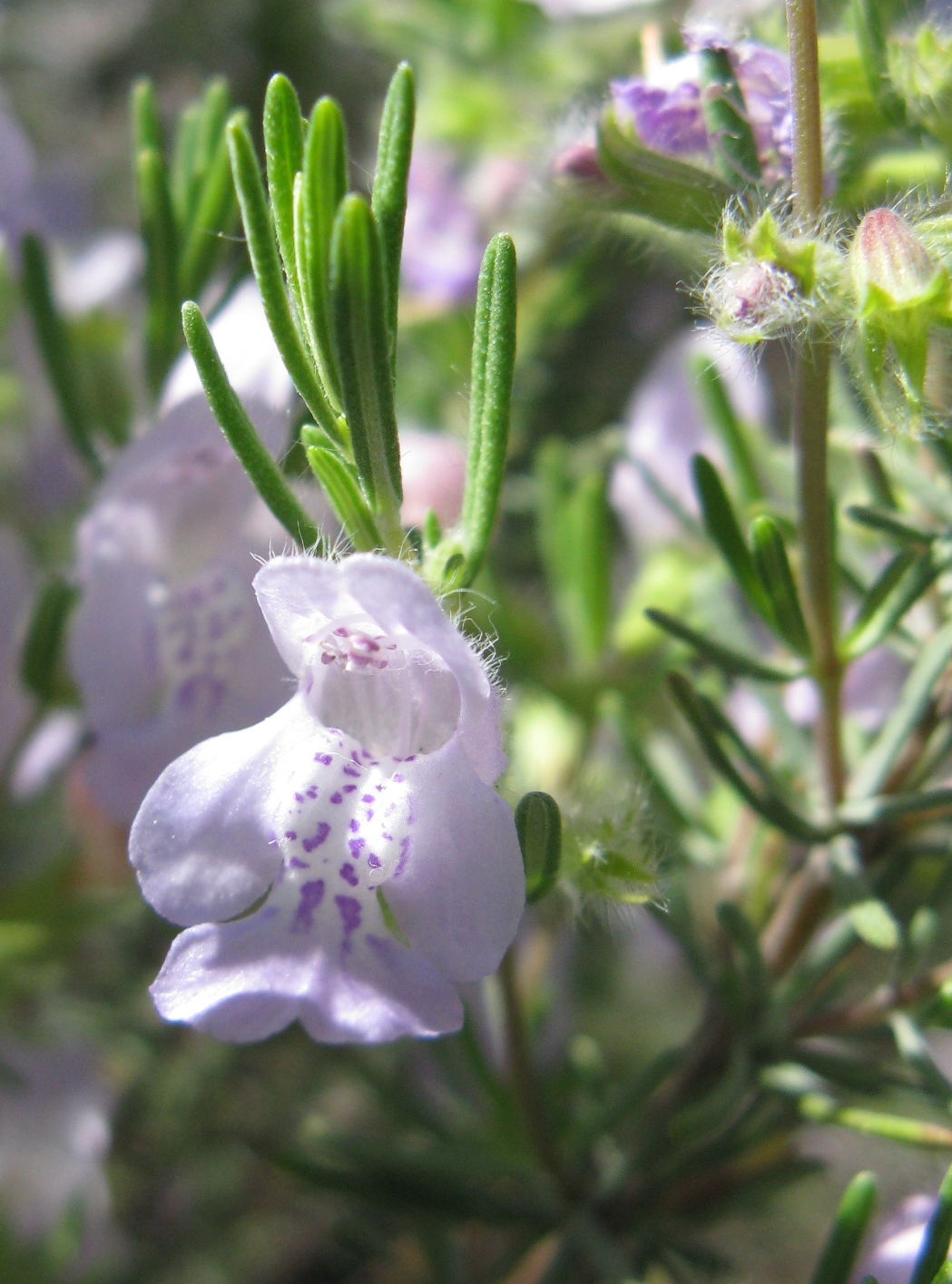
- False rosemary (Conradina canescens). Note hairs on flower calyxes.

Scientific classification
- Kingdom: Plantae
- Clade: Tracheophytes
- Clade: Angiosperms
- Clade: Eudicots
- Clade: Asterids
- Order: Lamiales
- Family: Lamiaceae
- Subfamily: Nepetoideae
- Tribe: Mentheae
- Genus: Conradina; Asa Gray

Type species
- Conradina canescens Asa Gray

= Conradina =

Genus of flowering plants

Conradina is a genus of flowering plants in the mint family, Lamiaceae. Its common name is false rosemary, or rarely, short leaf rosemary. There are 7 species of Conradina, all native to the southeastern United States.

Conradina verticillata grows on the Cumberland Plateau in Kentucky and Tennessee. The other five grow mainly in Florida. All of the species are closely related and there is some doubt about whether they are all separate. Most species occupy xeric habitats with well-drained soils composed of white sand. The genus Conradina was established by Asa Gray in 1870. It was named for American botanist Solomon White Conrad.

False rosemary is adapted to dunes and open, scrubby areas. It is a woody perennial shrub, often with masses of white to lavender blooms in the early spring or fall. These blooms attract several species of bees. Conradina often has a scrubby appearance; however some plants seem to have a denser habitus. Conradina is found growing in association with sand pines and oaks, and may be a pioneer species in disturbed areas. Terpenes released from false rosemary are allelopathic, and suppresses the growth of grasses. This is thought to help prevent wildfires. The plants are commonly up to 1 m (3.3 ft) in height.

False rosemary has been suggested as a landscaping plant for xeriscaping because it is drought tolerant and grows well with little water, even in poor soils.

False rosemary has flowers and scent similar to those of Rosmarinus officinalis.

Until recently, limited scientific study had been published on culinary, medicinal or other properties of Conradina, but it has been shown to be a potential source for numerous essential oils and other compounds.

Apart from Conradina verticillata, which is a triploid, all of the species of Conradina are diploid and have a haploid chromosome number of 12. Conradina has been the subject of genetic research.

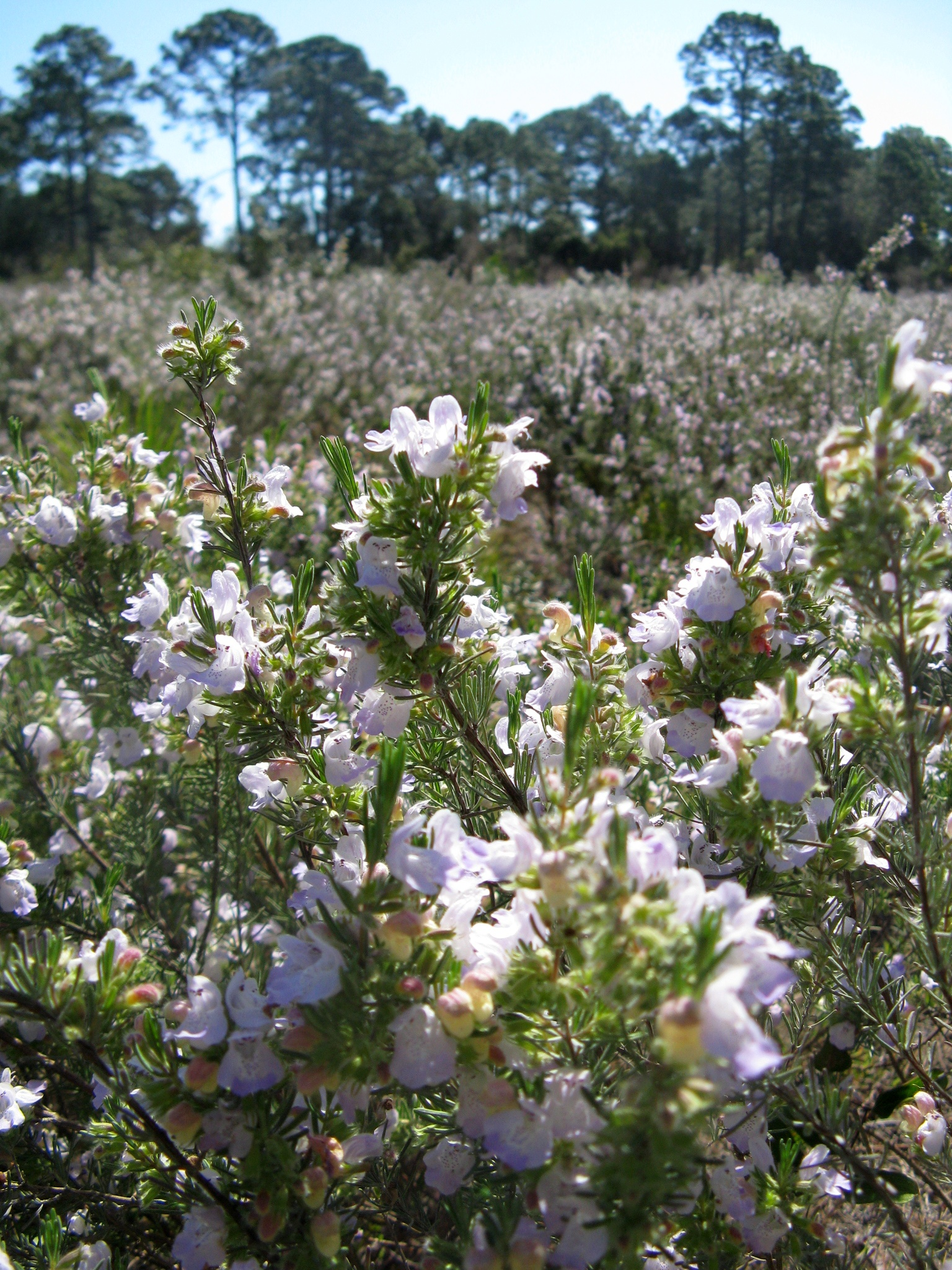
Field of false rosemary

== Species ==
Image	Scientific name	Common name	Distribution
	Conradina brevifolia	Shortleaf false rosemary	This species grows in Polk and Highlands counties on the Lake Wales Ridge in Central peninsular Florida. It is listed as a federally endangered species.
	Conradina canescens	False rosemary	This species is found along the gulf coast of Mississippi, Alabama and Florida, as well as in the sand hills of central Florida. It is the most common and widespread species in the genus.
	Conradina cygniflora		Described in 2009, known only from Putnam County, Florida.
	Conradina etonia	Etonia rosemary	Verified in only Putnam County, Florida. A federally endangered species.
	Conradina glabra	Apalacicola false rosemary	Found only in Liberty county, Florida. Listed as a federally endangered species.
	Conradina grandiflora	Largeflower false rosemary	This species grows in counties along the Atlantic coast of Florida. It is listed as a threatened species in the state of Florida.
	Conradina verticillata	Cumberland false rosemary	Listed as federally threatened, this species occupies the sandy soil of cobble bars along rivers of the Cumberland Plateau in Kentucky and Tennessee.

== Affinities ==
Conradina is one of the southeastern scrub mints. This group consists of Dicerandra, Stachydeoma, Piloblephis, Conradina, and four species of the polyphyletic genus Clinopodium that will eventually be transferred out of that genus. All are shrubs except Dicerandra. They are indigenous to the southeastern United States. Conradina is distinguished from the others by a sharply bent corolla tube.

== Sources ==
- (1) FNAI. 2000. Field Guide to the Rare Plants and Animals of Florida online. Florida Natural Areas Inventory.
- (2) Godfrey, R. K. 1988. Trees, shrubs, and woody vines of northern Florida and adjacent Georgia and Alabama. Athens, GA: University of Georgia Press.
