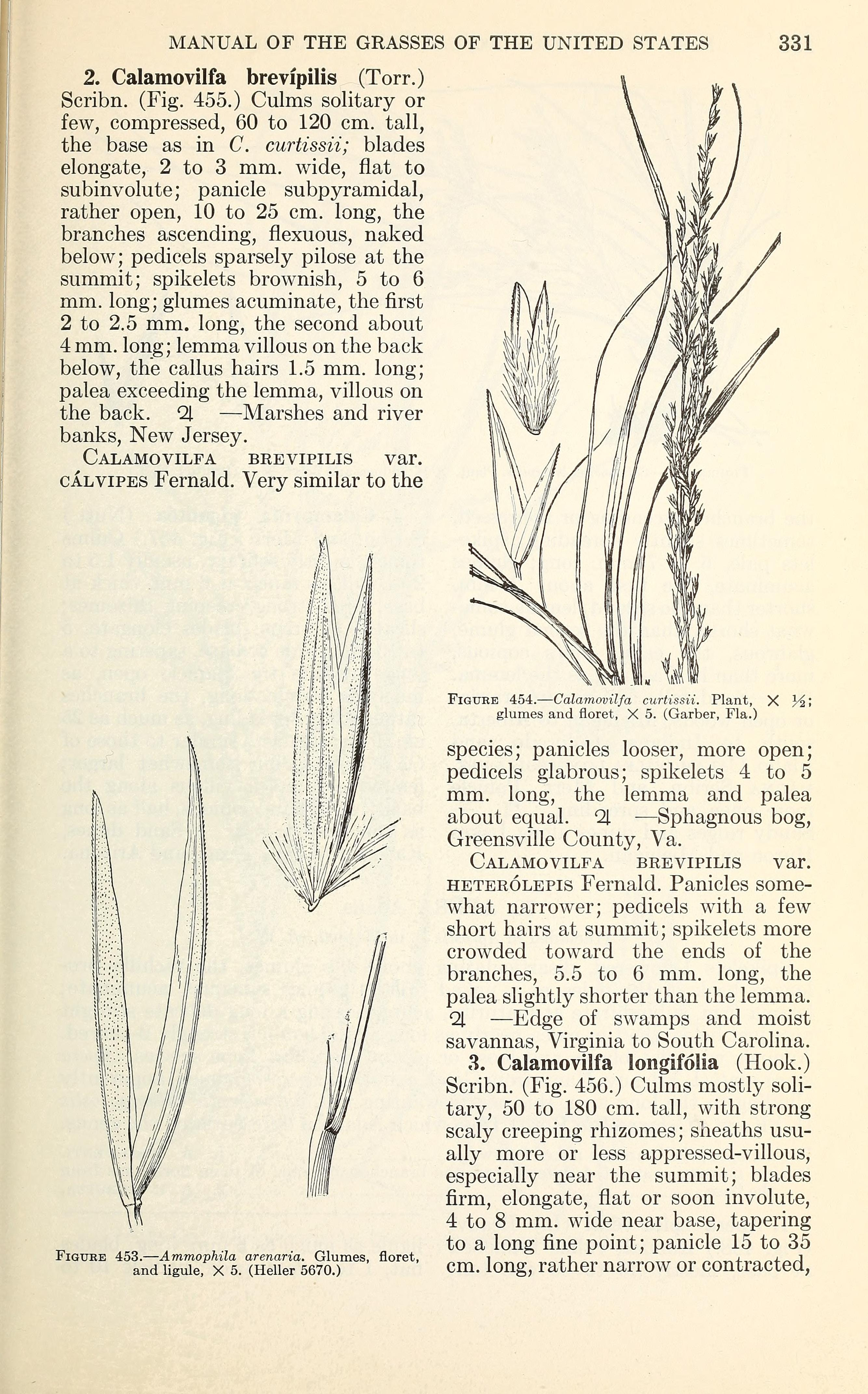
- Calamovilfa curtissi (former name) in upper right

Conservation status
- Apparently Secure (NatureServe)

Scientific classification
- Kingdom: Plantae
- Clade: Embryophytes
- Clade: Tracheophytes
- Clade: Spermatophytes
- Clade: Angiosperms
- Clade: Monocots
- Clade: Commelinids
- Order: Poales
- Family: Poaceae
- Subfamily: Chloridoideae
- Genus: Sporobolus
- Species: S. vaseyi

Binomial name
- Sporobolus vaseyi P.M.Peterson

Synonyms
- Ammophila curtissii Vasey; Calamagrostis curtissii (Vasey) Vasey; Calamovilfa curtissii (Vasey) Scribn.

= Sporobolus vaseyi =

Species of flowering plant

Sporobolus vaseyi, also known as Florida sandreed, is a species of perennial plant endemic to Florida.

Frank Lamson Scribner published an image and description of it in 1899.
