= Solomon W. Conrad =

American mineralogist and botanist

Solomon White Conrad (1779-1831) was an American printer, bookseller, and approved Quaker minister who became a professor of mineralogy and a botanist. The genus Conradina is named for him.

Born in Montgomery County, Pennsylvania, his father was a blacksmith. Solomon W. Conrad was in the printing businesses in Philadelphia. He was an avid collector of specimens and artifacts along the Schuylkill River.

He lectured at the University of Pennsylvania on mineralogy and became a professor of botany at the school in 1829.

Conrad was a member of the Philadelphia Academy of Natural Sciences (serving as its librarian from the end of 1826 until the end of 1828) and Philadelphia Society for Promoting Agriculture. He published periodicals and books on plants.

He published a proposal on "Church Governmen".

Paleontologist Timothy Abbott Conrad (1803 – 1877) was his son.

He had an office at 87 High Street in Philadelphia. He printed an account of two early abolitionists, Benjamin Lay and Ralph Sandiford by Roberts Vaux.

He published a book on home medicine. He published a Guide to True Happiness by Samuel Coate in 1804.
