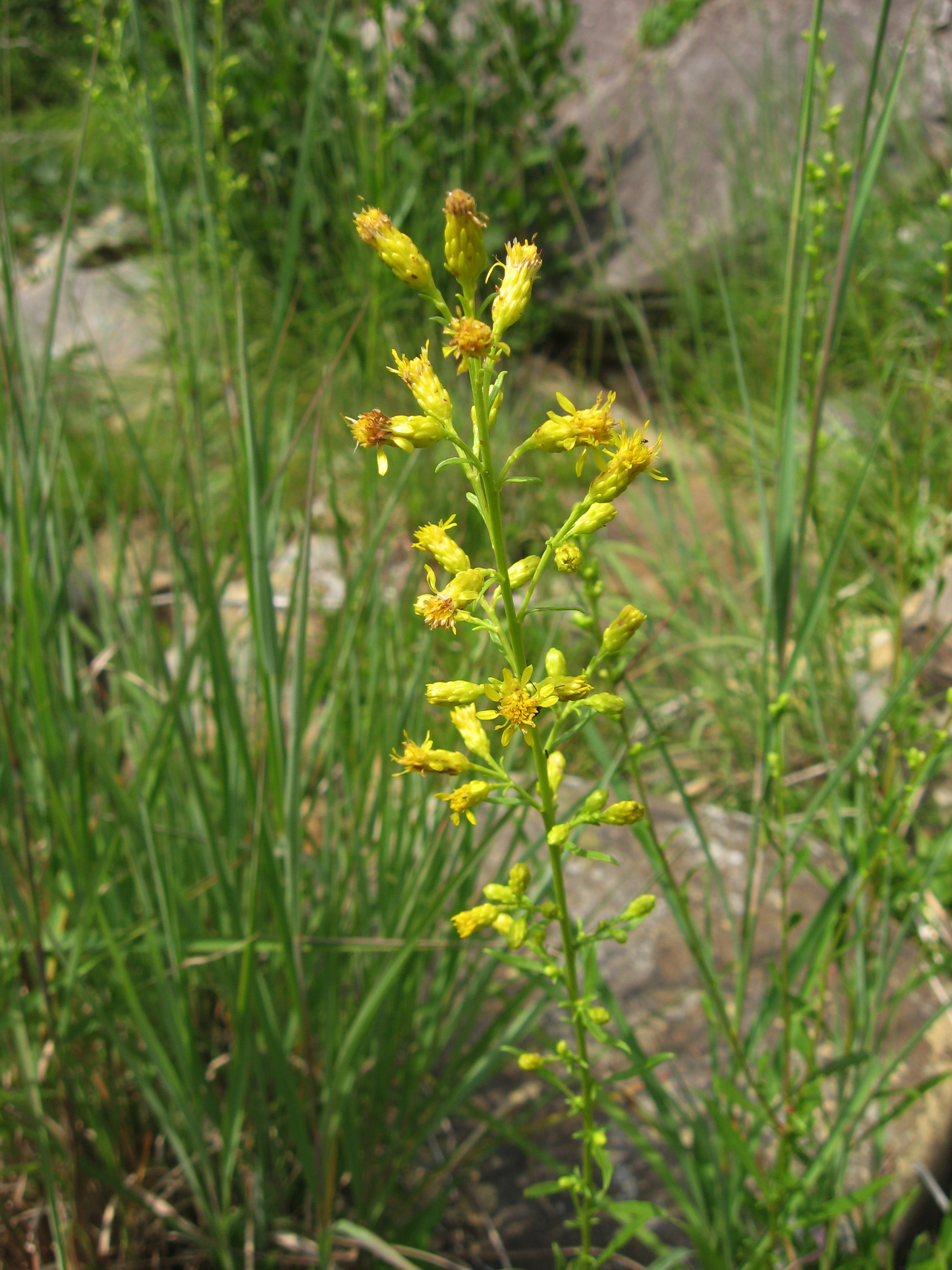

Conservation status
- Imperiled (NatureServe)

Scientific classification
- Kingdom: Plantae
- Clade: Tracheophytes
- Clade: Angiosperms
- Clade: Eudicots
- Clade: Asterids
- Order: Asterales
- Family: Asteraceae
- Genus: Solidago
- Species: S. arenicola

Binomial name
- Solidago arenicola B.R. Keener & Kral

= Solidago arenicola =

Species of flowering plant

Solidago arenicola, also referred to as Locust Fork goldenrod, is a rare species of flowering plant in the family Asteraceae (after the type locality, which is alongside the Locust Fork River in Blount County, Alabama). It has been found only in the states of Tennessee and Alabama in the United States. It is endemic to riverside scour areas on the Cumberland Plateau, where it is often locally abundant.

Solidago arenicola is a perennial herb reaching as tall as 80 cm (32 inches), with a woody underground rhizome. Leaves extend up to 15 cm (8 inches) and are mainly situated on the lower portion of the stem. A single plant may bear as many as 50 yellow flower heads on the upper branches.
