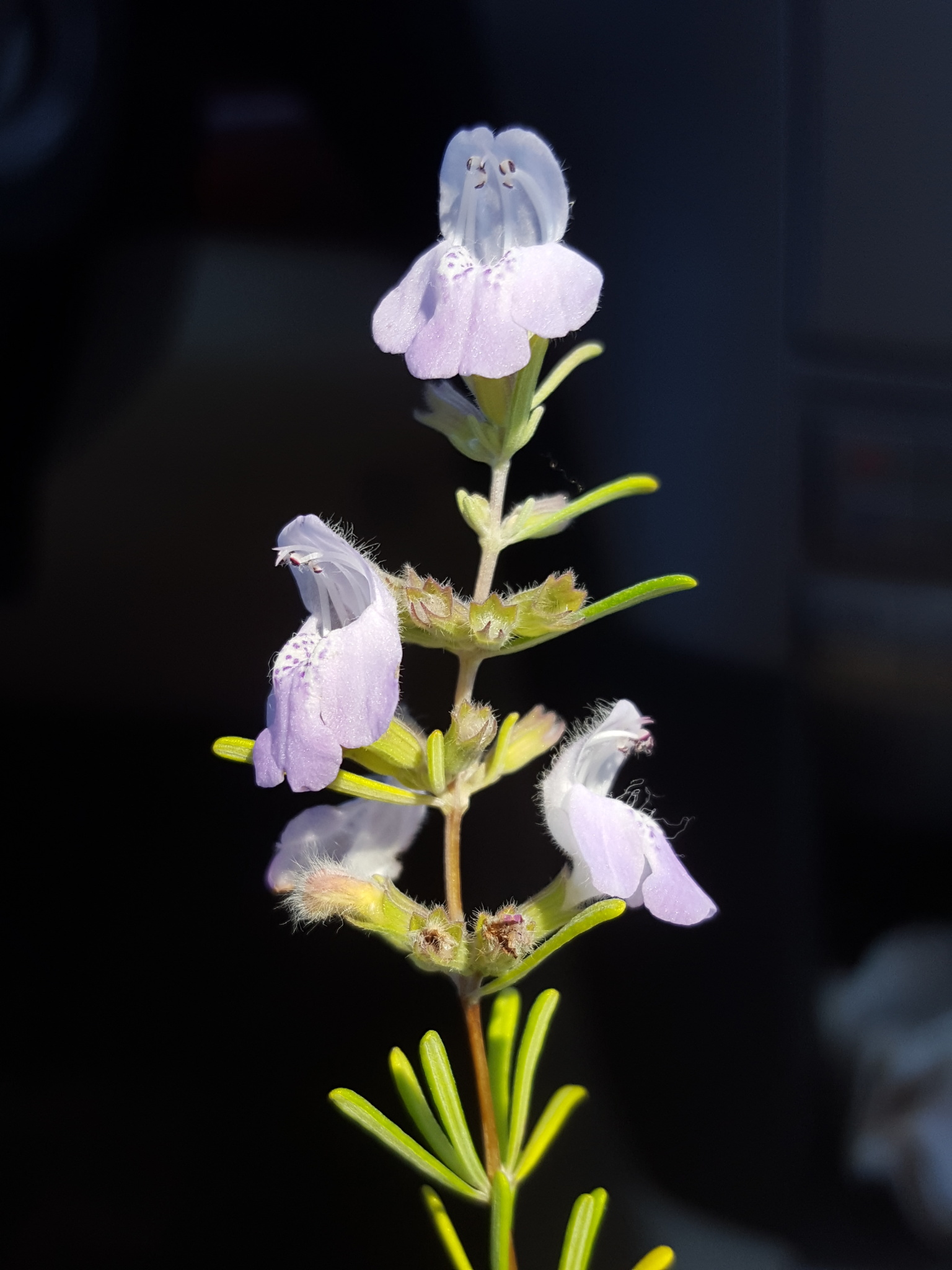

Scientific classification
- Kingdom: Plantae
- Clade: Tracheophytes
- Clade: Angiosperms
- Clade: Eudicots
- Clade: Asterids
- Order: Lamiales
- Family: Lamiaceae
- Genus: Conradina
- Species: C. canescens

Binomial name
- Conradina canescens A.Gray 1870

= Conradina canescens =

Species of flowering plant

Conradina canescens, commonly called false rosemary, is a shrub in the mint family. It is native to the southeastern United States, where it is restricted to coastal areas of Alabama, Florida, and Mississippi. Its natural habitat is sandhills, coastal scrub, and flatwoods.

This species a shrub that produces light purple flowers. It is distinguished from other Conradina by its linear, revolute leaves that are densely gray-pubescent.
