= Frank Lamson-Scribner =

American botanist (1851–1938)

- Lamson-Scribner c. 1921
- Born: April 19, 1851; Cambridgeport, MA
- Died: February 22, 1938 (aged 86); Washington, DC
- Other name: Franklin Pierce Lamson
- Citizenship: American
- Education: Maine
- Scientific career
- Fields: Botany
- Workplaces: USDA; University of Tennessee
- Author abbrev. (botany): Scribn.

Frank Lamson-Scribner (April 19, 1851 – February 22, 1938) was an American botanist and pioneering plant pathologist. In 1885, he became the first scientist to study the diseases of economic plants for the United States Department of Agriculture (USDA). He became the first head of the USDA's Division of Agrostology in 1894, remaining in that position until 1901.

== Early life ==
Franklin Pierce Lamson was born April 19, 1851, in Cambridgeport, Massachusetts. His parents Joseph Sanborn and Eunice Ellen (Winslow) Lamson died when he was 3 years old and he was adopted by the Virgil Scribner family near Manchester, Maine. He received preparatory education at Hebron Academy, Kents Hill School, and Coburn Classical Institute and graduated from Maine State College of Agriculture and Mechanic Arts in 1873.

== Career ==
Lamson-Scribner taught botany in Maine high schools, before becoming an officer with Girard College in 1877. He was the botanist for the Northern Transcontinental Survey and completed an inventory of grasses and forages in Montana in the summer of 1883. In May 1885, he was appointed as an assistant in the USDA Division of Botany. His role was to study parasitic fungi affecting crops and he became the chief of the USDA Section of Mycology in 1886. Initial efforts focused on the control of downy mildew and black rot in grapes. Working with farmers he was able to try different disease control formulations and collect statistical data related to plant infection. In 1887, he established USDA stations for controlled experiments with farm owners as special agents. The section was also renamed to the Section of Vegetable Pathology. In 1888, Lamson-Scriber left the USDA to become the head of the Agricultural Experiment Station of the University of Tennessee. However, he returned in 1894 to become the leader of the new USDA Division of Agrostology. He held this role until 1901, when he became the Chief of the Insular Bureau of Agriculture for the Philippine Islands. Upon his return from the Philippines, he was appointed Government Exhibit Board where he prepared exhibits for international exhibitions past his retirement in 1922.

The standard author abbreviation Scribn. is used to indicate this person as the author when citing a botanical name.

== Awards ==
- 1922 Honorary LL.D. University of Maine
- 1890 Knight of the French Order of Agricultural Merit

== Selected works ==
- Weeds of Maine (1869)
- Black rot (Laestadia bidwellii) with Pierre Viala (1888)
- Diseases of the Irish potato (1889)
- Fungus diseases of the grape and other plants and their treatment (1890)
- American Grasses (1897)
