= Stenella vangueriae =

Scientific classification
- Kingdom: Fungi
- Division: Ascomycota
- Class: Dothideomycetes
- Order: Mycosphaerellales
- Family: Teratosphaeriaceae
- Genus: Stenella
- Species: S. vangueriae

Binomial name
- Stenella vangueriae Deighton

Species of fungus

Stenella vangueriae is a species of anamorphic fungus.

== Description ==
Belonging to the genus Stenella, this species is a Cercospora-like fungus with a superficial secondary mycelium, solitary conidiophores, conidiogenous cells with thickened and darkened conidiogenous loci and catenate or single conidia with dark, slightly thickened hila.

== See also ==
- Stenella stipae
- Stenella subsanguinea
- Stenella tristaniae
