= Stenella iteae =

Scientific classification
- Kingdom: Fungi
- Division: Ascomycota
- Class: Dothideomycetes
- Order: Capnodiales
- Family: Teratosphaeriaceae
- Genus: Stenella
- Species: S. iteae

Binomial name
- Stenella iteae Kirschner

Species of fungus

Stenella iteae is a species of anamorphic fungus.

== Description ==
Belonging to the Stenella genus, this species is a Cercospora-like fungus with a superficial secondary mycelium, solitary conidiophores, conidiogenous cells with thickened and darkened conidiogenous loci and catenate or single conidia with dark, slightly thickened hila. This species is characterised by the absence of stromata, its long conidiophores developing from the external mycelium and conidia mostly with 1 to 2 septa.
