= Stenella deightoniana =

Scientific classification
- Kingdom: Fungi
- Division: Ascomycota
- Class: Dothideomycetes
- Order: Capnodiales
- Family: Teratosphaeriaceae
- Genus: Stenella
- Species: S. deightoniana

Binomial name
- Stenella deightoniana U. Braun

Species of fungus

Stenella deightoniana is a species of anamorphic fungus.
