= Melica hyalina =

Scientific classification
- Kingdom: Plantae
- Clade: Tracheophytes
- Clade: Angiosperms
- Clade: Monocots
- Clade: Commelinids
- Order: Poales
- Family: Poaceae
- Subfamily: Pooideae
- Genus: Melica
- Species: M. hyalina

Binomial name
- Melica hyalina Döll

Species of grass

Melica hyalina is a species of grass found in Brazil and southern South America.

== Description ==
The species is perennial with elongated rhizomes and erect culms which are 50–100 centimetres (20–39 in) long. The leaf-sheaths are tubular and are closed on one end, with its surface being glabrous or pilose. The leaf-blades are flat with scaberulous surface and acuminate apex. They are 4–20 centimetres (1.6–7.9 in) long by 3–6 millimetres (0.12–0.24 in) wide. The membrane is eciliated and is 4.5–9 millimetres (0.18–0.35 in) long. The panicle is open, linear, is 6–25 centimetres (2.4–9.8 in) long and carry some spikelets. The main panicle branches are appressed with dominant and scabrous axis.

Spikelets are obovate, solitary, 7–10 millimetres (0.28–0.39 in) long and have 2 fertile spikelets that are pediceled. The pedicels are ciliate, curved, filiform, and hairy above. The spikelets have 2 fertile florets which are diminished at the apex while the sterile florets are barren, lanceolate and clumped. Both the upper and lower glumes are keelless and membranous, but every other feature is different; Lower glume is flabellate and is 7–10 millimetres (0.28–0.39 in) long with erosed apex. Upper glume is lanceolate and is 7–9 millimetres (0.28–0.35 in) long with an obtuse apex.

Its lemma have scabrous surface and obtuse apex while the fertile lemma is chartaceous, elliptic, keelless and is 5–7 millimetres (0.20–0.28 in) by 2–2.4 millimetres (0.079–0.094 in). Its palea have ciliolated keels and smooth surface. Flowers are 0.2–0.3 millimetres (0.0079–0.0118 in) long, fleshy, oblong and truncate. They also grow together, have 2 lodicules and 3 anthers which are 0.6–1.2 millimetres (0.024–0.047 in) long. The fruits are ellipsoid and caryopses with additional pericarp. They are also dark brown in colour, 2.5–2.8 millimetres (0.098–0.110 in) long, and have linear hilum.
