= Stenella paulliniae =

Scientific classification
- Kingdom: Fungi
- Division: Ascomycota
- Class: Dothideomycetes
- Order: Capnodiales
- Family: Teratosphaeriaceae
- Genus: Stenella
- Species: S. paulliniae

Binomial name
- Stenella paulliniae Schub. & Braun

Species of fungus

Stenella paulliniae is a species of anamorphic fungus.
