= Melica parodiana =

Scientific classification
- Kingdom: Plantae
- Clade: Tracheophytes
- Clade: Angiosperms
- Clade: Monocots
- Clade: Commelinids
- Order: Poales
- Family: Poaceae
- Subfamily: Pooideae
- Genus: Melica
- Species: M. parodiana

Binomial name
- Melica parodiana Torres

Species of grass

Melica parodiana is a species of grass found in Buenos Aires, Argentina and Uruguay.

== Description ==
The species is perennial and caespitose with short rhizomes. They are also clumped, while culms are erect and are 30–50 centimetres (12–20 in) long. The plant stem is scabrous and glabrous. The leaf-sheaths are pubescent, tubular, and are closed on one end. The leaf-blades are flat and are 2–12 centimetres (0.79–4.72 in) long by 2–3.5 millimetres (0.079–0.138 in) wide. It eciliate membrane have a ligule which is 0.5–5 millimetres (0.020–0.197 in) long and have pubescent surface. The panicle is open, linear and is 10–14 centimetres (3.9–5.5 in) long. The axis of the panicle is dominant while the main panicle branches are appressed and smooth.

Spikelets are elliptic, solitary, are 7–8.5 millimetres (0.28–0.33 in) long and have fertile spikelets that are pediceled. The pedicels are curved, filiform, pubescent, and hairy above. Besides being pediceled they also have 1-2 fertile florets which are diminished at the apex. Sterile florets are barren, cuneate, clumped and are 1.5–2 millimetres (0.059–0.079 in) long. The species' rhachilla is scaberulous while callus is pubescent. Both the upper and lower glumes are keelless and membranous. Their other features are different though; Lower glume is obovate, 7–8.5 millimetres (0.28–0.33 in) long with an obtuse apex, while the upper one is lanceolate, 4–6 millimetres (0.16–0.24 in) long, and have an acute apex.

The species' lemma have ciliated and hairy margins with obtuse apex. The hairs are 0.8–1 millimetre (0.031–0.039 in) long while the fertile lemma is chartaceous, lanceolate, and is 4.5–5.5 millimetres (0.18–0.22 in) long by 2 millimetres (0.079 in) wide. Its palea have ciliolated keels and emarginated apex. It is also oblanceolate, 3.5–4 millimetres (0.14–0.16 in) long and is 2 veined. Flowers are fleshy, oblong, truncate and are 0.2 millimetres (0.0079 in) long. They also grow together, and have 3 anthers that are 0.6–1.2 millimetres (0.024–0.047 in) long. The fruits have caryopsis with additional pericarp and linear hilum. They also are ellipsoid and are 3 millimetres (0.12 in) long.

== Ecology ==
It is found in cracks of the rocky slopes. Its flowering time is from late October to early November.
