= Melica decipiens =

Scientific classification
- Kingdom: Plantae
- Clade: Tracheophytes
- Clade: Angiosperms
- Clade: Monocots
- Clade: Commelinids
- Order: Poales
- Family: Poaceae
- Subfamily: Pooideae
- Genus: Melica
- Species: M. decipiens

Binomial name
- Melica decipiens Caro

Species of grass

Melica decipiens is a species of grass that can be found in the mountains of Cordoba and San Luis provinces of Argentina.

== Description ==
The species is perennial with elongated rhizomes and erect culms which are 25–70 centimetres (9.8–27.6 in) long. The leaf-sheaths are tubular and are closed on one end with the surface being glabrous. The leaf-blades are flat, stiff, and are 5–15 centimetres (2.0–5.9 in) long by 2–3 millimetres (0.079–0.118 in) wide. They are also scabrous, with the same goes for margins and surface while the apex is attenuate. The membrane is eciliated, 1.5–2.5 millimetres (0.059–0.098 in) long and is lacerate. The panicle itself is open, linear, is 12–20 centimetres (4.7–7.9 in) long and carry 4–6 fertile spikelets.

Spikelets are obovate, solitary, 7.5–10 millimetres (0.30–0.39 in) long and have pediceled fertile spikelets. The pedicels are ciliate, curved, filiform, and hairy above. The spikelets have 2 fertile florets which are diminished at the apex while the sterile florets are barren, lanceolate, clumped and are 2–2.5 millimetres (0.079–0.098 in) long. Its rhachilla have scaberulous internodes while the floret callus is glabrous. Both the upper and lower glumes are keelless, membranous, and have acute apexes but have different size and description; Lower glume is obovate and is 7.5–10 millimetres (0.30–0.39 in) long while upper one is elliptic and is 5–7 millimetres (0.20–0.28 in) long. The species' lemma have eciliated margins while its fertile one is chartaceous, elliptic, and is 4.5–5.5 millimetres (0.18–0.22 in) long by 2–2.5 millimetres (0.079–0.098 in) wide. Its palea have ciliolated keels and is of the same length as fertile lemma. Flowers are fleshy, glabrous and truncate. They also grow together and are 0.2 millimetres (0.0079 in) long with 2 lodicules. The 3 anthers are 1–2 millimetres (0.039–0.079 in) long. The fruits are 3 millimetres (0.12 in) long and ellipsoid. They also have caryopsis with additional pericarp and linear hilum.
