= Melica onoei =

Scientific classification
- Kingdom: Plantae
- Clade: Tracheophytes
- Clade: Angiosperms
- Clade: Monocots
- Clade: Commelinids
- Order: Poales
- Family: Poaceae
- Subfamily: Pooideae
- Genus: Melica
- Species: M. onoei

Binomial name
- Melica onoei Franchet & Savatier, Enum.

Synonyms
- Melica matsumurae Hackel; Melica kumana Honda

Species of plant

Melica onoei is a species of grass found in China, Japan, Korea, Pakistan and Taiwan.

== Description ==
The species is perennial and have elongated rhizomes. It culms are 75–110 centimetres (30–43 in) long. The species leaf-sheaths are tubular and smooth with one of their length being closed. It eciliate membrane is 0.5–1 millimetre (0.020–0.039 in) long and is truncate. They also have flat leaf-blades which are 20–35 millimetres (0.79–1.38 in) long by 3.5–11 millimetres (0.14–0.43 in) wide and have scaberulous and hispid surface. Both the leaf-sheaths and leaf-blades have glabrous surface.

The panicle itself is open and is 30–35 centimetres (12–14 in) long with the main branches being distant from each other and are 7–12 centimetres (2.8–4.7 in) long. The spikelets themselves are solitary and oblong and are made out of 2 fertile florets that are 6.5–8 millimetres (0.26–0.31 in) long. Fertile spikelets are pediceled and have rhachilla stems that are 2 millimetres (0.079 in) long. Florets are diminished at the apex.

Its lemma have scaberulous surface and emarginated apex with fertile lemma being chartaceous elliptic, keelless, and 4.5–5.5 millimetres (0.18–0.22 in) long. Both the lower and upper glumes are elliptic, keelless, membranous, and have acute apexes. Their size is different; Lower glume is 2.5–3.3 millimetres (0.098–0.130 in) long while the upper one is 4–5 millimetres (0.16–0.20 in) long. Palea is 2-veined. Flowers are fleshy, oblong, truncate, have 2 lodicules, and grow together. They have 3 anthers which are 0.8–1.5 millimetres (0.031–0.059 in) long with fruits that are caryopsis and have an additional pericarp with linear hilum.

== Ecology ==
It is found on hillsides, gullies, and roadsides on elevation of 400–2,500 metres (1,300–8,200 ft). It blooms from May to October.
