= Stenella lythri =

Scientific classification
- Kingdom: Fungi
- Division: Ascomycota
- Class: Dothideomycetes
- Order: Capnodiales
- Family: Teratosphaeriaceae
- Genus: Stenella
- Species: S. lythri

Binomial name
- Stenella lythri J.L. Mulder

Species of fungus

Stenella lythri is a species of anamorphic fungus.
