= Melica spartinoides =

Scientific classification
- Kingdom: Plantae
- Clade: Tracheophytes
- Clade: Angiosperms
- Clade: Monocots
- Clade: Commelinids
- Order: Poales
- Family: Poaceae
- Subfamily: Pooideae
- Genus: Melica
- Species: M. spartinoides

Binomial name
- Melica spartinoides L.B.Sm.

Species of grass

Melica spartinoides, is a species of grass in the family Poaceae that is endemic to the Brazilian state of Santa Catarina.

== Description ==
The species is perennial and caespitose with short rhizomes. It culms are erect and are 50–100 centimetres (20–39 in) long. The species' leaf-sheaths are scabrous, tubular, keeled and are closed on one end with its ligule having eciliate membrane. Panicle is inflorescent, is contracted, oblong, have a secund branches and is 22 centimetres (8.7 in) long. The panicles have filiform and pubescent pedicels. The spikelets are solitary while it florets are diminished at the apex.

Its fertile lemma is chartaceous, lanceolate and is 5–6 millimetres (0.20–0.24 in) long. The glumes are different from each other. The lemma itself have ciliated margins with acute apex. Lower glume is obovate and is 4 millimetres (0.16 in) long while the upper is lanceolate and is 5.5 millimetres (0.22 in) long. Palea is 4 millimetres (0.16 in) long and is 2-veined. It sterile florets are barren, cuneate, and grow in a clump. Flowers are fleshy, oblong, truncate, and have 3 anthers with 2 lodicules. Species' fruits are caryopsis, ellipsoid, and have an additional pericarp. It is also 2.5 millimetres (0.098 in) long and have a linear hilum as well.

== Ecology ==
It is found in fields growing on elevation of 600–1,000 metres (2,000–3,300 ft). It blooms only in February.
