= Melica eligulata =

Scientific classification
- Kingdom: Plantae
- Clade: Tracheophytes
- Clade: Angiosperms
- Clade: Monocots
- Clade: Commelinids
- Order: Poales
- Family: Poaceae
- Subfamily: Pooideae
- Genus: Melica
- Species: M. eligulata

Binomial name
- Melica eligulata Boiss.

Synonyms
- Melica angustifolia Boiss. & Blanche; Melica minuta subsp. angustifolia (Boiss. & Blanche) W.Hempel

Species of grass

Melica eligulata is a species of grass in the family Poaceae. It is native to Afghanistan, Iran, Iraq, Lebanon, Syria, and Turkey.

== Description ==
The species is perennial and is caespitose as well. It culms are 30–50 centimetres (12–20 in) long and 1–1.5 millimetres (0.039–0.059 in) wide. The leaf-sheaths are smooth, tubular and have one closed end. The leaf-blades are 6–12 centimetres (2.4–4.7 in) long and 1–2.5 millimetres (0.039–0.098 in) wide while the membrane is eciliated and is 0–0.5 millimetres (0–0.02 in) long. Both leaf-sheaths and leaf-blades have glabrous surface. The panicle is open, dense, linear, nodding and is 5–10 centimetres (2.0–3.9 in) long. The main panicle branches are ascending and are divided.

Spikelets are oblong, solitary and are 5–7 millimetres (0.20–0.28 in) long. They have fertile spikelets that are pediceled, the pedicels of which are 1–12 millimetres (0.039–0.47 in) long. Lemma is chartaceous, lanceolated, and is 6–8.5 millimetres (0.24–0.33 in) long and 1.6–2 millimetres (0.063–0.079 in) wide. Its lemma have an obtuse apex while the fertile lemma itself is chartaceous, keelless, oblong and is 5.5 millimetres (0.22 in) long. The species also carry 2–3 sterile florets which are barren, cuneate, clumped and are 2–2.5 millimetres (0.079–0.098 in) long. Both the upper and lower glumes are oblong, keelless, and are membranous. Their size is different though; lower one is 2.5–4.5 millimetres (0.098–0.177 in) long while the upper one is 3.5–6.5 millimetres (0.14–0.26 in) long. It palea is 2-veined.

Flowers are fleshy, oblong, truncate, have 2 lodicules and grow together. They have 3 anthers with fruits that are caryopses. The fruit also have additional pericarp with a linear hilum.

== Ecology ==
Melica eligulata grows in the same forests where Turkish pines are found and on elevation of 150–1,100 metres (490–3,600 ft) on rocks and crevices.
