= Melica rigida =

Scientific classification
- Kingdom: Plantae
- Clade: Tracheophytes
- Clade: Angiosperms
- Clade: Monocots
- Clade: Commelinids
- Order: Poales
- Family: Poaceae
- Subfamily: Pooideae
- Genus: Melica
- Species: M. rigida

Binomial name
- Melica rigida Cav.

Species of grass

Melica rigida is a species of grass found in Argentina, Brazil (Santa Catarina, Rio Grande do Sul), and Uruguay.

== Description ==
The species is perennial with short rhizomes. It culms are erected and 20–75 centimetres (7.9–29.5 in) long while the plant stem is smooth. The leaf-sheaths are scabrous, tubular, closed on one end and are glabrous on surface. The leaf-blades are flat, stiff, and are 3–9 centimetres (1.2–3.5 in) long by 2–2.5 millimetres (0.079–0.098 in) wide. They also have scabrous margins and surface, the later one of which is rough. The eciliate membrane have a ligule which is 0.5–5 millimetres (0.020–0.197 in) long and have a pubescent surface. The panicle is open, linear, and is 6–20 centimetres (2.4–7.9 in) long by 1–2 centimetres (0.39–0.79 in) wide. The main panicle branches are appressed with scaberulous and dominant axis.

It spikelets are elliptic, solitary and are 8–11 millimetres (0.31–0.43 in) long. Fertile spikelets have pedicels which are curved filiform, and scabrous. They also have 2 fertile florets which are diminished at the apex with its rhachilla internodes being scaberulous. The floret callus is pubescent and have hairs which are 0.1–0.3 millimetres (0.0039–0.0118 in) long. The glumes are dissimilar and are keelless and membranous, with other features being different; Lower glume is obovate, 8–11 millimetres (0.31–0.43 in) long with an obtuses apex, while the upper one is lanceolate, 4–6 millimetres (0.16–0.24 in) long and have an acute apex.

Lemma have ciliated margins, scaberulous surface, acute apex with the hairs being 0.5 millimetres (0.020 in) long. It fertile lemma is chartaceous, elliptic and is 5.5–8.5 millimetres (0.22–0.33 in) long by 2–2.5 millimetres (0.079–0.098 in) wide. The species' palea have ciliolated keels, smooth surface and dentated apex. Flowers are fleshy, oblong and truncate. They also grow together, 0.3–0.5 millimetres (0.012–0.020 in) long, have 2 lodicules and 3 anthers, the later one of which are 1–1.5 millimetres (0.039–0.059 in) long. Fruits are dark brown in colour, have caryopsis and additional pericarp. They also have linear hilum while their size is 2.5–3 millimetres (0.098–0.118 in) long.

== Ecology ==
In Brazil, the species is found growing in fields on the elevation of 1,000–1,200 metres (3,300–3,900 ft).
