= Melica grandiflora =

Scientific classification
- Kingdom: Plantae
- Clade: Embryophytes
- Clade: Tracheophytes
- Clade: Angiosperms
- Clade: Monocots
- Clade: Commelinids
- Order: Poales
- Family: Poaceae
- Subfamily: Pooideae
- Genus: Melica
- Species: M. grandiflora

Binomial name
- Melica grandiflora Koidz.

Synonyms
- Melica komarovii

Species of grass

Melica grandiflora is a species of grass that can be found in Japan, Korea and China.

== Description ==
The species is perennial and caespitose with culms that are 15–70 centimetres (5.9–27.6 in) long. The leaf-sheaths are tubular and are closed on one end while the leaf-blades are 4–20 centimetres (1.6–7.9 in) long and 2–6 millimetres (0.079–0.236 in) wide. The membrane is eciliated, 0.3–0.7 millimetres (0.012–0.028 in) long, and is pubescent on the surface. The panicle is open, linear, is 3–15 centimetres (1.2–5.9 in) long and carry 4–6 fertile spikelets. The main panicle branches are indistinct and almost racemose.

Spikelets are oblong, pendulous and solitary. They are also 6–8 millimetres (0.24–0.31 in) long and have fertile spikelets that are pediceled. The pedicels are filiform, curved, and puberulous. The spikelets have 1-2 fertile flores which are diminished at the apex while the sterile florets are only 2-3 in number and are barren, lanceolate, clumped and are 2 millimetres (0.079 in) long. Both the upper and lower glumes are keelless, membranous, and oblong. They are also 4–6 millimetres (0.16–0.24 in) long and have obtuse apexes. Its palea have thick keels and obtuse apex. Flowers are fleshy, oblong and truncate. They also grow together and have 3 anthers that are 1.5–1.8 millimetres (0.059–0.071 in) long. The fruits are caryopsis with additional pericarp and linear hilum.

== Ecology ==
Melica grandiflora can be found growing on mountain slopes on the elevation of 500–3,200 metres (1,600–10,500 ft), in forests and shrubs and on roadsides that are weedy or grassy. Its flowering time is April to July.
