= Stenella aucklandica =

Scientific classification
- Kingdom: Fungi
- Division: Ascomycota
- Class: Dothideomycetes
- Order: Capnodiales
- Family: Teratosphaeriaceae
- Genus: Stenella
- Species: S. aucklandica

Binomial name
- Stenella aucklandica Brown & Hill

Species of fungus

Stenella aucklandica is a species of anamorphic fungus.
