= Stenella vermiculata =

Scientific classification
- Kingdom: Fungi
- Division: Ascomycota
- Class: Dothideomycetes
- Order: Capnodiales
- Family: Teratosphaeriaceae
- Genus: Stenella
- Species: S. vermiculata

Binomial name
- Stenella vermiculata J.L. Mulder

Species of fungus

Stenella vermiculata is a species of anamorphic fungus.

== Description ==
Belonging to the Stenella genus, this species is a Cercospora-like fungus with a superficial secondary mycelium, solitary conidiophores, conidiogenous cells with thickened and darkened conidiogenous loci and catenate or single conidia with dark, slightly thickened hila.
