= Stenella gahniae =

Scientific classification
- Kingdom: Fungi
- Division: Ascomycota
- Class: Dothideomycetes
- Order: Capnodiales
- Family: Teratosphaeriaceae
- Genus: Stenella
- Species: S. gahniae

Binomial name
- Stenella gahniae McKenzie

Species of fungus

Stenella gahniae is a species of anamorphic fungus.
