= Stenella anthuriicola =

Scientific classification
- Kingdom: Fungi
- Division: Ascomycota
- Class: Dothideomycetes
- Order: Capnodiales
- Family: Teratosphaeriaceae
- Genus: Stenella
- Species: S. anthuriicola

Binomial name
- Stenella anthuriicola U.Braun & C.F.Hill

Synonyms
- Zasmidium anthuriicola (U.Braun & C.F.Hill) Crous & U.Braun

Species of fungus

Stenella anthuriicola is a species of anamorphic fungus in the family Mycosphaerellaceae. It grows on the leaves of Anthurium plants in Thailand.
