= Stenella novae-zelandiae =

Scientific classification
- Kingdom: Fungi
- Division: Ascomycota
- Class: Dothideomycetes
- Order: Capnodiales
- Family: Teratosphaeriaceae
- Genus: Stenella
- Species: S. novae-zelandiae

Binomial name
- Stenella novae-zelandiae Matsush.

Species of fungus

Stenella novae-zelandiae is a species of anamorphic fungus.
