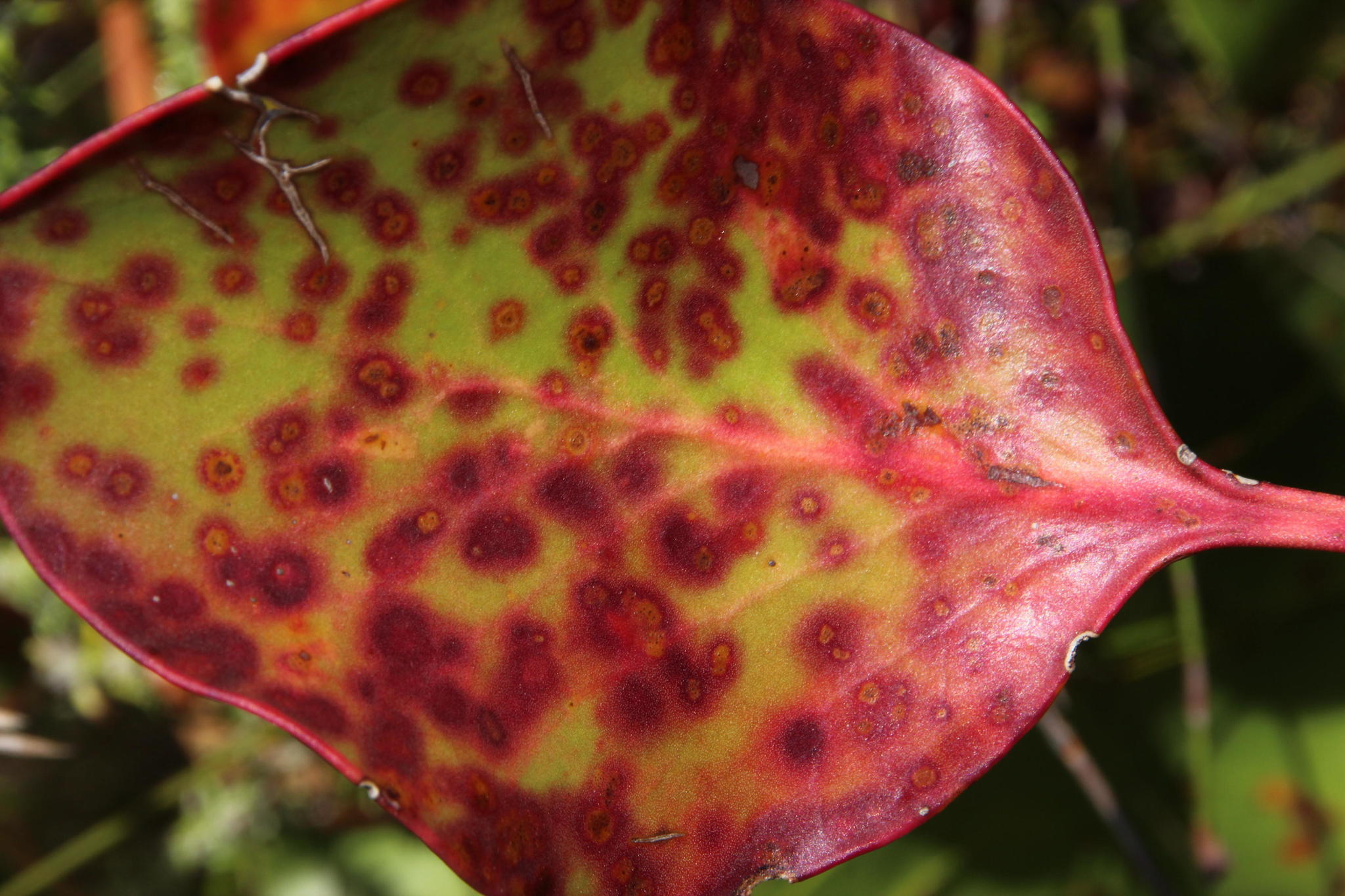
- Teratosphaeria maculiformis

Scientific classification
- Kingdom: Fungi
- Division: Ascomycota
- Class: Dothideomycetes
- Order: Mycosphaerellales
- Family: Teratosphaeriaceae
- Genus: Teratosphaeria; Syd. & P.Syd. (1912)

Type species
- Teratosphaeria fibrillosa Syd. & P.Syd. (1912)

= Teratosphaeria =

Genus of fungi

Teratosphaeria is a genus of fungi in the family Teratosphaeriaceae; according to the 2007 Outline of Ascomycota, it was placed in the Phaeosphaeriaceae, but the placement within this family was uncertain. It was confirmed in 2020, within Teratosphaeriaceae by Wijayawardene et al. 2020.

Species Teratosphaeria zuluensis (formerly Coniothyrium zuluense) is found on Eucalyptus camaldulensis in Ethiopia causing stem cankers.

== Species ==
As accepted by Species Fungorum;

- Teratosphaeria agapanthi (Kalchbr. & Cooke) Crous (2011)
- Teratosphaeria alboconidia Crous & Summerell (2009)
- Teratosphaeria alcornii Crous (2009)
- Teratosphaeria angophorae (Andjic, Carnegie & P.A. Barber) Andjic, Carnegie & P.A. Barber (2009)
- Teratosphaeria aurantia Whyte & Andjic (2010)
- Teratosphaeria australiensis (B. Sutton) Crous (2009)
- Teratosphaeria biformis Whyte & Andjic (2010)
- Teratosphaeria blakelyi (Crous & Summerell) Crous & Summerell (2009)
- Teratosphaeria brunneotingens (Crous & Summerell) Crous & Summerell (2009)
- Teratosphaeria calophylla K. Taylor, Andjic, P.A. Barber, G.E. Hardy & T.I. Burgess (2012)
- Teratosphaeria combreti Crous (2021)
- Teratosphaeria complicata Crous & Summerell (2009)
- Teratosphaeria considenianae (Crous & Summerell) Crous & Summerell (2009)
- Teratosphaeria coolabuniensis G.S. Pegg & Carnegie (2011)
- Teratosphaeria corymbiae (Carnegie, Andjic & P.A. Barber) Carnegie, Andjic & P.A. Barber (2009)
- Teratosphaeria corymbiicola Crous (2019)
- Teratosphaeria crispata Carnegie (2011)
- Teratosphaeria delegatensis (R.F. Park & Keane) Crous (2019)
- Teratosphaeria destructans (M.J. Wingf. & Crous) M.J. Wingf. & Crous (2009)
- Teratosphaeria dimorpha (Crous & Carnegie) Crous & Summerell (2009)
- Teratosphaeria dispersa E. Müll. & Oehrens (1982)
- Teratosphaeria dunnii Crous & Carnegie (2019)
- Teratosphaeria encephalarti Crous & A.R. Wood (2008)
- Teratosphaeria eucalypti (Cooke & Massee) Crous (2009)
- Teratosphaeria fibrillosa Syd. & P. Syd. (1912)
- Teratosphaeria fimbriata (Crous & Summerell) Crous & U. Braun (2007)
- Teratosphaeria foliensis Andjic & S. Jacks. (2010)
- Teratosphaeria gauchensis (M.-N. Cortinas, Crous & M.J. Wingf.) M.J. Wingf. & Crous (2009)
- Teratosphaeria gracilis Crous (2018)
- Teratosphaeria henryi Crous & Carnegie (2019)
- Teratosphaeria hortaea Crous & M.J. Wingf. (2009)
- Teratosphaeria juvenalis Crous & M.J. Wingf. (2009)
- Teratosphaeria lilianiae (J. Walker, B. Sutton & Pascoe) Crous & Andjic (2009)
- Teratosphaeria macowanii (Sacc.) Crous (2009)
- Teratosphaeria maculiformis (G. Winter) Joanne E. Taylor & Crous (1999)
- Teratosphaeria majorizuluensis Crous & Summerell (2009)
- Teratosphaeria mareebensis Crous & R.G. Shivas (2011)
- Teratosphaeria maxii (Crous) Crous & U. Braun (2007)
- Teratosphaeria mexicana (Crous) Crous & U. Braun (2007)
- Teratosphaeria micromaculata Whyte & Andjic (2010)
- Teratosphaeria microspora Joanne E. Taylor & Crous (2000)
- Teratosphaeria miniata Crous & Summerell (2009)
- Teratosphaeria molleriana (Thüm.) Crous & U. Braun (2007)
- Teratosphaeria multiseptata (Carnegie) Carnegie (2009)
- Teratosphaeria novaehollandiae Andjic, T.I. Burgess & A. Maxwell (2016)
- Teratosphaeria ovata (H.J. Swart) Crous & Summerell (2009)
- Teratosphaeria pluritubularis (Crous & Mansilla) Crous & U. Braun (2007)
- Teratosphaeria praelongispora Carnegie (2011)
- Teratosphaeria profusa Crous & Carnegie (2009)
- Teratosphaeria proteae-arboreae P.S. van Wyk, Marasas & Knox-Dav. (1975)
- Teratosphaeria pseudocryptica (Crous) Crous & U. Braun (2007)
- Teratosphaeria pseudoeucalypti Andjic & T.I. Burgess (2010)
- Teratosphaeria pseudonubilosa G. Pérez & Carnegie (2019)
- Teratosphaeria quasicercospora (Crous & T.A. Cout.) Crous & U. Braun (2007)
- Teratosphaeria rubida K. Taylor, Andjic, P.A. Barber, G.E. Hardy & T.I. Burgess (2012)
- Teratosphaeria sieberi Crous (2018)
- Teratosphaeria stellenboschiana (Crous) Crous (2009)
- Teratosphaeria syncarpiae (Carnegie & M.J. Wingf.) Carnegie & M.J. Wingf. (2009)
- Teratosphaeria terminaliae Crous & Jol. Roux (2013)
- Teratosphaeria tinarooa Andjic & T.I. Burgess (2010)
- Teratosphaeria tiwiana Andjic, T.I. Burgess & A. Maxwell (2016)
- Teratosphaeria toledana (Crous & Bills) Crous & U. Braun (2007)
- Teratosphaeria velox Crous & Summerell (2009)
- Teratosphaeria verrucosa Crous & M.J. Wingf. (2009)
- Teratosphaeria viscida (Andjic, P.A. Barber & T.I. Burgess) Andjic, P.A. Barber & T.I. Burgess (2009)
- Teratosphaeria wingfieldii (Crous) Crous (2009)
- Teratosphaeria xenocryptica Crous & M.J. Wingf. (2009)
- Teratosphaeria zuluensis (M.J. Wingf., Crous & T.A. Cout.) M.J. Wingf. & Crous (2009)
