= Camarosporula =

Scientific classification
- Kingdom: Fungi
- Division: Ascomycota
- Class: Dothideomycetes
- Order: Capnodiales
- Family: Teratosphaeriaceae
- Genus: Camarosporula; Petr.

Type species
- Camarosporula persooniae (Henn.) Petr.

Synonyms
- Anthracostroma persooniae

Genus of fungi

Camarosporula is a genus of fungi in the class Dothideomycetes. This is a monotypic genus, consisting of the single species Camarosporula persooniae. It has the Teleomorph synonym of Anthracostroma persooniae.

A 2011 study conducted by the NIH found evidence that Camarosporula appears to represent a distinct genus within this (sic: Teratosphaeriaceae) family". This was accepted by Wijayawardene et al. 2020.
