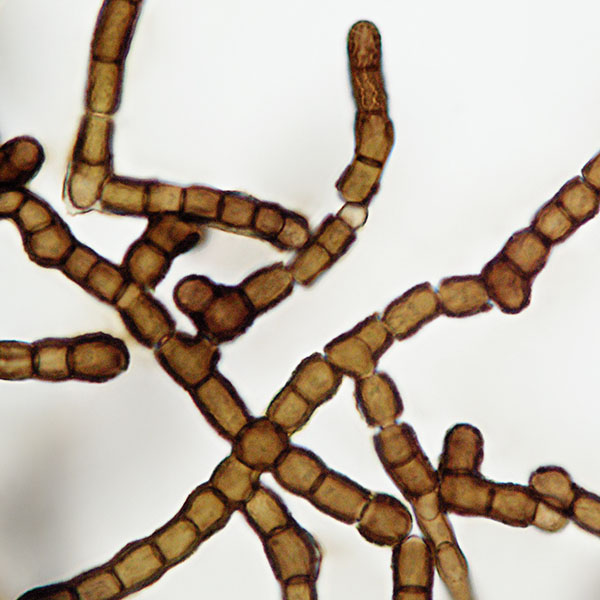
- Photomicrograph of Baudoinia caledoniensis colony growing on Modified Leonian's agar

Scientific classification
- Kingdom: Fungi
- Division: Ascomycota
- Class: Dothideomycetes
- Order: Mycosphaerellales
- Family: Teratosphaeriaceae
- Genus: Baudoinia; J.A.Scott & Unter. (2007)

Type species
- Baudoinia compniacensis (Richon) J.A.Scott & Unter. (2007)

Species
- B. antilliensis; B. caledoniensis; B. compniacensis; B. orientalis; B. panamericana

= Baudoinia =

Genus of fungi

Baudoinia is a fungal genus in the family Teratosphaeriaceae. It was created in 2007 to hold the single species Baudoinia compniacensis, which was formerly known as Torula compniacensis. Four additional species were added to the genus in 2015. All known members have a preference for airborne alcohol. They have been observed on a variety of substrates in the vicinity of distilleries, spirits maturation facilities, bonded warehouses, and bakeries. The fungus is a habitat colonist with a preference for airborne alcohol (e.g. the angels' share), earning them the nickname whiskey fungus.

The genus was named in honor of the 19th-century French pharmacist Antoine Baudoin Poggiale, who first recorded the description of a black, sooty mold that grew near distilleries in Cognac, France. The story of the rediscovery and renaming of this genus was told in an article in the magazine Wired in 2011.

== Description ==
Baudoinia can be identified by its black, effused mycelium that can be velvety or crust-like. It features hyphae which are vegetative, dark brown, thick-walled, and often moniliform; although it lacks distinctive conidiophores. Conidiogenous cells can be found integrated within vegetative hyphae. Its conidia are dry, nonseptate or uniseptate, at the median. The conidia are thick-walled, globose to barrel-shaped, brown to black, and typically found with coarse surface ornamentation, dehiscing by schizolysis. Ramoconidia are absent. Colonies on modified Leonian's agar grow slowly and are dark in pigmentation. Synanamorphs are absent during its asexual reproduction stages. The presence of teleomorphs is unknown.

== Nutrition ==
Baudoinia species use ethanol for their carbon nutrition, but growth rates suggest that this is not their only source of calories. Ethanol in vapour form also accelerates the growth of the fungus and stimulates spore germination. The ability to withstand high temperatures and therefore colonize habitats such as roofing, may be explained by the observation that ethanol vapour stimulates the formation of special heat-protective proteins that prevent cells from being killed under these relatively extreme conditions.

== Ecology ==
Baudoinia is black in colour and is partly responsible for the frequently observed phenomenon of 'Warehouse Staining', reported originally from the walls of buildings near brandy maturation warehouses in Cognac, France. Baudoinia is a cosmopolitan colonist of outdoor surfaces subjected to extreme daily temperature shifts, elevated high relative humidity, periodic wetting, and ambient airborne ethanol. It is known from a wide range of substrates. For example, the UAMH Centre for Global Microfungal Biodiversity lists isolates recovered from tree bark, (Note: Bark: B. panamericana (UAMH 10762, UAMH 10811), B. compniacensis (UAMH 10808 T)) concrete, (Note: Concrete: B. panamericana (UAMH 10764)) PVC plastic, (Note: PVC plastic: B. antilliensis (UAMH 11557, UAMH 10810 T)) galvanized roofing, (Note: Galvanized roofing: B. antilliensis (UAMH 11556)) masonry, (Note: Masonry: B. caledoniensis (UAMH 11553, UAMH 11554), B. panamericana (UAMH 10812)) and stone. (Note: Stone: B. panamericana (UAMH 10763, UAMH 10813))

Baudoinia is not uniquely associated with spirit maturation and manufacture as one sample that was examined came from a commercial bakery, although the fermentation byproducts of yeast include ethanol and its vapors. Ethanol vapor appears to be important in habitat determinant and Baudoinia species may occur in association with natural fermentative processes, such as seasonal fruit drops, bogs, natural composts, etc. B. compniacensis may also occur around places where automotive fuel is stored or transferred, as ethanol is required to be blended with gasoline in most countries.

It has been recorded as a food source of snails and slugs through the radula marks left following grazing.

== Distribution ==
Baudoinia was first investigated in 1872 when Michel Charles Durieu de Maisonneuve and Casimir Roumeguère examined a black, sooty growth found on the walls and roof tiles of buildings near distilleries in Cognac, France, at the instigation of the French pharmacist, Antonin Baudoin. During the process of aging whiskey and certain other liquors, a portion evaporates, colloquially called the "Angel's Share"; this airborne alcohol near barrelhouses can lead to growth of Baudoinia compniacensis in the area, hence the term "whiskey fungus."

It has been widely recorded in Asia, Europe, and the Americas. In 2015, a thorough investigation of the internal transcribed spacer sequence divided the genus into five species:

- B. antilliensis, type locality in the Antilles
- B. caledoniensis, type locality in Scotland
- B. compniacensis, type locality in France
- B. orientalis, type locality in South Korea
- B. panamericana, type locality in the continental Americas, though also occurs in Scotland possibly through the reuse of American bourbon whiskey barrels to age Scotch whisky

There is a clear continental-scale pattern in the distribution in the newly defined species. B. compniacensis now strictly refers to fungi with the same nuclear ITS sequence as the B. compniacensis from France.

== Baudoinia on buildings and plants ==
The fungus often forms a black coating layer on tree bark and leaves. However, this does not seem to harm the plants by blocking the lenticels or significantly reduce their growth rates. Deciduous species also develop new leaves annually, rendering it less important when older leaves are covered by the growths.

The fungus can be removed from buildings using high pressure water jets, bleach, etc. According to a report from the Kentucky government, it has not been shown to cause anything other than cosmetic effects thanks to its mode of nutrition via the carboniferous atmosphere, rather than the decay of building materials in general. Mosses, lichens and algae also grow on solid vertical surfaces, and slopes in the same fashion as the Angel's Share fungus and do not damage the infrastructure of built structures. However, there have been harsher reports as well. James A. Scott, the researcher at the University of Toronto who has studied the fungus and named the genus, said that the fungus is destructive and can damage property. He wrote "It wrecks patio furniture, house siding, almost any outdoor surface. I've seen trees choked to death by it. It is a small mercy that it does not also appear to have a negative impact on human health."

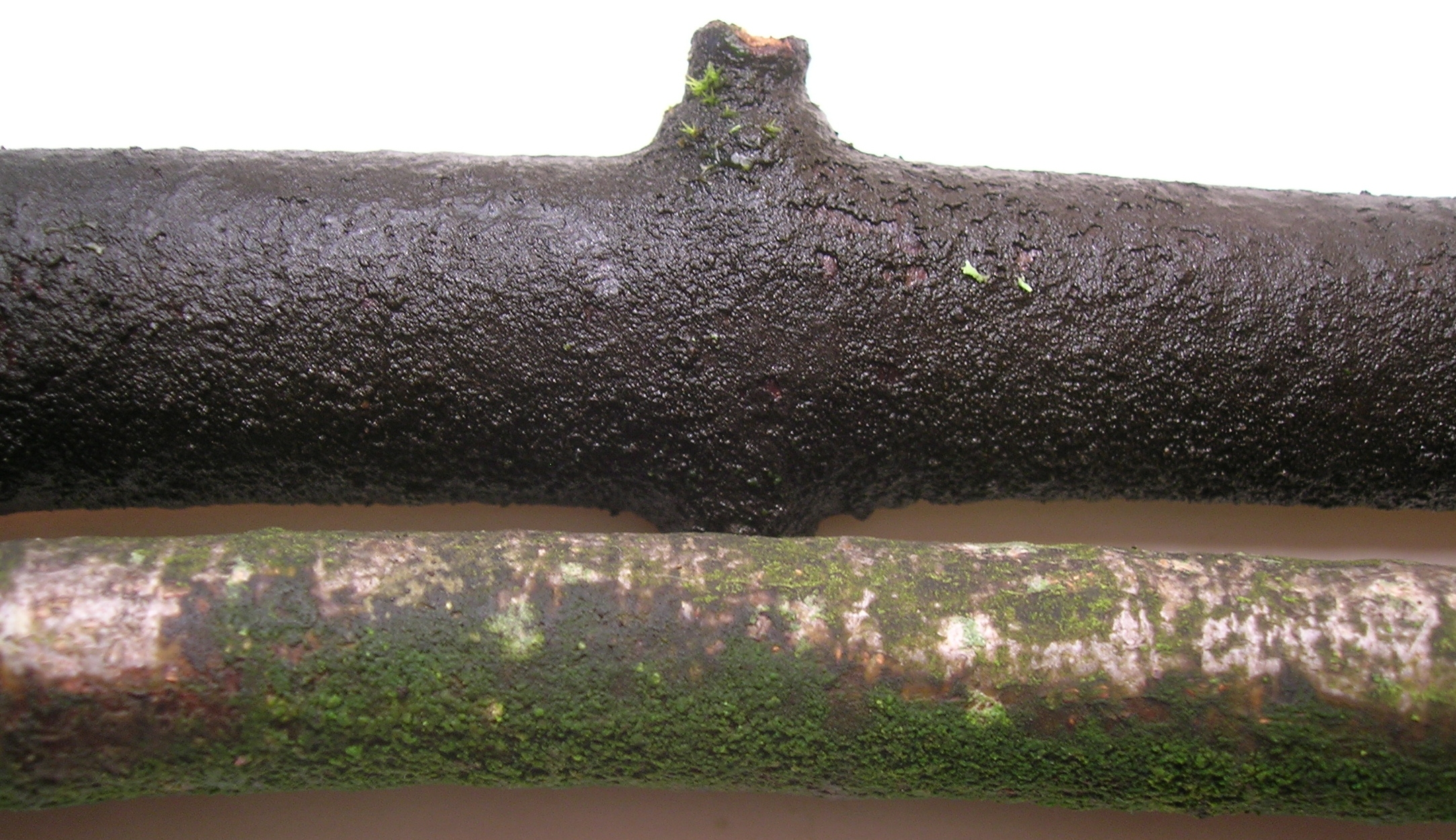
Sycamore (Acer pseudoplatanus) branches showing one with and the other without the Angels' share fungus coating

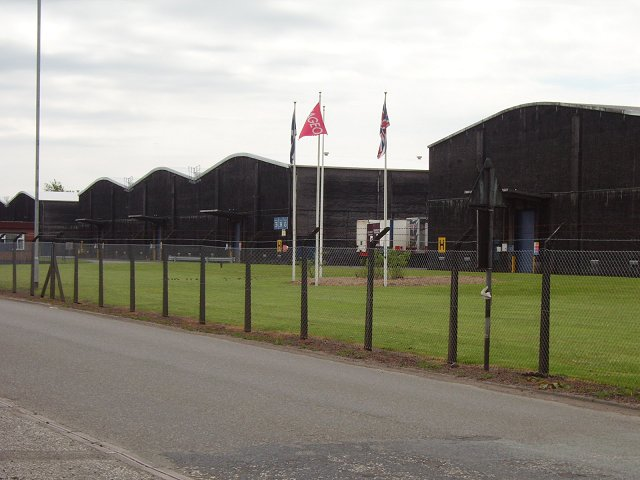
Angels' share fungus blackening a Diageo bonded warehouse in Clackmannanshire, Scotland

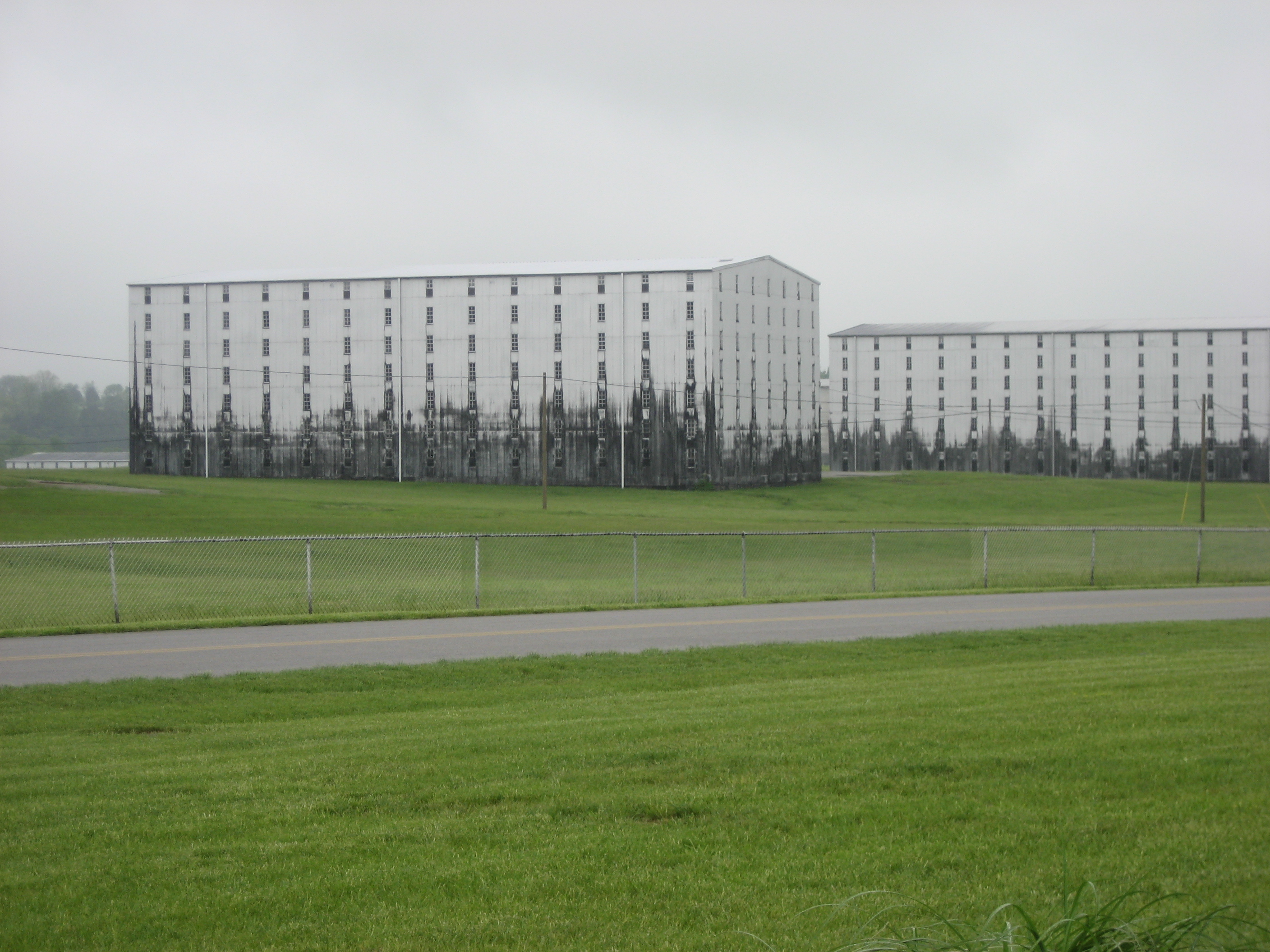
Heaven Hill distillery in Bardstown, Kentucky, US, where fungus is visible on the white warehouses

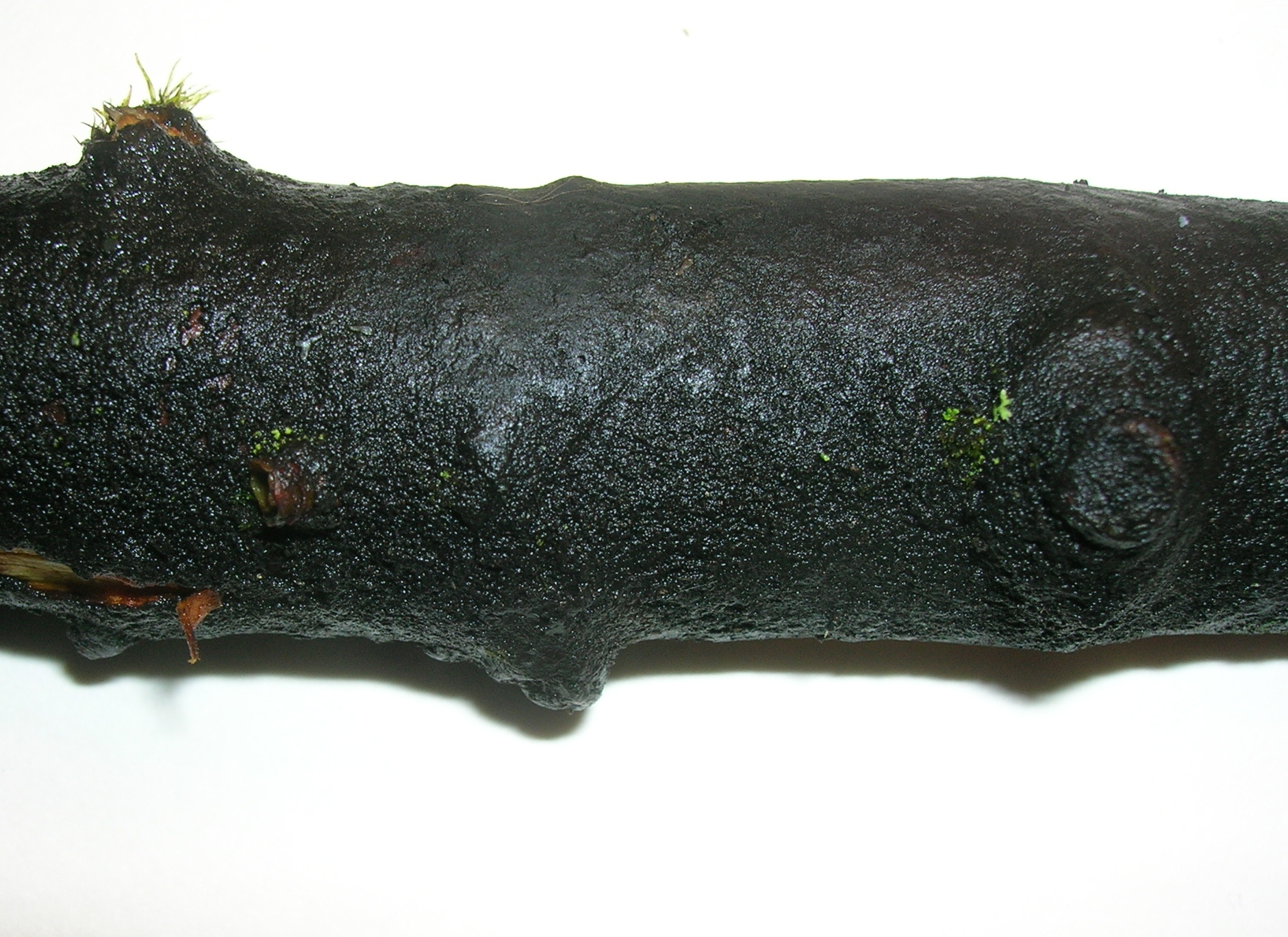
Sycamore twig from Beith, North Ayrshire, Scotland

== Genome sequences ==
Genomic information
- NCBI ID: 483074
- Ploidy: haploid
- Genome size: 21.88 Mb
- Year of completion: 2011

The genome of B. panamericana was completed by the United States Department of Energy's Joint Genome Institute in 2011, using Roche (454), Sanger fosmid, and Illumina sequence data. The completed assembly is 21.88 Mb in size.

== Related fungi ==
The most closely related ascomycetes to Baudoinia spp. appear to be members of the genera Friedmanniomyces and Trimmatostroma. Friedmanniomyces species are rock-inhabiting species known only from the Antarctic. This fits in well with the observed fact that the species favours surfaces that are subjected to great environmental exposure, as in roofing materials that experience extreme diurnal fluctuations in ambient conditions.
