= Aulographina =

Scientific classification
- Kingdom: Fungi
- Division: Ascomycota
- Class: Dothideomycetes
- Order: Mycosphaerellales
- Family: Teratosphaeriaceae
- Genus: Aulographina; Arx & E. Müll.

Type species
- Aulographina pinorum (Desm.) Arx & E. Müll.

Genus of fungi

Aulographina is a genus of fungi. It was placed in the Asterinaceae family. then later placed in the Teratosphaeriaceae family.

== Species ==
As accepted by Species Fungorum;

- Aulographina eucalypti (Cooke & Massee) Arx & E. Müll. (1960)
- Aulographina pinorum (Desm.) Arx & E. Müll. (1960)
