= Placocrea =

Scientific classification
- Kingdom: Fungi
- Division: Ascomycota
- Class: Dothideomycetes
- Order: Mycosphaerellales
- Family: Teratosphaeriaceae
- Genus: Placocrea; Syd.

Genus of fungi

Placocrea is a monotypic genus of fungi, that was originally placed in the family Mycosphaerellaceae. It was latermoed to the Teratosphaeriaceae family in the Mycosphaerellales order.

It only contains one known species Placocrea pulchella. It was published by Hans Sydow in Annls mycol. vol.37 (4/5): 380 in 1939.
