= Caryopsis =

Fruit of the grasses (Poaceae)

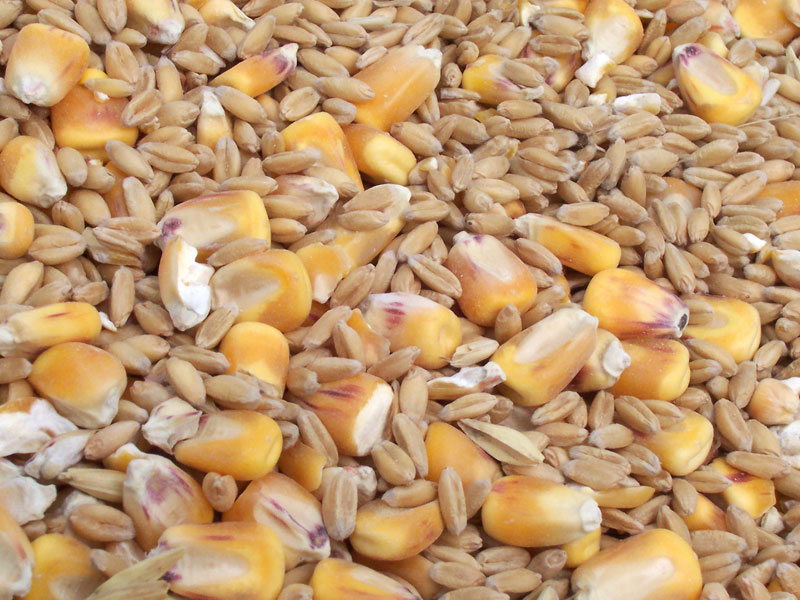
An assortment of different caryopses.

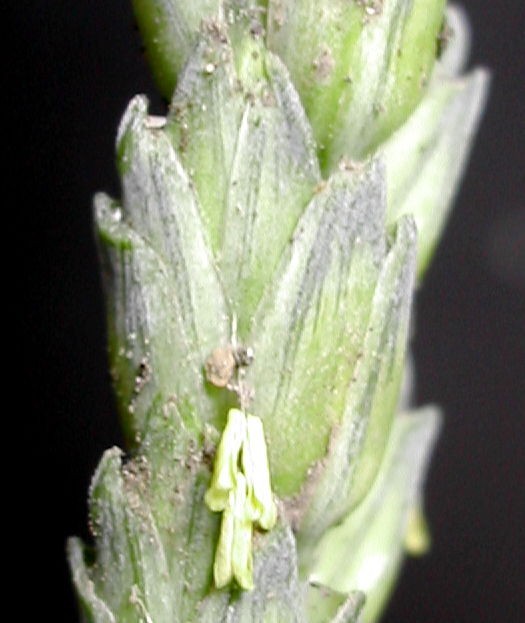
Wheat spikelet with the three anthers sticking out.

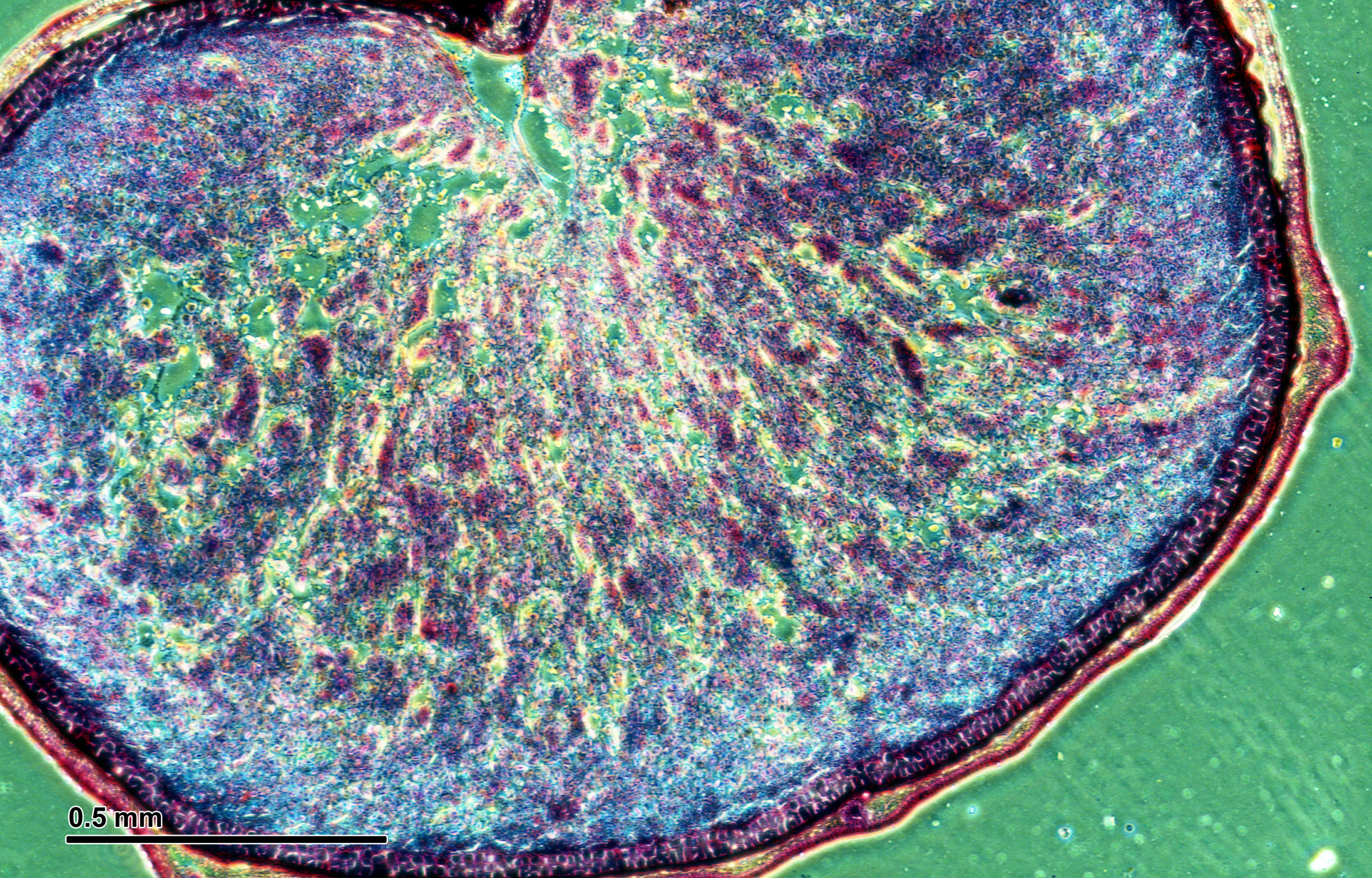
Caryopsis cross-section.

In botany, a caryopsis (pl. caryopses) is a type of simple fruit—one that is monocarpellate (formed from a single carpel) and indehiscent (not opening at maturity) and resembles an achene, except that in a caryopsis the pericarp is fused with the thin seed coat.

The caryopsis is popularly called a grain and is the fruit typical of the family Poaceae (or Gramineae), which includes wheat, rice, maize, and oat.

The term grain is also used in a more general sense as synonymous with cereal (as in "cereal grains", which include some non-Poaceae). Considering that the fruit wall and the seed are intimately fused into a single unit, and the caryopsis or grain is a dry fruit, little concern is given to technically separating the terms fruit and seed in these plant structures. In many grains, the "hulls" to be separated before processing are flower bracts.

== Etymology ==
The name caryopsis is derived from the Greek words karyon and -opsis (κάρυον and ὄψις), meaning 'nut' and 'having the appearance of', respectively. The term was first used by Achille Richard to refer to the dry, monospermic, indehiscent fruit commonly found in grasses.

This definition of fruit for the Gramineae family has persisted to the modern day, but some botanists have challenged the idea that the dry caryopsis is a defining characteristic of the family. The other forms of fruit proposed to be borne by grasses include achenes, utricles, berries, and nuts. However, others have suggested that these differing fruit structures are representative of caryopsis diversity rather than of entirely different structures. This diverse form of the caryopsis would include the follicle-like form of Crypsis and Eleusine where a free pericarp adjoins the seeds which are extruded when moistened (as in an achene or utricle), the berry-like form found in some bamboo genera including Dinochloa and Olmeca where the pericarp is more thick and fleshy, and the nut-like form found in Dendrocalamus and Schizostachyum. By this definition, the caryopsis is truly the only fruit type found in the Gramineae. The types of caryopsis are often distinguished by the terms "modified caryopsis", referring to caryopses with a pericarp not wholly adnate to the seed coat, and "true caryopsis", referring to those with a pericarp totally adherent to the seed coat.
