= Stenella (fungus) =

Scientific classification
- Kingdom: Fungi
- Division: Ascomycota
- Class: Dothideomycetes
- Order: Mycosphaerellales
- Family: Teratosphaeriaceae
- Genus: Stenella; Syd. (1930)

Type species
- Stenella araguata Syd. (1930)

Synonyms
- Biharia Thirum. & Mishra (1953)

Genus of fungi

Stenella is a genus of anamorphic fungi in the family Mycosphaerellaceae. The widespread genus contained about 155 species in 2008.

== Species ==
As accepted by Species Fungorum;

- Stenella aegles S.S. Prasad (1968)
- Stenella africana J.L. Mulder (1982)
- Stenella alyxiae H.Y. Yip (1989)
- Stenella anomoconis de Hoog & Boekhout (1983)
- Stenella antillana R.F. Castañeda & W.B. Kendr. (1991)
- Stenella araguata Syd. (1930)
- Stenella argyreiae Bhalla, A.K. Sarbhoy, M. Kulshr. & K.P.S. Kushwaha (2001)
- Stenella ateramni R.F. Castañeda & W.B. Kendr. (1991)
- Stenella canavaliae-roseae (J.M. Yen & Gilles) J.M. Yen (1982)
- Stenella capparis Kamal, R.P. Singh & P. Kumar (1980)
- Stenella caryotae-urentis R.K. Chaudhary, Tripathi, P.N. Singh & S. Chaudhary (2001)
- Stenella cassiigena S. Chaudhary & R.K. Chaudhary (2003)
- Stenella cedrelae J.M. Yen, A.K. Kar & B.K. Das (1982)
- Stenella chandleri (Hansf.) Suj. Singh & Kamal (1979)
- Stenella coffeae J.M. Yen, A.K. Kar & B.K. Das (1982)
- Stenella constricta J.L. Mulder (1982)
- Stenella cubensis R.F. Castañeda (1985)
- Stenella davillae R.F. Castañeda (1986)
- Stenella doliiformis Matsush. (1983)
- Stenella elaeodendri Kamal, R.P. Singh & P. Kumar (1980)
- Stenella fagraeae J.M. Yen (1967)
- Stenella flacourtiicola R.K. Verma, N. Sharma & Soni (2008)
- Stenella grewiae Bhalla, A.K. Sarbhoy, M. Kulshr. & K.P.S. Kushwaha (2001)
- Stenella laurina (Speg.) J.L. Mulder (1975)
- Stenella liabicola (Petr.) J.L. Mulder (1975)
- Stenella lomatiae Priest (1991)
- Stenella mahoniae R.K. Verma, Budathoki & Kamal (1989)
- Stenella myrsines R. Kirschner (2007)
- Stenella novae-zelandiae Matsush. (1985)
- Stenella osyridina R.K. Chaudhary & S.K. Singh (1996)
- Stenella palmicola Matsush. (1985)
- Stenella prinsepiae M.K. Khan, Budathoki & Kamal (1991)
- Stenella pseudoramularia U. Braun (2001)
- Stenella psychotriae (Chupp & Viégas) Crous & U. Braun (1996)
- Stenella pterocarpi J. Kranz (1968)
- Stenella rhododendricola Seema Misra, A.K. Srivast. & Kamal (1999)
- Stenella rufescens (Speg.) J.L. Mulder (1975)
- Stenella taiwanensis Matsush. (1987)
- Stenella triseptata Matsush. (1983)
- Stenella tristaniae B. Huguenin (1966)
- Stenella uniformis J.L. Mulder (1982)
- Stenella variabilis Matsush. (1983)
- Stenella vermiculata J.L. Mulder (1982)

== Former species ==
As accepted by Species Fungorum. Assume if not mentioned all within Mycosphaerellaceae family

- S. adeniae (Hansf.) Deighton (1979) = Zasmidium adeniae
- S. aeglicola ((S. Das) McKenzie (1982) = Zasmidium aeglicola
- S. agavicola (R.F. Castañeda & L. García (1988) = Zasmidium agavicola
- S. alocasiae (Sarbajna & Chattopadh. (1991) = Zasmidium alocasiae
- S. alpiniae ((Syd. & P. Syd.) U. Braun (2001) = Zasmidium alpiniae
- S. anamirtae (K. Srivast., A.K. Srivast. & Kamal (1995) = Zasmidium anamirtae
- S. annonaceae ((Henn.) U. Braun (1996) = Zasmidium annonaceae
- S. anthuriicola (U. Braun & C.F. Hill (2006) = Zasmidium anthuriicola
- S. aphanamixtidis (Chaudary, Anuradha & M.S. Tripathi (2002) = Zasmidium aphanamixidis
- S. araliae (K. Schub. & U. Braun (2007) = Zasmidium araliae
- S. aspiliae ((J.M. Yen & Gilles) U. Braun (2001) = Zasmidium aspiliae
- S. aucklandica (U. Braun & C.F. Hill (2003) = Zasmidium aucklandicum
- S. australiensis (J.L. Mulder (1989) = Zasmidium australiense
- S. bauhiniae (Haldar, J.B. Ray & A.K. Das (2003) = Zasmidium bauhiniae
- S. bischofiae-javanicae (R.K. Chaudhary, Tripathi, P.N. Singh & S. Chaudhary (2001) = Zasmidium bischofiae-javanicae
- S. bougainvilleae (J.M. Yen & Lim (1982) = Zasmidium bougainvilleae
- S. brideliicola (K. Srivast., A.K. Srivast. & Kamal (1994) = Zasmidium brideliicola
- S. browneicola R.K. Chaudhary, Tripathi, P.N. Singh & S. Chaudhary (2001) = Zasmidium browneicola
- S. buteae Seema Misra, N. Srivast. & A.K. Srivast. (1997) = Zasmidium buteae
- S. canavaliae (Syd. & P. Syd.) Deighton (1971) = Zasmidium canavaliae
- S. canthii J.M. Yen, A.K. Kar & B.K. Das (1982) = Zasmidium canthii
- S. capparacearum U. Braun & F.O. Freire (2006) = Zasmidium capparacearum
- S. capparicola (Hansf. & Thirum.) J.L. Mulder (1982) = Zasmidium capparicola
- S. capparicola S.K. Singh, Arch. Singh & Kamal (1997) = Zasmidium capparigenum
- S. capparigena U. Braun (2006) = Zasmidium capparigenum
- S. caryotae X.J. Liu & Y.Z. Liao (1980) = Zasmidium caryotae
- S. caseariicola S. Chaudhary & R.K. Chaudhary (2003) = Zasmidium caseariicola
- S. cassiae Abbasi & D.N. Shukla (1980) = Zasmidium cassiae
- S. cassiae Kamal, R.P. Singh & P. Kumar (1980) = Neocosmospora parva, Nectriaceae
- S. cassiae-fistulae U. Braun & Kamal (2003) = Zasmidium cassiae
- S. cassiae-torae S.K. Singh, Bhalla & Bhat (2001) = Zasmidium cassiae-torae
- S. cassiicola Seema Misra, A.K. Srivast. & Kamal (1999) = Zasmidium cassiicola
- S. cassiigena Arv. Kumar, Anuj Kumar & Kharwar (2006) = Zasmidium cassiae-occidentalis
- S. celastri A.N. Rai & Kamal (1990) = Zasmidium celastri
- S. cercestidis (J.M. Yen & Gilles) Deighton (1979) = Zasmidium cercestidis
- S. cercestidis (Deighton) U. Braun (2000) = Zasmidium deightonianum
- S. ceropegiae M.S. Patil & Sawant (1991) = Zasmidium ceropegiae
- S. cestri U. Braun, Crous & N. Pons (2003) = Zasmidium cestri
- S. cinnamomi Hosag. & U. Braun (1996) = Zasmidium cinnamomi
- S. citrigrisea (F.E. Fisher) Sivan. (1984) = Zasmidium citrigriseum
- S. colocasiae Sarbajna & Chattopadh. (1991) = Zasmidium colocasiae
- S. crotalariicola R. Chaudhary, C. Gupta & Kamal (1991) = Zasmidium crotalariicola
- S. cuneaegena Chaudary, Anuradha & M.S. Tripathi (2002) = Zasmidium cuneigenum
- S. cynanchi J.M. Yen, A.K. Kar & B.K. Das (1982) = Zasmidium cynanchi
- S. cyrtopodii Dorn.-Silva, Pereira-Carv. & Dianese (2008) = Zasmidium cyrtopodii
- S. deightoniana U. Braun (2005) = Zasmidium deightonianum
- S. dianellae (Sawada & Katsuki) Goh & W.H. Hsieh (1987) = Zasmidium dianellae
- S. dianthi H.D. Shin & U. Braun (1993) = Zasmidium dianthi
- S. dichanthii (S.A. Khan & Kamal) U. Braun & Crous (2003) = Zasmidium dichanthii
- S. dioscoreicola J.M. Yen, A.K. Kar & B.K. Das (1982) = Zasmidium dioscoreicola
- S. diospyri (Thüm.) U. Braun (1995) = Zasmidium diospyri
- S. diospyrigena Chaudary, Anuradha & M.S. Tripathi (2002) = Zasmidium diospyrigenum
- S. dracaenae (Hansf.) U. Braun & Crous (2003) = Zasmidium dracaenae
- S. ehretiigena S. Chaudhary & R.K. Chaudhary (2003) = Zasmidium ehretiigenum
- S. embeliae R.C. Rajak (1981) = Verrucisporota embeliae
- S. embeliae A.N. Rai & Kamal (1989) = Verrucisporota embeliae
- S. emblicae Firdousi, A.N. Rai, A.S. Mishra & K.M. Vyas (1993) = Zasmidium emblicae
- S. eriolobi (Thaung) K. Schub. & U. Braun (2007) = Zasmidium eriolobi
- S. erythroxyli-campestris Dorn.-Silva, Pereira-Carv. & Dianese (2008) = Zasmidium erythroxyli-campestris
- S. erythroxylicola Dorn.-Silva & Dianese (2008) = Zasmidium erythroxylicola
- S. erythroxyli-suberosi Dorn.-Silva, Pereira-Carv. & Dianese (2008) = Zasmidium erythroxyli-suberosi
- S. eucalypti Crous & Summerell (2007) = Pseudozasmidium eucalypti
- S. eugeniicola Seema Misra, A.K. Srivast. & Kamal (1999) = Zasmidium eugeniicola
- S. euphorbiicola S. Chaudhary & R.K. Chaudhary (2003) = Zasmidium euphorbiicola
- S. extremorum (Syd. & P. Syd.) U. Braun (2001) = Zasmidium extremorum
- S. fabacearum K. Srivast., A.K. Srivast. & Kamal (1994) = Zasmidium fabacearum
- S. ficina Kamal, P. Kumar & B. Rai (1981) = Zasmidium ficinum
- S. flacourtiae S.K. Singh, Bhalla & Bhat (2001) = Zasmidium flacourtiae
- S. gahniae McKenzie (1982) = Zasmidium gahniae
- S. garugae J.M. Yen, A.K. Kar & B.K. Das (1982) = Zasmidium garugae
- S. gongronematis (J.M. Yen & Gilles) Deighton (1979) = Zasmidium gongronematis
- S. gorakhpurensis (Kamal & P. Kumar) de Hoog (1983) = Zasmidium gorakhpurense
- S. guazumae U. Braun & Urtiaga (2008) = Zasmidium guazumae
- S. gynoxidicola (Petr.) J.L. Mulder (1982) = Cladosporium gynoxidicola, Cladosporiaceae
- S. gynurae (Sawada & Katsuki) Goh & W.H. Hsieh (1990) = Zasmidium gynurae
- S. haematitica U. Braun & Crous (2003) = Zasmidium haematiticum
- S. heterophragmatis Seema Misra, N. Srivast. & A.K. Srivast. (1997) = Zasmidium heterophragmatis
- S. himatanthi U. Braun & F.O. Freire (2004) = Zasmidium himatanthi
- S. hippocratiae K. Srivast., A.K. Srivast. & Kamal (1995) = Zasmidium hippocratiae
- S. hirtellae U. Braun & F.O. Freire (2006) = Zasmidium hirtellae
- S. holophaea (Syd.) U. Braun & Crous (2003) = Zasmidium holophaeum
- S. hymenocallidis U. Braun & Crous (2005) = Zasmidium hymenocallidis
- S. hyptiantherae S.K. Singh, Arch. Singh & Kamal (1997) = Zasmidium hyptiantherae
- S. ichnocarpicola S.K. Singh, Bhalla & Bhat (2001) = Zasmidium ichnocarpicola
- S. ipomoeae-stoloniferae (J.M. Yen & Gilles) U. Braun (2001) = Zasmidium ipomoeae-stoloniferae
- S. iteae R. Kirschner (2004) = Zasmidium iteae
- S. kansensis (Syd. & P. Syd.) U. Braun (1996) = Zasmidium kansense
- S. kydiae A.K. Singh & Kamal (1987) = Zasmidium kydiae
- S. lamiacearum S. Chaudhary, N. Sharma & Kamal (2002) = Zasmidium lamiacearum
- S. lantanae Seema Misra, N. Srivast. & A.K. Srivast. (1997) = Zasmidium lantanae
- S. leucothoes U. Braun (2007) = Zasmidium leucothoes
- S. liliacearum N. Sharma, Soni & R.K. Verma (2006) = Zasmidium smilacicola
- S. litseae-glutinosae (Syd. & P. Syd.) U. Braun (1995) = Zasmidium litseae-glutinosae
- S. lonicericola (Yong H. He & Z.Y. Zhang) K. Schub., H.D. Shin & U. Braun (2005) = Zasmidium lonicericola
- S. lygodii Sarbajna (1990) = Pseudocercospora lygodiigena
- S. lythri (Westend.) J.L. Mulder (1975) = Zasmidium lythri
- S. maesae Crous & U. Braun (1994) = Zasmidium maesae
- S. manihotis U. Braun & F.O. Freire (2004) = Zasmidium manihotis
- S. marasasii (Crous & M.J. Wingf.) B. Sutton & Crous (1997) = Zasmidium marasasii
- S. maughaniae (Suj. Singh) Kamal & Narayan (1987) = Pseudocercospora maughaniae
- S. meynae-laxiflorae K. Srivast., A.K. Srivast. & Kamal (1995) = Zasmidium meynae-laxiflorae
- S. micheliae S. Chaudhary & R.K. Chaudhary (2003) = Zasmidium micheliae
- S. millettiae R.K. Chaudhary, Tripathi, P.N. Singh & S. Chaudhary (2001) = Zasmidium millettiae
- S. mirzapurensis S.K. Singh, Bhalla & Bhat (2001) = Zasmidium mirzapurense
- S. mitellae (Peck) U. Braun (1993) = Zasmidium mitellae
- S. murrayae M.K. Khan, M.S. Khan bis & Kamal (1994) = Zasmidium murrayae
- S. musae Arzanlou & Crous (2008) = Zasmidium musae
- S. musicola Arzanlou & Crous (2008) = Zasmidium musicola
- S. myxa (Syd.) J.M. Yen, A.K. Kar & B.K. Das (1982) = Zasmidium myxum
- S. naucleae A.K. Das (1990) = Zasmidium naucleae
- S. ocoteae Dorn.-Silva & Dianese (2008) = Zasmidium ocoteae
- S. oliganthis (R.E.D. Baker & W.T. Dale) U. Braun & Crous (2003) = Zasmidium oliganthis
- S. oligoneuri (H.C. Greene) U. Braun & Crous (2003) = Zasmidium oligoneuri
- S. orchidacearum U. Braun & Sivap. (1999) = Zasmidium orchidacearum
- S. oroxylicola J.M. Yen, A.K. Kar & B.K. Das (1982) = Zasmidium oroxylicola
- S. oxycocci (Shear) K. Schub. & U. Braun (2007) = Zasmidium oxycocci
- S. parkii Crous & Alfenas (1995) = Pseudozasmidium parkii
- S. paulliniae (Deighton) K. Schub. & U. Braun (2005) = Zasmidium paulliniae
- S. pavoniae U. Braun & F.O. Freire (2004) = Zasmidium pavoniae
- S. pentatropidis K. Srivast., A.K. Srivast. & Kamal (1995) = Zasmidium pentatropidis
- S. periandrae U. Braun & F.O. Freire (2006) = Zasmidium periandrae
- S. persicae T. Yokoy. & Nasu (2000) = Zasmidium persicae
- S. pithecellobii J.L. Mulder (1975) = Passalora pithecellobii
- S. pittospori U. Braun (2007) = Zasmidium pittospori
- S. plectroniae Ponnappa (1968) = Zasmidium plectroniae
- S. plumeriae Sarbajna & Chattopadh. (1991) = Zasmidium plumeriae
- S. pluriseptata Gadp., C.D. Sharma, Firdousi, A.N. Rai & K.M. Vyas (1996) = Sirosporium pluriseptatum
- S. polyalthiae S. Chaudhary, N. Sharma & Kamal (2002) = Zasmidium polyalthiae
- S. praelonga (Syd.) U. Braun (1999) = Zasmidium praelongum
- S. prosopidis (Heald & F.A. Wolf) U. Braun & Crous (2007) = Zasmidium prosopidis
- S. pseudoparkii Crous & M.J. Wingf. (2006) = Zasmidium pseudoparkii
- S. pterocarpigena U. Braun & Hosag. (2003) = Zasmidium pterocarpigenum
- S. queenslandica Arzanlou & Crous (2008) = Zasmidium queenslandicum
- S. quitensis (Syd.) K. Schub. & U. Braun (2005) = Zasmidium quitense
- S. rhododendri R.K. Verma & Kamal (1987) = Zasmidium rhododendri
- S. rubiacearum S. Chaudhary, N. Sharma & Kamal (2002) = Zasmidium rubiacearum
- S. rutacearum Chaudary, Anuradha & M.S. Tripathi (2002) = Zasmidium rutacearum
- S. salicis (Chupp & H.C. Greene) Crous & U. Braun (2001) = Zasmidium salicis
- S. sardoa (Sacc. & Traverso) U. Braun (1993) = Zasmidium sardoum
- S. satpurensis N. Sharma, Soni & R.K. Verma (2006) = Zasmidium satpurense
- S. schefflerae (Boedijn) U. Braun (2001) = Zasmidium schefflerae
- S. schisandrae Pavgi & U.P. Singh (1971) = Zasmidium schisandrae
- S. schubertiana U. Braun & Urtiaga (2008) = Zasmidium schubertianum
- S. scleriae McKenzie (1982) = Zasmidium scleriae
- S. shoreae M.K. Khan & Kamal (1995) = Zasmidium shoreae
- S. shoreae (Thirum. & Chupp) Crous & U. Braun (2001) = Zasmidium shoreicola
- S. shoreicola U. Braun & Crous (2003) = Zasmidium shoreicola
- S. simaroubacearum U. Braun & F.O. Freire (2003) = Zasmidium simaroubacearum
- S. sinuosogeniculata U. Braun & C.F. Hill (2008) = Zasmidium sinuosogeniculatum
- S. smilacicola D.E. Shaw & Alcorn (1993) = Zasmidium smilacicola
- S. smilacis P. Kumar, D.N. Shukla & Kamal (1980) = Zasmidium smilacis
- S. smilacis-macrophyllae S. Chaudhary & R.K. Chaudhary (2003) = Zasmidium smilacis-macrophyllae
- S. solidaginis (Chupp & H.C. Greene) Crous & U. Braun (2001) = Zasmidium solidaginis
- S. sonapathariensis M.K. Khan, M.S. Khan bis & Kamal (1994) = Zasmidium sonapathariense
- S. sonneratiae Haldar, J.B. Ray & A.K. Das (2003) = Zasmidium sonneratiae
- S. stemodiicola U. Braun & F.O. Freire (2003) = Zasmidium stemodiicola
- S. stephaniae J.M. Yen, A.K. Kar & B.K. Das (1982) = Zasmidium stephaniae
- S. stipae (H.C. Greene) K. Schub. & U. Braun (2005) = Zasmidium stipae
- S. subsanguinea (Ellis & Everh.) U. Braun (1993) = Zasmidium subsanguineum
- S. telosmae K. Srivast., A.K. Srivast. & Kamal (1994) = Zasmidium telosmae
- S. tephrosiae (G.F. Atk.) U. Braun & Crous (2003) = Zasmidium tephrosiae
- S. tiliacorae Sarbajna (1990) = Zasmidium tiliacorae
- S. trijugae (B. Rai & Kamal) U. Braun (2000) = Zasmidium trijugae
- S. vangueriae (Thirum. & Mishra) Deighton (1979) = Zasmidium vangueriae
- S. vexans Crous (1999) = Zasmidium vexans
- S. weberi (Chupp) U. Braun & Bagyan. (1999) = Zasmidium weberi
- S. wendlandiicola U. Braun & Crous (2003) = Zasmidium wendlandiicola
- S. wikstroemiae (Petch) J. Walker (1991) = Zasmidium wikstroemiae
- S. xenoparkii Crous & M.J. Wingf. (2006) = Zasmidium xenoparkii
- S. xeromphigena J.M. Yen, A.K. Kar & B.K. Das (1982) = Zasmidium xeromphigenum
