= Hilum (biology) =

Structure on a seed or spore coat

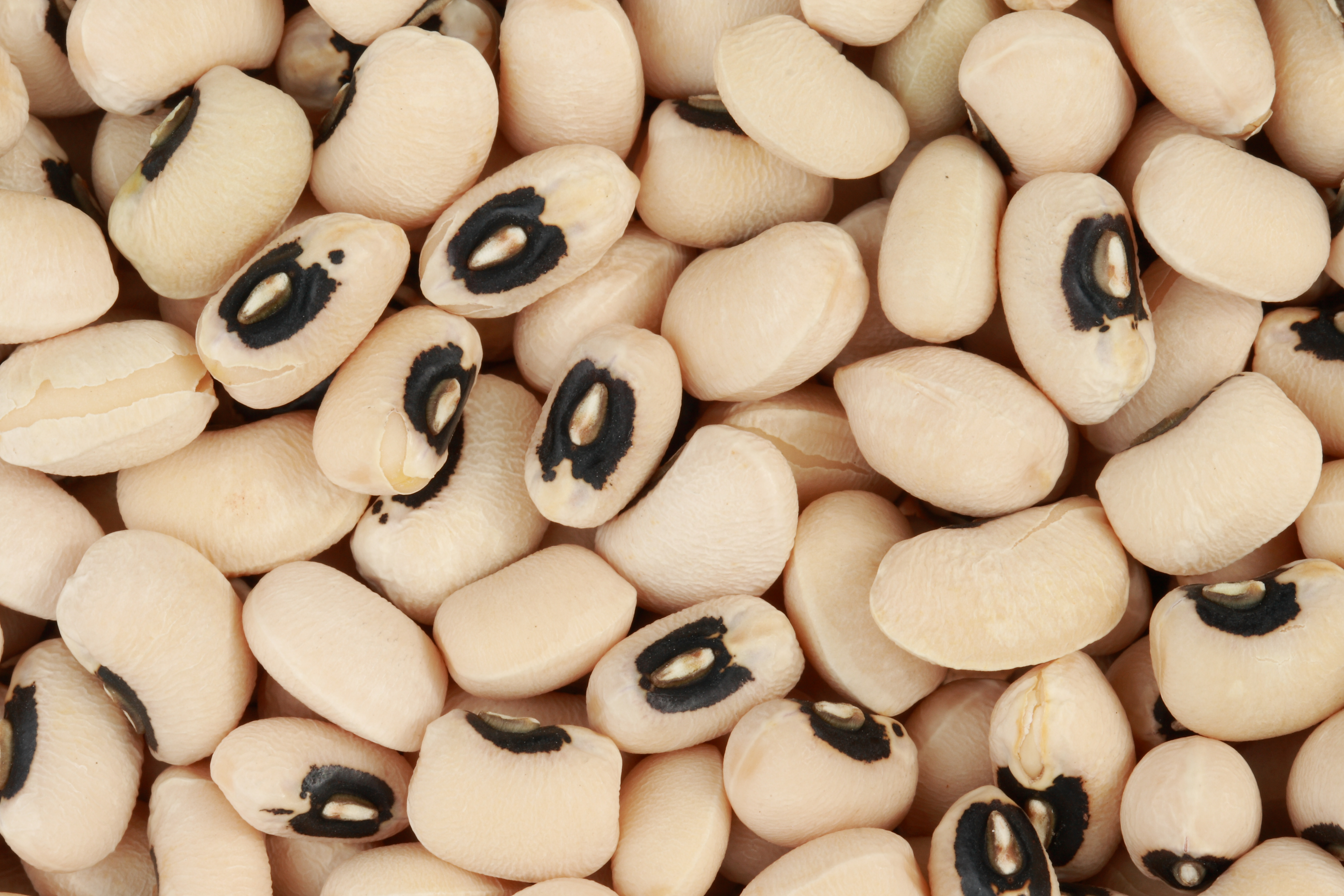
The hilum is the white region in the center of the namesake "black eye" of the black-eyed pea

In botany, a hilum (pronounced /ˈhaɪləm/) is a scar or mark left on a seed coat by the former attachment to the ovary wall or to the funiculus (which in turn attaches to the ovary wall). It is commonly known as the "eye" in some bean and pea species.

For some species of fungus, the hilum is the microscopic indentation left on a spore when it separates from the sterigma of the basidium.

A hilum can also refer to the point around which layers of starch are deposited in a starch granule. This point may be located either at the center or to the side of the granule.

The adjectival form hilar denotes the presence of such a mark, and for some species it can be used as a distinguishing characteristic.
