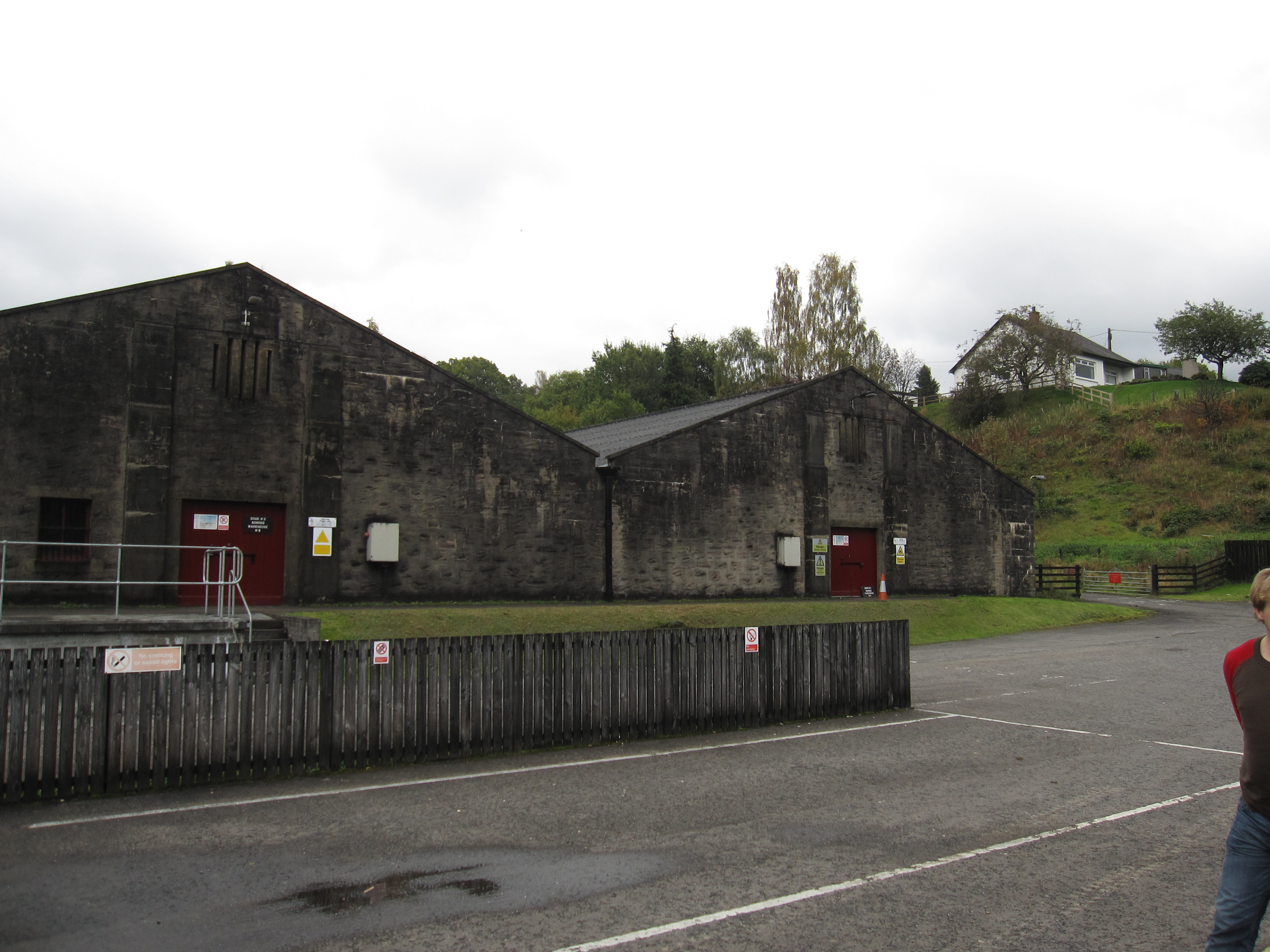
- Baudoinia compniacensis growing on Blair Athol distillery, feeding on the angel's share

Scientific classification
- Kingdom: Fungi
- Division: Ascomycota
- Class: Dothideomycetes
- Order: Mycosphaerellales
- Family: Teratosphaeriaceae; Crous & U.Braun

= Teratosphaeriaceae =

Family of fungi

Teratosphaeriaceae is a family of fungi in the order Mycosphaerellales.

== History ==
In 2007, this family was recognized as distinct from the genus Mycosphaerella, where it had previously been located, based on phylogenies constructed with the Large Subunit (LSU) of ribosomal DNA. In general, many fungi in the Mycosphaerellaceae and Teratosphaeriaceae are thought to be widespread, yet there is still little known about their individual distributions or the range of hosts that they inhabit. After the family was formally split out from Mycosphaerella in 2007, many new species have been described in this family including a number of causal agents in leaf diseases and stem cankers of Eucalyptus in Uruguay and Australia.

== Genera ==
As accepted by Wijayawardene et al. 2020 (with amount of species);

- Acidiella Hujslová & M. Kolařík (3)
- Acidomyces B.J. Baker, M.A. Lutz, S.C. Dawson, P.L. Bond & Banfield ex Selbmann, de Hoog & De Leo (2)
- Acrodontium de Hoog (17)
- Apenidiella Quaedvl. & Crous (1)
- Araucasphaeria Crous & M.J. Wingf. (1)
- Arboricolonus S. Bien & Damm (1)
- Aulographina Arx & E. Müll. (2)
- Austroafricana Quaedvl. & Crous (3)
- Austrostigmidium Pérez-Ort. & Garrido-Benavent (1)
- Batcheloromyces Marasas, P.S. van Wyk & Knox-Dav. (5)
- Baudoinia J.A. Scott & Unter. (5)
- Bryochiton Döbbeler & Poelt (5)
- Caatingomyces T.G.L. Oliveira, Souza-Motta, O.M.C. Magalh. & J.D.P. Bezerra (1)
- Camarosporula Petr. (1)
- Capnobotryella Sugiy. (6)
- Catenulostroma Crous & U. Braun (7)
- Constantinomyces Egidi & Onofri (4)
- Davisoniella H.J. Swart (1)
- Devriesia Seifert & N.L. Nick. (11)
- Elasticomyces Zucconi & Selbmann (1)
- Eupenidiella Quaedvl. & Crous (1)
- Euteratosphaeria Quaedvl. & Crous (1)
- Friedmanniomyces Onofri (2)
- Haniomyces J.C. Xu (1)
- Hispidoconidioma Tsuneda & Davey (2)
- Hortaea Nishim. & Miyaji (2)
- Hyweljonesia R.G. Shivas, Y.P. Tan, Marney & Abell (2)
- Incertomyces Egidi & Zucconi (2)
- Lapidomyces de Hoog & Stielow (1)
- Lawreya Ertz, Common, Diederich & U. Braun (1)
- Leptomelanconium Petr. (7)
- Meristemomyces Isola & Onofri (2)
- Microcyclospora J. Frank, Schroers & Crous (5)
- Monticola Selbmann & Egidi (1)
- Muriphila Jurjević, Čmoková & Hubka (1)
- Myrtapenidiella Quaedvl. & Crous (8)
- Neocatenulostroma Quaedvl. & Crous (3)
- Neophaeothecoidea Quaedvl. & Crous (1)
- Neotrimmatostroma Quaedvl. & Crous (3)
- Nothotrimmatostroma Crous (2)
- Oleoguttula Selbmann & de Hoog (1)
- Pachysacca Syd. (3)
- Palmeiromyces D.R.S. Pereira & A.J.L. Phillips (1)
- Parapenidiella Crous & Summerell (2)
- Parateratosphaeria Quaedvl. & Crous (6)
- Penidiella Crous & U. Braun (4)
- Penidiellomyces Crous, Attili-Angelis, A.P.M. Duarte, Pagnocca & J.Z. Groenew. (2)
- Penidiellopsis Sand.-Den., Gené, Deanna A. Sutton & Guarro (2)
- Phaeothecoidea Crous (5)
- Placocrea Syd. (1)
- Pseudotaeniolina J.L. Crane & Schokn. (2)
- Pseudoteratosphaeria Quaedvl. & Crous (6)
- Queenslandipenidiella Quaedvl. & Crous (1)
- Readeriella Syd. & P. Syd. (ca. 23)
- Recurvomyces Selbmann & de Hoog (1)
- Simplicidiella Crous, Attili-Angelis, A.P.M. Duarte, Pagnocca & J.Z. Groenew. (1)
- Stenella Syd. (ca. 45)
- Suberoteratosphaeria Quaedvl. & Crous (3)
- Teratoramularia Videira, H.D. Shin & Crous (4)
- Teratosphaeria Syd. & P. Syd. (58)
- Teratosphaericola Quaedvl. & Crous (1)
- Teratosphaeriopsis Quaedvl. & Crous (1)
- Xanthoriicola D. Hawksw. (1)

== Habitat ==
This family of fungi is notable in that it contains a number of extremeotolerant, so-called black yeast fungi. A number of these black yeast fungi in the Teratosphaeriaceae are considered 'rock-inhabiting', and manage to survive on the often-harsh exposed surfaces of rocks in a range of extreme climates, including in Antarctica. While some of the members of this family live in harsh environments, including the newly described genus Acidiella that grows in highly acidic soils (pH < 3) in Europe, other closely related species are found as lichens or on plant surfaces. This family, for example, contains a number of previously recognized leaf spot pathogens and endophytes. Sequences from the plant pathogen Teratosphaeria microspora were even found in a high-throughput screen of fungal spores in indoor dust.
